= List of buses =

Passenger transit vehicles

Year refers to the first year introduced. A range of years is the period the bus was manufactured.

== 0–9 ==
List of buses: 0–9
Bus	Image	Type	Manufacturer	Year	Notes	Country
021		Single deck	Jelcz	1967 to 1979	Articulated	Poland
043		Single deck	Jelcz	1959 to 1986		Poland
080		Single deck	Jelcz	1978 to 1984		Poland
1 CB		Single deck	Berliet	1911		France
2.0		Single deck	Ebusco	2014	Electric	Netherlands
2.1		Single deck	Ebusco	2017	Electric	Netherlands
2.2		Single deck	Ebusco	2018	Electric	Netherlands
2X		Minibus	Power Vehicle Innovation	2011	Electric	France
3		Single deck	KAG	1956 to 1990		Lithuanian SSR
3.0		Single deck	Ebusco	2019	Electric	Netherlands
3-series		Single deck	Scania	1988 to 1999		Sweden
3DUK-50		Single deck	Saurer	1968 to 1973		Switzerland
3Ro		Single deck	Lancia	1938 to 1949		Italy
3Tr		Single deck	Škoda	1941 to 1948	Trolleybus	Czech Republic
4 GTP		Single deck	Berna		Trolleybus	Switzerland
4 UPO		Single deck	Berna	1946		Switzerland
4-series		Single deck	Scania	1997 to 2006		Sweden
4.80		Single deck	APE	1961 to 1976	Trailer bus	Switzerland
4H		Single deck	Saurer	1941		Switzerland
4X		Single deck	Power Vehicle Innovation		Electric	France
5 DUK		Single deck	Saurer	1953 to 1975		Switzerland
5C		Single deck	Chavdar			Bulgaria
6Tr		Single deck	Škoda	1949	Trolleybus	Czech Republic
7Tr		Single deck	Škoda	1950 to 1955	Trolleybus	Czech Republic
8Tr		Single deck	Škoda	1956 to 1961	Trolleybus	Czech Republic
9Tr		Single deck	Škoda	1958 to 1981	Trolleybus	Czech Republic
10LF		Single deck	Autosan	2012		Poland
11G5		Single deck	Chavdar	1975	On license Kasbohrer	Bulgaria
11M3		Single deck	Chavdar	1970		Bulgaria
11M4		Single deck	Chavdar	1977		Bulgaria
12M		Single deck	Ashok Leyland			India
14Tr		Single deck	Škoda Transportation	1981 to 2003	Trolleybus	Czech Republic
14TrM		Single deck	Škoda	1995 to 2004	Trolleybus	Czech Republic
15Tr		Single deck	Škoda	1988 to 2004	Articulated trolleybus	Czech Republic
15TrM		Single deck	Škoda	1995 to 2004	Articulated trolleybus	Czech Republic
15TrSF		Single deck	Škoda	2002 to 2003	Articulated trolleybus operated by MUNI	Czech Republic
17Tr		Single deck	Škoda	1987 to 1990	Trolleybus	Czech Republic
18		Single deck	Fiat	1911 to 1921		Italy
18.2x0		Single deck	MAN Truck & Bus	1998 to 2017		Germany
21Tr		Single deck	Škoda	1995 to 2004	Trolleybus	Czech Republic
22Tr		Single deck	Škoda	2002 to 2004	Articulated trolleybus	Czech Republic
24.310 / 24.350		Double deck	MAN Truck & Bus	1998		Germany
24 CV		Single deck	De Dion-Bouton	1905		France
24Tr Irisbus		Single deck	Škoda; Irisbus	2003 to 2014	Trolleybus	Czech Republic
25Tr		Single deck	Škoda	2005 to 2014	Articulated trolleybus	Czech Republic
26Tr		Single deck	Škoda	2009	Trolleybus	Czech Republic
27Tr Solaris		Single deck	Škoda; Solaris	2009 to present	Articulated trolleybus	Czech Republic
28Tr		Single deck	Škoda	2008 to 2015	Trolleybus	Czech Republic
30		Single deck	Ikarus	1951 to 1957		Hungary
30-LFN		Single deck	NABI	2005		USA
30Tr SOR		Single deck	Škoda; SOR Libchavy	2011 to present	Trolleybus	Czech Republic
31		Single deck	Ikarus	1956 to 1965		Hungary
31-LFW CNG		Single deck	NABI	2018		USA
31Tr SOR		Single deck	Škoda; SOR Libchavy	2010 to present	Articulated trolleybus	Czech Republic
32Tr SOR		Single deck	Škoda; SOR Libchavy		Trolleybus	Czech Republic
33Tr SOR		Single deck	Škoda; SOR Libchavy		Articulated trolleybus	Czech Republic
34		Single deck	SPA	1927		Italy
35-LFW		Single deck	NABI	1998 to 2013		USA
35Tr		Single deck	Škoda	2020	Articulated trolleybus	Czech Republic
38-S-DT		Single deck	Twin Coach	1948		USA
40A		Single deck	Alfa Romeo	1932 to 1934		Italy
40GWFT		Single deck	Twin Coach	1940	Trolleybus	USA
40VH		Single deck	Franz Brozincevic Wetzikon	1970s		Switzerland
40-LFW (Gen I)		Single deck	NABI	2008		USA
40-LFW (Gen II)		Single deck	NABI	2008		USA
40-LFW (Gen III)		Single deck	NABI	2020		USA
40-R		Single deck	Twin Coach	1937		USA
42-BRT		Single deck	NABI	2006 to 2015		USA
44TTW		Single deck	Twin Coach	1949	Trolleybus	USA
50U		Single deck	Franz Brozincevic Wetzikon	1970s		Switzerland
54		Double deck	Waggonbau Bautzen	1954 to 1957		Germany
55		Single deck	Ikarus	1955 to 1973		Hungary
56		Double deck	Waggonbau Bautzen	1957 to 1959		Germany
60		Single deck	Ikarus	1952 to 1959		Hungary
60T		Single deck	Ikarus	1952 to 1976	Trolleybus	Hungary
60-BRT		Single deck	NABI	2015	Articulated	USA
60-LFW		Single deck	NABI	2005		USA
66		Single deck	Ikarus	1955 to 1973		Hungary
80A		Single deck	Alfa Romeo	late 1920s		Italy
85A		Single deck	Alfa Romeo	1933 to 1940		Italy
85AF		Single deck	Alfa Romeo	1936 to 1940	Trolleybus	Italy
91U EU4A		Single deck	Franz Brozincevic Wetzikon			Switzerland
100		Single deck	BKM	1993 to 1994	Trolleybus	Belarus
100 L6		Single deck	SNVI			Algeria
100 V8		Single deck	SNVI			Algeria
101		Single deck	MAZ	1993 to 1998		Belarus
101		Single deck	BKM	1994 to 2003	Trolleybus	Belarus
102-A2		Single deck	Motor Coach Industries	1986 to 1991		Canada
102-B3		Single deck	Motor Coach Industries	1991 to 1994		Canada
102-C3		Single deck	Motor Coach Industries	1988 to 1993		Canada
102-DL3		Single deck	Motor Coach Industries	1992 to 2005		Canada
102-EL3		Single deck	Motor Coach Industries	1998 to 2013		Canada
103		Single deck	MAZ	1996 to 2020		Belarus
103T		Single deck	MAZ	1999	Trolleybus	Belarus
104		Single deck	MAZ	1994 to 2007		Belarus
105		Single deck	MAZ	1997 to 2013	Articulated	Belarus
107		Single deck	MAZ	2001 to present		Belarus
110A		Single deck	Alfa Romeo	1934 to 1950		Italy
110AF		Single deck	Alfa Romeo	1939 to 1944	Trolleybus	Italy
112 UD		Single deck	Rocar	1974 to 1980		Romania
120		Single deck	Chavdar	1985		Bulgaria
120M		Single deck	Jelcz	1992 to 2007		Poland
120M/3		Single deck	Jelcz	1999 to 2004		Poland
120MM/2		Single deck	Jelcz	1998 to 2004		Poland
120MT		Single deck	Jelcz	1997 to 2005	Trolleybus	Poland
120MTr		Single deck	Jelcz	1993 to 1998	Trolleybus	Poland
120MTE		Single deck	Jelcz	1996 to 1997	Trolleybus	Poland
140		Double deck	Lancia	1967 to 1968		Italy
140A		Single deck	Alfa Romeo	1950 to 1958		Italy
140AF		Single deck	Alfa Romeo	1949 to 1960	Trollleybus	Italy
141		Single deck	Chavdar	1986		Bulgaria
150A		Single deck	Alfa Romeo	1957 to 1958		Italy
152		Single deck	MAZ	2000 to 2014		Belarus
158		Single deck	LiAZ	1961		Russia
171		Single deck	MAZ	2005 to present	Airside transfer	Belarus
180		Single deck	Ikarus	1966 to 1973	Articulated	Hungary
201		Single deck	BKM	1996 to 2011	Trolleybus	Belarus
203		Single deck	MAZ	2006 to present		Belarus
203T		Single deck	MAZ	2008	Trolleybus	Belarus
205		Single deck	MAZ	2009 to present	Articulated	Belarus
206		Single deck	MAZ	2009 to present		Belarus
211		Single deck	Ikarus	1976 to 1990		Hungary
213		Single deck	BKM	2002 to 2006	Trolleybus	Belarus
215		Single deck	MAZ	2013 to present	Articulated	Belarus
216		Single deck	MAZ	2018 to present	Articulated	Belarus
221		Single deck	BKM	2003 to present	Trolleybus	Belarus
231		Single deck	MAZ	2013		Belarus
241		Single deck	MAZ	2013 to 2018	Midibus	Belarus
246		Single deck	Ikarus	1996		Hungary
250		Single deck	Ikarus	1970 to 1996		Hungary
251		Single deck	MAZ	2006 to 2021		Belarus
255		Single deck	Ikarus	1970 to 1990		Hungary
256		Single deck	Ikarus	1977 to 1989		Hungary
256		Single deck	MAZ	2005 to 2014	Minibus	Belarus
257		Single deck	MAZ	2019	Midibus	Belarus
260		Single deck	Ikarus	1971 to 2002		Hungary
260T		Single deck	Ikarus	1974	Trolleybus	Hungary
263		Single deck	Ikarus	1988 to 2001		Hungary
266		Single deck	Ikarus	1972 to 1990		Hungary
272 MEX		Single deck	Jelcz	1963 to 1977		Germany
280		Single deck	Ikarus	1973 to 2002	Articulated	Hungary
281		Single deck	Ikarus	1978 to 1993	also articulated	Hungary
282		Single deck	Ikarus	1976 to 1978	Articulated	Hungary
283		Single deck	Ikarus	1988 to 1997	Articulated	Hungary
284		Single deck	Ikarus	1981 to 1991	Articulated	Hungary
286		Single deck	Crown-Ikarus	1980 to 1986	Articulated	Hungary; USA
300 / 320 / 340		Single deck	Duple Coachbuilders	1985 to 1989	Bodywork	United Kingdom
303		Single deck	Ikarus	1959 to 1963		Hungary
303		Single deck	MAZ	2019 to 2021		Belarus
306		Single deck	Fiat	1956 to 1982	306/1 (1956 to 1960); 306/2 (1960 to 1962); 306/3 (1962 to 1982)	Italy
308		Single deck	Fiat	1971 to 1978		Italy
309		Single deck	Fiat	1958 to 1970		Italy
314		Single deck	Fiat	1960 to 1978		Italy
315		Single deck	Custom Bus		Bodywork	Australia
315		Single deck	Fiat	1978 to 2001		Italy
316		Single deck	Iveco Bus	1978 to 2000		Italy
321		Single deck	BKM	2000 to present	Trolleybus	Belarus
333		Single deck	BKM	1998 to 2016	Articulated trolleybus	Belarus
343		Single deck	Fiat (1972 to 1978)	1966 to 1978	Chassis-only sold from 1966 to 1978	Italy
350		Single deck	Ikarus	1980s		Hungary
370		Single deck	Fiat (1976-1980); Iveco (1980-1999)	1976 to 1999	Chassis-only sold from 1978 to 1999.	Italy
400		Single deck	Tatra	1948 to 1955	Trolleybus	Czech Republic
401		Single deck	Fiat	1953 to 1958		Italy
403 RHD		Single deck	Fabrika automobila Priboj			Serbia
405		Single deck	Ikarus	1995		Hungary
405G		Single deck	Neobus			Serbia
409		Single deck	Fiat	1962 to 1979		Italy
410		Single deck	Fiat	1960 to 1973		Italy
411		Single deck	Fiat	1956 to 1964		Italy
411LM		Single deck	Saurer	1957	Trolleybus	Switzerland
411T		Single deck	Ikarus	1994	Trolleybus	Hungary
412		Double deck	Fiat	1961 to 1970		Italy
412		Single deck	Ikarus	1996 to 2002		Hungary
412T		Single deck	Ikarus	1999 to 2002	Trolleybus	Hungary
413		Double deck	Fiat	1961 to 1961	Viberti Monotral CV61	Italy
414		Single deck	Fiat	1960 to 1973		Italy
415		Single deck	Ikarus	1987 to 2002		Hungary
415		Single deck	Saurer		Trolleybus	Switzerland
415T		Single deck	Ikarus	1997 to 2002	Trolleybus	Hungary
416		Single deck	Fiat	1964 to 1973		Italy
416-SFW		Single deck	NABI	1989 to 2013		USA
417		Single deck	Ikarus	1995 to 2002		Hungary
418		Single deck	Fiat	1972 to 1982		Italy
420		Single deck	BKM	2008 to present	Trolleybus	Belarus
421		Single deck	Fiat	1973 to 1983		Italy
425		Single deck	Duple Coachbuilders	1984 to 1989	Running units supplied by Dennis	United Kingdom
430A		Single deck	Alfa Romeo	1949 to 1953		Italy
435		Single deck	Ikarus	1985 to 2002	Articulated	Hungary
435T		Single deck	Ikarus	1994 to 1996	Trolleybus	Hungary
436-SFW		Single deck	NABI	1991 to 2002		USA
438		Single deck	Ikarus	1996	Articulated	Hungary
470		Single deck	Fiat	1979 to 1986		Italy
480		Single deck	Ikarus	1990 to 1997		Hungary
481		Single deck	Ikarus	1998 to 1999		Hungary
500 HB		Single deck	Tatra	1950 to 1957		Czech Republic
500A		Single deck	Alfa Romeo	1945 to 1948		Italy
510		Single deck	Custom Bus		Bodywork	Australia
521		Single deck	Ikarus	1987 to 1990		Hungary
550		Single deck	Custom Bus		Bodywork	Australia
556		Single deck	Ikarus	1965 to 1973		Hungary
600		Single deck	MCV	1996 to present	Chassis: Mercedes-Benz OC 500 RF 2542	Egypt
618R		Single deck	Fiat	1934 to 1937		Italy
625		Single deck	Fiat/Van Hool-Fiat	1965 to 1972		Italy/Belgium
630		Single deck	Ikarus	1959 to 1971		Hungary
635F		Single deck	Fiat	1937 to 1941	Trolleybus	Italy
642RN		Single deck	Fiat	1949 to 1953		Italy
651		Single deck	GAZ	1951 to 1973		Russia
652		Single deck	PAZ	1958 to 1968	Minibus	Soviet Union
656RN		Single deck	Fiat	1932 to 1945		Italy
666RN		Single deck	Fiat	1948 to 1953		Italy
668F		Single deck	Fiat	1950 to 1960	Trolleybus	Italy
672		Single deck	PAZ	1967 to 1993		USSR
672F		Single deck	Fiat	1940 to 1954	Trolleybus	Italy
672RN		Single deck	Fiat	1948 to 1952		Italy
677		Single deck	LiAZ	1968 to 2000		Russia
680RN		Single deck	Fiat	1949 to 1954		Italy
682RN		Single deck	Fiat	1953 to 1957		Italy
685		Single deck	KAvZ	1971 to 1993	Minibus	Russia
695		Single deck	Lviv Bus Factory	1956 to 2008		Ukraine
695		Double deck	Ikarus	1982	Articulated	Hungary
697		Single deck	LAZ	1959 to 1985		Ukraine
699		Single deck	LAZ	1961 to 2002		Ukraine
700 / 800 / 900 series		Single deck	New Flyer; AM General (licensed production in USA)	1967 to 1987		Canada; USA
703		Single deck	Lancia	1957 to 1964	Articulated	Italy
706 RTO		Single deck	Škoda; Karosa	1958 to 1972		Czech Republic
706 RTO-K		Single deck	Škoda; Karosa	1960	Articulated	Czech Republic
718		Single deck	Yellow Coach	1934 to 1936		USA
718		Single deck	Lancia	1973 to 1974		Italy
719		Single deck	Yellow Coach	1934 to 1936		USA
731		Single deck	Yellow Coach	1935 to 1936		USA
750 HO-SL		Single deck	MAN	1969 to 1975		Germany
761T		Double deck	Associated Equipment Company	1933 to 1934		United Kingdom
800		Double deck	MCV	2016 to present	Chassis: Mercedes-Benz OC 500 RF 2542	Egypt
800AF		Single deck	Alfa Romeo	1940 to 1954	Trolleybus	Italy
870		Single deck	Flxible	1976		USA
890 UG		Single deck	MAN	1969 to 1975	Articulated	Germany
900A		Single deck	Alfa Romeo	1952 to 1956		Italy
900AF		Single deck	Alfa Romeo	1955 to 1957	Trollleybus	Italy
902A		Single deck	Alfa Romeo	1957 to 1959		Italy
911AF		Single deck	Alfa Romeo	1959 to 1960	Trollleybus	Italy
977		Single deck	RAF	1958 to 1976	Minibus	Soviet Union
1200B		Single deck	Danish Automobile Building	1980s to 1990s		Denmark
1510; 1512		Chassis	Tata Motors			India
1800B		Single deck	Danish Automobile Building	1980s to 1990s	Articulated	Denmark
2203		Minibus	RAF	1976 to 1997		Latvia
2215		Single deck	BAZ	2003 to 2010		Ukraine
2400		Single deck	Cobus Industries		Airport bus	Germany
2401		Single deck	Fiat	1953 to 1958	Trolleybus	Italy
2405		Single deck	Fiat	1955 to 1960	Trolleybus	Italy
2411		Single deck	Fiat	1955 to 1969	Trolleybus	Italy
2411/1 Cansa		Single deck	Cansa	1961 to 1966	Trolleybus	Italy
2470		Single deck	Iveco	1979 to 1986	Trolleybus	Italy
2472 Viberti		Single deck	Fiat	1958 to 1965	Articulated trolleybus	Italy
2700		Single deck	Cobus Industries		Airport bus	Germany
3000		Rear-engine chassis	Navistar International	1996 to 2024	Used primarily for school buses	USA
3000		Single deck	Cobus Industries		Airport bus	Germany
3203		Single deck	PAZ	2006 to present	Minibus	Russia
3204		Single deck	PAZ	2006 to 2018	Minibus	Russia
3205		Single deck	PAZ	1989 to present	Minibus	Ukraine
3206		Single deck	PAZ	1995	Minibus	Russia
3237		Single deck	PAZ	2002 to present	Midibus	Russia
3244		Single deck	KAvZ	1966 to 2006	Minibus	Russia
3300		Chassis	Navistar International	2005 to 2024	Used primarily for school buses	USA
3800		Chassis	Navistar International	1989 to 2004	Used primarily for school buses	USA
3900		Forward control chassis	Navistar International	1990 to 2010	Used primarily for school buses.	USA
3976		Single deck	KAvZ	1992 to 2008	Minibus	Russia
4202		Single deck	LAZ	1978 to 1985		Ukraine
4230		Single deck	PAZ	2001 to 2002	Midibus	Russia
4234		Single deck	PAZ	2002	Midibus	Russia
4292		Single deck	LiAZ	2015		Russia
5250		Single deck	LiAZ	2011 to 2014		Russia
5251		Single deck	LiAZ	2014		Russia
5256		Single deck	LiAZ	1986 to 2021		Soviet Union / Russia
5280		Single deck	LiAZ	2005 to 2012	Trolleybus	Russia
5292		Single deck	LiAZ	2004		Russia
5293		Single deck	LiAZ	2006		Russia
5299		Single deck	NefAZ	2000		Russia
5917		Single deck	LiAZ	1989 to 1992		Soviet Union / Russia
6212		Single deck	LiAZ	2002	Articulated	Russia
6213		Single deck	LiAZ	2008-2014, 2016 to present	Articulated bus	Russia
6224		Single deck	LiAZ	2004 to 2005		Russia
6228		Single deck	LiAZ	2006 to 2016		Russia
6274		Single deck	LiAZ	2018	Electric bus	Russia
7500		Single deck	Volvo Buses	2005 to 2011	Bi-articulated	Sweden
7700		Single deck	Volvo Buses	1999 to 2012		Sweden; Finland; Poland
7900		Single deck	Volvo Buses	2011 to present		Sweden; Poland
8500		Single deck	Volvo Buses	2001 to 2011		Sweden; Denmark
8700		Single deck	Volvo Buses	2002 to 2011		Sweden; Finland; Poland
8900		Single deck	Volvo Buses	2010 to present		Sweden; Poland
9400		Single deck	Volvo Buses	2001 to present		India
9600		Single deck	Volvo Buses	2022 to present		India
9700		Single deck	Volvo Buses	2001 to present		Sweden; Finland; Poland; Mexico
9900		Single deck	Volvo Buses	2001 to 2005; 2007 to present		
10240T		Single deck	AM General	1970s	Trolleybus	USA
42021		Single deck	LAZ	1985 to 1993		Ukraine
43303A		Single deck	BKM	2012 to 2013	Articulated trolleybus	Belarus
52765		Single deck	NefAZ	2009 to 2010	Trolleybus	Russia
52802		Single deck	LiAZ	2005 to 2007	Trolleybus	Russia

== A ==
List of buses: A
Bus	Image	Type	Manufacturer	Year	Notes	Country
A22		Single deck	MAN Truck & Bus	2010 to present		Germany
A 30		Single deck	Karosa	1968 to 1972		Czech Republic
A95		Double deck	MAN Truck & Bus	2014 to 2025		Germany
A07A1 I-VAN		Minibus	ZAZ	2005 to 2021		Ukraine
A10C		Single Deck	ZAZ	2008 to present		Ukraine
A069		Single deck	Bogdan	2006 to present		Ukraine
A079		Single deck	BAZ			Ukraine
A081		Single deck	BAZ			Ukraine
A091		Single deck	Bogdan	1999 to 2005		Ukraine
A092		Single deck	Bogdan	2003 to 2012	Midibus	Ukraine
A0808MN		Single deck	Autosan	2008	Midibus	Poland
A0808T Gemini		Single deck	Autosan	2004		Poland
A0909L Tramp		Single deck	Autosan	2000		Poland
A0909S Smyk		Single deck	Autosan	2000		Poland
A92 DAR-L/Jonckheere		Single deck	Brossel Jonckheere	1962 to 1967		Belgium
A92 DLHS		Single deck	Brossel	1952 to 1955		Belgium
A144		Single deck	Bogdan	2002 to present		Ukraine
A148		Single deck	BAZ	2007		Ukraine
A401		Single deck	Bogdan	2008 to present		Ukraine
A404T Cezar		Single deck	Autosan	1997 to 2002		Poland
A601		Single deck	Bogdan	2009 to present		Ukraine
A844MN		Single deck	Autosan	2001		Poland
A1010M Medium		Single deck	Autosan	1995 to 2005		Poland
A1010T		Single deck	Autosan	2000		Poland
A1012T		Single deck	Autosan	1996 to 2000		Poland
A1112T		Single deck	Autosan	1999 to 2007		Poland
A11110		Single deck	BAZ			Ukraine
A-537		Single deck	Fabrika automobila Priboj	1995 to present		Serbia
A-547.3		Single deck	Fabrika automobila Priboj			Serbia
A-559.4		Single deck	Fabrika automobila Priboj		Articulated	Serbia
Aberdonian		Single deck	Albion Motors	1957 to 1960		United Kingdom
AD		Single deck	Saurer	1930		Switzerland
ADi		Single deck	BusTech		Integral high floor coach	Australia
Aero		Single deck	Hyundai Motor Company	1985 to 2010	Variants: Aero Express, Aero Queen, Aero Space	South Korea
Aero Bus		Single deck	Mitsubishi Fuso Truck & Bus Corporation	1982 to present	Variants: Aero Ace, Aero Queen	Japan
Aero City		Single deck	Hyundai Motor Company	1991 to present		South Korea
Aero King		Double deck	Mitsubishi Fuso Truck & Bus Corporation	1984 to 2005; 2008 to 2010		Japan
Aero Midi		Single deck	Mitsubishi Fuso Truck & Bus Corporation	1988 to 2017		Japan
Aero Star		Single deck	Mitsubishi Fuso Truck & Bus Corporation	1984 to present		Japan
Aero Town		Single deck	Hyundai Motor Company	1985 to present		South Korea
Afriway		Single deck	Iveco Bus	2015 to present		South Africa
AGG300		Single deck	Van Hool	1993	Bi-articulated	Belgium
Agora L		Single deck	Renault (1995 to 2002); Irisbus (1999 to 2005)	1995 to 2005	Articulated; Also built in the Czech Republic under the Citybus by Karosa, and as a trolleybus by Skoda, and in Romania by Astra Bus.	France; Czech Republic; Romania
Agora S		Single deck	Renault (1995 to 2002); Irisbus (1999 to 2006)	1995 to 2006	Also built in the Czech Republic under the Citybus by Karosa, and as a trolleybus by Skoda, and in Romania by Astra Bus.	France; Czech Republic; Romania
AI450		Single deck	LAG Motorcoach	1983 to 1988		Belgium
Ailsa B55		Double deck	Volvo Buses	1973 to 1985		United Kingdom
AKSM-321		Single deck	Belkommunmash	2001 to present	Trolleybus	Belarus
AKSM-333		Single deck	Belkommunmash	1998, 2002 to 2016	Articulated trolleybus	Belarus
Alé		Single deck	Rampini	2006 to present		Italy
Alero		Minibus	Optare	2001 to 2008		United Kingdom
All American		School bus	Blue Bird Body Company (1948-1992); Blue Bird Corporation (1992–present)	1948 to present	Used primarily for school buses	USA
Allergo SI 29		Single deck	Samco		Midibus	Vietnam
Alpencar		Single deck	Berna	1948		Switzerland
Alpha		Single deck	Salvador Caetano	1976 to 1983		Portugal
Alpino		Single deck	Solaris Bus & Coach	2007 to 2018		Poland
ALX100		Minibus	Walter Alexander Coachbuilders	1997 to 1999	Bodywork	United Kingdom
ALX200		Single deck	Walter Alexander Coachbuilders; TransBus	1996 to 2001	Bodywork	United Kingdom
ALX300		Single deck	Walter Alexander Coachbuilders; TransBus; Alexander Dennis	1997 to 2007	Bodywork	United Kingdom
ALX400		Double deck	Walter Alexander Coachbuilders; TransBus; Alexander Dennis	1997 to 2006	Bodywork	United Kingdom
ALX500		Double deck	Walter Alexander Coachbuilders	1997 to 2002	Bodywork	United Kingdom
Ambassador		Single deck	VDL Berkhof	2001 to 2011		Netherlands
Amfibus		Single deck	Dutch Amphibious Transport Vehicles BV	2009	Amphibious	Netherlands
AN440		Single deck	Neoplan USA	1981		USA
AN440A		Single deck	Neoplan USA	1980s		USA
AN440LF		Single deck	Neoplan USA			USA
AN440LF-ETB		Single deck	Neoplan USA		Trolleybus	USA
AN459		Single deck	Neoplan USA		Articulated	USA
AN460LF		Single deck	Neoplan USA		Articulated	USA
AP		Single deck	Société des usines Chausson	1948 to ?		France
Apollo		Single deck	Merkavim			Israel
Apollo		Single deck	Automet	2005		Poland
Aptis		Single deck	Alstom	2017		France
APU		Single deck	Société des usines Chausson	1942 to 1964		France
Arab I		Double deck	Guy Motors	1942		United Kingdom
Arab II		Double deck	Guy Motors	1943 to 1948		United Kingdom
Arab III		Single deck	Guy Motors			United Kingdom
Arab IV		Double deck	Guy Motors	1950 to 1960		United Kingdom
Arab IV		Single deck	Guy Motors	1950 to 1960		United Kingdom
Arab V		Double deck	Guy Motors	1960 to 1969		United Kingdom
Arab V		Single deck	Guy Motors	1960 to 1969		United Kingdom
Arab UF		Single deck	Guy Motors	1950 to 1960		United Kingdom
Ares		Single deck	Renault Trucks; Irisbus			France; Czech Republic
Arrow		Double deck	Dennis	1995 to 1998		United Kingdom
Articulated Bus		Single deck	Leyland Motors-DAB	1979 to 1985	Articulated	United Kingdom; Denmark
Arway		Single deck	Irisbus/Iveco Bus	2006 to 2013		France; Czech Republic
Astra Citelis		Single deck	Astra Bus		Trolleybus	Romania
Atak		Single deck	Karsan	2014 to present		Turkey
Atakor		Single deck	SNVI	2016		Algeria
Atlantean		Double deck	Leyland Motors	1958 to 1986		United Kingdom
Autoalveare		Two decks	Lancia Veicoli Speciali	1930 to 1932		Italy
AutoTram Extra Grand		Single deck	Göppel; Fraunhofer IVI; MAN	2012	Bi-articulated	Germany
Atwater Street Monster		Single deck	Versare Company	1920s		USA
Avancity		Single deck	BredaMenarinibus	2005 to 2013	Diesel - CNG	Italy
Avancity+		Single deck	BredaMenarinibus	2008 to 2013		Italy
Avancity+ HTB		Single deck	BredaMenarinibus	2004	Articulated trolleybus	Italy
Avenue LF		Single deck	TEMSA	2008		Turkey
Axcess-Floline		Single deck	Wrightbus	1998 to 2001	Bodywork	United Kingdom
Axcess-Ultralow		Single deck	Wrightbus	1995 to 1998	Bodywork	United Kingdom
Axer		Single deck	Iveco Bus	2002 to 2007		Czech Republic
Axess		Single deck	ENC	2003 to present		United States
Axial		Single deck	VDL Berkhof			Netherlands

== B ==
List of buses: B
Name	Image	Type	Manufacturer	Year	Notes	Country
B 7,5		Single deck	SOR Libchavy			Czech Republic
B 9,5		Single deck	SOR Libchavy			Czech Republic
B 10,5		Single deck	SOR Libchavy			Czech Republic
B 731		Single deck	Karosa	1981 to 1996		Czech Republic
B 732		Single deck	Karosa	1983 to 1996		Czech Republic
B 741		Single deck	Karosa	1991 to 1997	Articulated	Czech Republic
B 831		Single deck	Karosa	1987 to 1989		Czech Republic
B 832		Single deck	Karosa	1997 to 1999		Czech Republic
B 841		Single deck	Karosa		Articulated	Czech Republic
B 931		Single deck	Karosa	1996 to 2002		Czech Republic
B 932		Single deck	Karosa	1996 to 2002		Czech Republic
B 941		Single deck	Karosa	1997 to 2002	Articulated	Czech Republic
B 951		Single deck	Karosa	2002 to 2006		Czech Republic
B 952		Single deck	Karosa	2002 to 2006		Czech Republic
B 961		Single deck	Karosa		Articulated	Czech Republic
B-Series		School bus	General Motors Truck & Coach	1966 to 2003		USA
B-type		Double deck	London General Omnibus Company; Associated Equipment Company	1910		United Kingdom
B5LH		Single/double deck	Volvo Buses	2008 to present	Hybrid-electric	Sweden
B5RLEH		Single deck	Volvo Buses	2013 to present	Hybrid-electric	Sweden
B5TL		Double deck	Volvo Buses	2013 to present		Sweden
B6		Single deck	Volvo Buses	1991 to 1999		Austria; United Kingdom
B6BLE		Single deck	Volvo Buses	1999 to 2001		Sweden; United Kingdom
B6F		Single deck	Volvo Buses	1976 to 1987		Sweden
B6LE		Single deck	Volvo Buses	1995 to 1999		Sweden; United Kingdom
B7F		Single deck	Volvo Buses	1978 to present		Sweden; Brazil
B7L		Single/double deck	Volvo Buses	2000 to 2006		Sweden
B7R		Single deck	Volvo Buses	1997 to present		Sweden
B7RLE		Single deck	Volvo Buses	2001 to present		Sweden
B7TL		Double deck	Volvo Buses	1999 to 2006		Sweden; United Kingdom
B8L		Double deck	Volvo Buses	2017 to present		Sweden
B8R		Single deck	Volvo Buses	2013 to present		Sweden; Brazil
B8RLE		Single deck	Volvo Buses	2013 to present		Sweden; Brazil
B9A		Single deck	Tilling-Stevens	1927		United Kingdom
B9L		Single deck	Volvo Buses	2005 to 2013		Sweden
B9R		Single deck	Volvo Buses	2000 to present		Sweden
B9RLE		Single/double deck	Volvo Buses	2010 to 2013		Sweden
B9S		Single deck	Volvo Buses	2002 to 2011	Articulated	Sweden
B9TL		Double deck	Volvo Buses	2002 to 2017		Sweden
B10		Single deck	Volvo Buses			Sweden
B10		Single deck	BYD Auto			China
B10B		Chassis	Volvo Buses	1992 to 2001		Sweden
B10BLE		Chassis	Volvo Buses	1992 to 2004		Sweden
B10L		Chassis	Volvo Buses	1993 to 2005		Sweden
B10M		Chassis	Volvo Buses	1978 to 2001		Sweden; United Kingdom
B11R		Chassis	Volvo Buses	2011 to present		Sweden; Brazil; India
B12		Chassis	Volvo Buses	1991 to 2011		Sweden; Brazil
B12		Single deck	BYD Auto			China
B12B		Chassis	Volvo Buses	2001 to 2011		Sweden; China
B12BLE		Chassis	Volvo Buses	2001 to 2011		Sweden
B12D		Double deck	BYD Auto			China
B12M		Chassis	Volvo Buses	2001 to 2011		Sweden
B13-20		Single deck	Chavdar	1981		Hungary
B13R		Chassis	Volvo Buses	2009 to present		Sweden; Mexico
B51U		Single deck	Franz Brozincevic Wetzikon	1957 to 1977		Switzerland
B54		Single deck	Volvo Buses	1966 to 1971		Sweden
B55		Double deck	Ailsa Bus	1973 to 1985		United Kingdom
B57		Chassis	Volvo Buses	1966 to 1982		Sweden
B58		Chassis	Volvo Buses	1966 to 1982		Sweden
B59		Single deck	Volvo Buses	1970 to 1979		Sweden
B609		Single deck	Volvo Buses	1976 to 1987		Sweden
BA		Single deck	Isuzu			Japan
Bantam		Single deck	Collins Bus	1982 to 2011	School bus	USA
BC		Single deck	Isuzu	1962 to 1980		Japan
BC211M		Single deck	Zyle Daewoo	2005		South Korea
BD		Single deck	Hino Motors	1952 to 1960		Japan
BD		Single deck	Isuzu			Japan
BD11		Double deck	BYD Auto			China
Beaver		Minibus	Plaxton	1987 to 2011	Bodywork	United Kingdom
BF		Single deck	Isuzu	1964		Japan
BF105		Single deck	Zyle Daewoo	1982		South Korea
BF106		Single deck	Zyle Daewoo	2001		South Korea
BH		Single deck	Hino Motors	1950 to 1953		Japan
BH090		Single deck	Zyle Daewoo			South Korea
BH113		Single deck	Zyle Daewoo			South Korea
BH115		Single deck	Zyle Daewoo			South Korea
BH116		Single deck	Zyle Daewoo			South Korea
BH117		Single deck	Zyle Daewoo			South Korea
BH119		Single deck	Zyle Daewoo			South Korea
BH120		Single deck	Zyle Daewoo			South Korea
BL55/Jonckheere		Single deck	Brossel Jonckheere	1966 to 1970		Belgium
Blue Ribbon		Single deck	Hino Motors	1982 to present		Japan
Bluebus 12 IT2		Single deck	Bolloré	2015 to 2020		France
Bluebus 22		Single deck	Bolloré	2011 to present	Electric minibus	France
Bluetram		Single deck	Bolloré	2017 to present		France
BLxxS/Jonckheere type Standard		Single deck	Brossel Jonckheere	1968 to 1970		Belgium
BM090		Single deck	Zyle Daewoo	1996		South Korea
BMC		Single deck	BMC (Turkey)	2008 to present		Turkey
BN 8,5		Single deck	SOR Libchavy	2010 to present		Czech Republic
BN 9,5		Single deck	SOR Libchavy	2005 to present		Czech Republic
BN 10,5		Single deck	SOR Libchavy	2005 to present		Czech Republic
BN 12		Single deck	SOR Libchavy	2003 to present		Czech Republic
Bonito		Single deck	Optare	2012	Minicoaches	United Kingdom
Bravo		Single/double deck	Ayats			Spain
Bredabus 2001		Single deck	Bredabus	1988 to 1994		Italy
Bredabus 3001		Single deck	Bredabus	1988 to 1994	Also trolleybus	Italy
Bredabus 4001		Single deck	Bredabus	1988 to 1994	Articulated trolleybus	Italy
Bredabus 5001		Single deck	Bredabus	1990 to 1994		Italy
Bridgemaster		Double deck	Associated Equipment Company	1956 to 1963		United Kingdom
BS090		Single deck	Zyle Daewoo	2002		South Korea
BS105		Single deck	Zyle Daewoo	1986		South Korea
BS106		Single deck	Zyle Daewoo	1991		South Korea
BS110		Single deck	Zyle Daewoo			South Korea
BS120CN		Single deck	Zyle Daewoo			South Korea
BT 4500		Single deck	Saurer	1941 to 1945		Austria
BU		Single deck	Isuzu	1962 to 1980		Japan
Buffalo		Two-level (double deck) coach	General Motors Truck & Coach	1966		USA
BusOtto		Single deck	Autodromo	1994 to 2003	Articulated and trolleybus	Italy
BV115		Single deck	Zyle Daewoo	2010		South Korea
BX212		Single deck	Zyle Daewoo	2004		South Korea
BZL		Single/double deck	Volvo Buses	2021 to present	Battery-electric	Sweden
BZR		Chassis	Volvo Buses	2024 to present		Sweden

== C ==
List of buses: C
Name	Image	Type	Manufacturer	Year	Notes	Country
C		Single deck	Bedford Vehicles	1957		United Kingdom
C		Single deck	Isuzu	1980 to 1984		Japan
C093		Single deck	MCV_Bus_and_Coach	2023 to present	Bodywork for Volvo BZL	Egypt
C 9,5		Single deck	SOR Libchavy	1997		Czech Republic
C 9,5		Single deck	Solbus	2002 to 2007		Poland
C 10,5		Single deck	SOR Libchavy	2000		Czech Republic
C 10,5		Single deck	Solbus	2004 to 2007		Poland
C103		Single deck	MCV_Bus_and_Coach	2023 to present	Bodywork for Volvo BZL	Egypt
C 12		Single deck	SOR Libchavy	2003		Czech Republic
C 12		Single deck	TEDOM	2006 to 2012		Czech Republic
C 18		Single deck	TEDOM	2010	Articulated	Czech Republic
C 734		Single deck	Karosa			Czech Republic
C 735		Single deck	Karosa			Czech Republic
C 744		Single deck	Karosa		Articulated	Czech Republic
C 834		Single deck	Karosa			Czech Republic
C 934		Single deck	Karosa			Czech Republic
C 935		Single deck	Karosa			Czech Republic
C 943		Single deck	Karosa		Articulated	Czech Republic
C 954		Single deck	Karosa			Czech Republic
C 955		Single deck	Karosa			Czech Republic
C 956		Single deck	Karosa			Czech Republic
C2		School bus	Freightliner Trucks	2004		USA
C9		Single deck	BYD Auto	2015	Electric	China; United States
C10M		Single deck	Volvo Buses	1984 to 1987		Sweden; Switzerland; Finland
C12		Single deck	CRRC	2016	Electric	China
C37		Single deck	Marshall Bus	1993 to 1997		United Kingdom
C40U		Single deck	Franz Brozincevic Wetzikon	1960s		Switzerland
C56		Single deck	Ikarus	1998 to 2002		Hungary
C60		Single deck	Ikarus	1999		Hungary
C63		Single deck	Ikarus	1998 to 2001		Hungary
C80		Single deck	Ikarus	1998 to 2002	Articulated	Hungary
C83		Single deck	Ikarus	2000 to 2003	Articulated	Hungary
C2045		Coach	Van Hool	2001 to 2013		Made in Belgium for the North American Market
Cadet		Single deck	Carpenter Body Company	1969 to 1998	School bus	United States
Cadet / Volvo Merit		Single deck	Wrightbus		Bodywork for DAF/VDL SB120	United Kingdom
Calypso		Single deck	Duple Coachbuilders	1983 to 1984	Bodywork with Bova Europa running units	United Kingdom
Capital		Single deck	Marshall Bus (1996 to 2002); MCV Bus & Coach (2002 to 2003)	1996 to 2003	Bodywork	United Kingdom
Caribbean		Single deck	Duple Coachbuilders	1983 to 1986	Bodywork	United Kingdom
Catalyst		Single deck	Proterra	2014 to 2020		United States
CB20		Single deck	Custom Bus		Bodywork	Australia
CB30		Single deck	Custom Bus		Bodywork	Australia
CB50		Single deck	Custom Bus		Bodywork	Australia
CB60		Single deck	Vétra	1953	Trolleybus	France
CB60		Single deck	Australian Bus Manufacturing (2000 to 2004); Custom Bus (2000 to 2007)	2000 to 2007	Bodywork	Australia
CB60 Evo II		Single deck	Custom Bus	2007 to 2012	Bodywork	Australia
CB62A		Single deck	Australian Bus Manufacturing	2000 to 2002	Bodywork	Australia
CB80		Single deck	Custom Bus	2009 to 2020	Bodywork	Australia
CDi		Double deck	Bustech	2010 to present		Australia
Centro		Single deck	Plaxton	2006 to 2014	Bodywork	United Kingdom
Centro		Single deck	Otokar	2009		Turkey
Centroliner		Single/double deck	Neoplan	1997 to 2009		Germany
Centroliner Evolution		Single deck	Neoplan	2003 to 2008		Germany
Century		Single deck	Irizar		Bodywork	Spain
CF		Single deck	Bedford Vehicles		Minibus	United Kingdom
Cheetah		Single deck coach	Plaxton	1997 to 2019	Bodywork	United Kingdom
Chollima-9.25		Single deck	Pyongyang Trolleybus Factory	1963 to 1967	Articulated trolleybus	North Korea
Chollima-70		Single deck	Pyongyang Trolleybus Factory	1970 to 1972	Trolleybus	North Korea
Chollima-72		Single deck	Pyongyang Trolleybus Factory	1972 to 1974	Trolleybus	North Korea
Chollima-90		Single deck	Pyongyang Trolleybus Factory	1990 to 2003	Articulated trolleybus	North Korea
Chollima-091		Single deck	Pyongyang Trolleybus Factory	2009 to 2018	Trolleybus	North Korea
Chollima-321		Single deck	Pyongyang Trolleybus Factory	2018	Articulated trolleybus	North Korea
Chollima-862		Single deck	Pyongyang Trolleybus Factory	1986 to 1990	Articulated trolleybus	North Korea
Chorus		Minibus	Hyundai Motor Company			South Korea
Citaro		Single deck	Custom Bus	1999 to 2002	Bodywork for Mercedes-Benz O405NH	Australia
Citaro		Single deck	Mercedes-Benz	1997 to present		Germany
Citea		Single/double deck	VDL Bus & Coach	2007 to present		Netherlands
Citelis 10,5M		Single deck	Irisbus	2009 to 2013		Italy; France; Czech Republic
Citelis 12M		Single deck	Irisbus	2005 to 2014		Italy; France; Czech Republic; Romania
Citelis 18M		Single deck	Irisbus	2005 to 2013	Articulated	Italy; France; Czech Republic; Romania
Citirider		Double deck	BCI Bus	2015 to present		Australia
Cito		Single deck	Mercedes-Benz	1999 to 2003		Germany
City Master		Double deck	Yutong	2010 to present		China
City Smile		Single deck	Ursus Bus	2011		Poland
City Smile CS10E		Single deck	AMZ-Kutno Ursus Bus	2012	Electric	Poland
City Smile CS10LF		Single deck	AMZ-Kutno	2012		Poland
City Smile CS12LF		Single deck	AMZ-Kutno	2011		Poland
CityClass		Single deck	Iveco Bus	1996 to 2008	Articulated	Italy
Citycruiser T-30		Single deck	Motor Coach Industries	1979 to 1982		Canada
City Gold		Single deck	Salvador Caetano	1997 to present	Bodywork	Portugal
CityLAZ-12		Single deck	Lviv Bus Factory	2004 to 2010		Ukraine
CityLAZ-20		Single deck	Lviv Bus Factory	2007 to 2011	Articulated	Ukraine
Citymood		Single deck	Industria Italiana Autobus (IIA) branded Menarinibus	2013 to present	Diesel - CNG - Electric	Italy
CityPacer		Minibus	Optare	1985 to 1992	Bodywork	United Kingdom
Citywide		Single deck	Scania	2011 to present		Sweden
Cityzen		Double deck	East Lancashire Coachbuilders	1995 to 2000	Bodywork	United Kingdom
Civilian		Minibus	Nissan Motors	1959 to present	Originally known as the Nissan Echo	Japan
Classic		Single deck	Carpenter Body Company	1960 to 1995	School bus	USA
Classic		Single-deck	GM Canada (1982-1987); MCI (1987-1993); NovaBus (1993-1997)	1982 to 1997	Used or retired buses refurbished by Dupont Industries since 2007	Canada; USA
Classic 2000		Single deck	Carpenter Body Company	1999 to 2001	School bus	United States
Classic TC60-102N		Single deck	Motor Coach Industries	1987 to 1993	Articulated	Canada
Clipper		Single deck	Flxible	1947		USA
Clipper		Single deck	Carpenter Body Company	1985 to 1991	School bus	USA
CN 8,5		Single deck	SOR Libchavy			Czech Republic
CN 9,5		Single deck	SOR Libchavy	2007		Czech Republic
CN 10,5		Single deck	SOR Libchavy	2004		Czech Republic
CN 12		Single deck	SOR Libchavy	2004 to present		Czech Republic
Coaster		Minibus	Toyota	1969 to present		Japan
Cobra Double Decker		Double deck	Güleryüz			Turkey
Cobra GD 272		Single deck	Güleryüz			Turkey
Cobra GL 9		Single deck	Güleryüz			Turkey
Cobra GL 9L		Single deck	Güleryüz			Turkey
ColumboRider		Single deck	Optare	1990s		United Kingdom
Combi		Minibus	Kia Motors	1983 to 2002		South Korea
Commander		Single deck	Wrightbus	2002 to 2007	Bodywork for DAF/VDL SB200	United Kingdom
Commando		Single deck	Commer	1946		United Kingdom
CompoBus		Single deck	NABI	2002 to 2013		USA
Consort		Single deck	Wrightbus		Bodywork	United Kingdom
Contour (body)		Single-deck coach	Wrightbus	1982 to 1987	Bodywork	United Kingdom
Contour		Coach	King Long; Wrightbus	2025 to present	Bodywork	China; United Kingdom
Cougar		Single deck	Alternative Chassis Engineering	1991		United Kingdom
Counselor		Single deck	Carpenter Body Company	1989 to 1999	School bus	United States
Convoy		Minibus	LDV Group	1996 to 2006		United Kingdom
County		Single deck	Hyundai Motor Company	1998 to present		South Korea
Courier 95 Skyview		Single deck	Motor Coach Industries	1953 to 1960		Canada
CR221L		Single deck	Volgren		Bodywork	Australia
CR222L		Single deck	Volgren		Bodywork	Australia
CR222LD		Double deck	Volgren		Bodywork	Australia
CR223LD		Double deck	Volgren		Bodywork	Australia
CR224L		Single deck	Volgren		Bodywork	Australia
CR225L		Single deck	Volgren		Bodywork	Australia
CR226L		Single deck	Volgren		Bodywork	Australia
CR228L		Single deck	Volgren		Bodywork	Australia
Crealis Neo		Single deck	Iveco Bus	2008 to present	Articulated	Italy
Crossway		Single deck	Iveco Bus	2006 to present		France; Czech Republic
Crusader		Single deck	Wrightbus	1995 to 2002	Bodywork	United Kingdom
CTS FE		Single deck	Champion Bus			USA
CTS RE		Single deck	Champion Bus			USA
Cub		Midibus	Leyland Bus	1979		United Kingdom
Cub		Minibus	LDV Group	1996 to 2001		United Kingdom
Cubic		Single deck	Isuzu	1984 to 2000		Japan
CX35		Coach	Van Hool	2015 to present		Made in Belgium for the North American Market
CX45		Coach	Van Hool	2013 to present		Made in Belgium for the North American market

== D ==
List of buses: D
Name	Image	Type	Manufacturer	Year	Notes	Country
D113		Double deck	MCV_Bus_and_Coach	2023 to present	Bodywork for Volvo BZL	Egypt
D45 CRT LE		Single deck	Motor Coach Industries	2017		Canada
D4000CL		Single deck	Motor Coach Industries	2001		Canada
D4500CT		Single deck	Motor Coach Industries	2001		Canada
DAC 112 UDM		Single deck	Rocar	1982 to 2000		Romania
DAC 117 UD		Single deck	Rocar	1979 to 1998	Articulated	Romania
DAC 212 E		Single deck	Rocar		Trolleybus	Romania
DAC 217 E		Single deck	Rocar		Articulated trolleybus	Romania
DAC UDAN 2002		Single deck	Rocar			Romania
Daily		Minibus	Iveco Bus	1978 to present		Italy
Dart		Single deck	Dennis / TransBus / Alexander Dennis	1989 to 2008		United Kingdom
Dartline		Single deck	Duple Coachbuilders; Carlyle Works; Marshall Bus	1989 to 1993		United Kingdom
Dash		Single deck	Walter Alexander Coachbuilders	1991 to 1997	Bodywork	United Kingdom
DB250		Double deck	DAF Bus/VDL Bus	1991 to 2006	Originally launched as the DAF DB250	Netherlands
DD102		Double deck	Manufacturing Commercial Vehicles			
DB300		Double deck	VDL/Wrightbus		Bodywork	Egypt
DD103		Double deck	Manufacturing Commercial Vehicles	2011 to 2014	Bodywork for Volvo B9TL	Egypt
DE		Double deck	Büssing	1952		Germany
Delta		Single deck	Optare	1988	Bodywork	United Kingdom
Diamond		Single deck	TEMSA	2003		Turkey
Derwent 3000		Single deck	Plaxton	1986 to 1991	Bodywork	United Kingdom
Diamond		Single deck	TEMSA	2003		Turkey
DMA-460LF		Single deck	Neoplan USA		Articulated trolleybus	USA
Dominant		Single deck	Duple Coachbuilders	1972 to 1982	Bodywork	United Kingdom
Dominator		Single/double deck	Dennis Specialist Vehicles	1977 to 1996		United Kingdom
Domino		Single deck	Dennis Bros	1984 to 1985		United Kingdom
Domino		Single deck	Iveco Domino GTS (1988-2001); Irisbus Domino 2001 (2001-2007); Irisbus New Domino (2007-2011)	1988 to 2011		Italy
DownTown		Single deck	Iveco	1998 to 2000		Italy
Dorchester		Single deck	Dennis Bros	1983 to 1988		United Kingdom
Dragon		Double deck	Dennis Bros	1982 to 1999		United Kingdom
Droop Nose		Double deck	East Lancashire Coachbuilders	1984	East Lancs 1984-style double-deck body	United Kingdom
Ducato		Single deck	Fiat	1981 to present	Minibus	Italy
Durastar		Single deck	Navistar International			USA

== E ==
List of buses: E
Name	Image	Type	Manufacturer	Year	Notes	Country
E10		Single deck	Yutong	2016 to present	Electric bus	China
E12		Single deck	Yutong	2016 to present	Electric bus	China
E 12		Single deck	King Long	2014 to present	Hybrid-electric	China
e1		Single deck	Switch Mobility	2022	Electric bus	United Kingdom
E14		Single deck	Ikarus	1988		Hungary
E91		Single deck	Ikarus	1997		Hungary
E94		Single deck	Ikarus	1997 to 2006		Hungary
E95		Single deck	Ikarus	1992 to 2005		Hungary
E99		Double deck	Ikarus	1995		Hungary
E186		Single deck	Yuzhmash	2005 to 2006	Trolleybus	Ukraine
E187		Single deck	Yuzhmash	2007 to 2008	Trolleybus	Ukraine
E Type		Double deck	East Lancashire Coachbuilders		Bodywork	United Kingdom
EBN 9,5		Single deck	SOR Libchavy	2016 to present	Electric	Czech Republic
EBN 10,5		Single deck	SOR Libchavy	2010 to present	Electric	Czech Republic
Ebus		Single deck	BYD Auto	2010 to present	Electric	China
Eclipse		Single deck	Wrightbus	2000 to 2019	Bodywork	United Kingdom
Eclipse Fusion		Single deck	Wrightbus		Articulated bodywork for Volvo B7LA	United Kingdom
Eclipse Gemini		Double deck	Wrightbus		Bodywork for Volvo low-floor double-deckers	United Kingdom
Eclipse SchoolRun		School bus	Wrightbus		Bodywork for Volvo B7R	United Kingdom
EcoRide		Single deck	Proterra	2010 to 2014	Electric	United States
Effeuno		Single deck	Iveco	1984 to 1990	IVECO 471 (urban); IVECO 571 (suburban); IVECO 671 (interurban)	Italy
Ego		Single deck			Bodywork	United Kingdom
EiV 12		Single deck	Switch Mobility	2022 to present	Electric	India
EiV 22		Double deck	Switch Mobility	2022 to present	Electric	India
EL2000		Single deck	East Lancashire Coachbuilders		Bodywork	United Kingdom
Electrocity		Single deck	Wrightbus	2002 to 2013	Hybrid-electric	United Kingdom
Element		Single deck	Custom Denning			Australia
Elite		Coach	Plaxton		Bodywork	United Kingdom
Endeavour		Single deck	Custom Denning	2019 to present	Bodywork	Australia
Endurance		Single deck	Wrightbus	1992 to 1997	Bodywork	United Kingdom
Enviro100EV		Midibus	Alexander Dennis	2023		United Kingdom
Enviro200 (TransBus)		Single deck	TransBus International	2003		United Kingdom
Enviro200 (Alexander Dennis)		Single deck	Alexander Dennis	2006	Available as complete bus, chassis or bodywork	United Kingdom
Enviro200 MMC		Single deck	Alexander Dennis	2014 to present	Available as complete bus or bodywork	United Kingdom
Enviro200EV		Single deck	Alexander Dennis; BYD Auto	2015 to present	Battery-electric	United Kingdom
Enviro300 (TransBus)		Single deck	TransBus	2001 to 2008	Available as complete bus, chassis or bodywork	United Kingdom
Enviro300 (Alexander Dennis)		Single deck	Alexander Dennis	2007 to 2015	Available as complete bus, chassis or bodywork	United Kingdom
Enviro350H		Single deck	Alexander Dennis			United Kingdom
Enviro400		Double deck	Alexander Dennis	2005 to 2018	Available as complete bus, chassis or bodywork	United Kingdom
Enviro400 City		Double deck	Alexander Dennis	2015 to present	Available as complete bus or bodywork	United Kingdom
Enviro400EV		Double deck	Alexander Dennis; BYD Auto	2018 to present	Available as battery electric or fuel cell bus	United Kingdom
Enviro400 MMC		Double deck	Alexander Dennis	2014 to present	Available as complete bus or bodywork	United Kingdom
Enviro500		Double deck	Alexander Dennis	2002 to 2014	Available as complete bus, chassis or bodywork	United Kingdom
Enviro500EV		Double deck	Alexander Dennis	2021 to present	Battery electric	United Kingdom
Enviro500 MMC		Double deck	Alexander Dennis	2012 to present		United Kingdom
Eptajota		Single deck	Lancia	1928		Italy
Erga		Single deck	Isuzu	2000 to present		Japan
Erga DUO		Single deck	Isuzu	2020	Articulated	Japan
Erga J		Single deck	Isuzu			Japan
Erga Mio		Single deck	Isuzu	1999 to present		Japan
Esajota		Single deck	Lancia	1926		Italy
Esteem		Single deck	East Lancashire Coachbuilders; Optare		Bodywork, originally launched as East Lancs Esteem	United Kingdom
EuroClass		Single deck	Iveco (1993-2002); Irisbus (2002-2006)	1993 to 2006		Italy
Eurolider 9		Single deck	Autosan	2013		Poland
Eurolider 12		Single deck	Autosan	2009		Poland
Eurolider 13		Single deck	Autosan	2009		Poland
Eurolider 15LE		Single deck	Autosan	2010		Poland
European		Single deck	East Lancashire Coachbuilders		Bodywork	United Kingdom
Europolis		Single deck	Cacciamali 1996 to 1999; Iveco 199 to 2001; Irisbus 2002 to 2010	1996 to 2010	Electric - diesel - CNG	Italy
Evadys		Single deck	Iveco Bus	2016 to present		Czech Republic
Evolution		Single deck	Manufacturing Commercial Vehicles	2003 to present	Bodywork	United Kingdom
Evora		Single deck	Manufacturing Commercial Vehicles	2018 to present	Bodywork	Egypt
EvoSeti		Double deck	Manufacturing Commercial Vehicles	2015 to present	Bodywork	Egypt
EvoTor (523)		Single deck	Manufacturing Commercial Vehicles	2018 to present	Bodywork	Egypt
EX 15		Single deck	Van Hool	2014 to present		Macedonia
EX 16		Single deck	Van Hool	2014 to present		Macedonia
Excel		Single deck	Optare	1995		United Kingdom
EZ Trans		Single deck	Champion Bus	2000s		USA
E-Z Rider		Single deck	ENC	1996 to 2001		USA
E-Z Rider II		Single deck	ENC	2001 to present	Three lengths; facelifted twice	USA

== F ==
List of buses: F
Name	Image	Type	Manufacturer	Year	Notes	Country
F4		Single deck	Sunbeam		Trolleybus	United Kingdom
F4A		Double deck	Sunbeam	1948 to 1965	Trolleybus	United Kingdom
F94		Single deck	Scania		Bodywork	Sweden; Brazil
F3500		Single deck	Motor Coach Industries	2000 to 2003		Canada
Falcon		Single/double deck	Dennis Bros	1981 to 1993		United Kingdom
FB		Single deck	Hyundai Motor Company			South Korea
Fencer		Single deck/double deck	Scania			Sweden
Fennec		Single deck	SNVI	2016		Algeria
Fibird		Single deck	Edison Motors	2017 to 2021		South Korea
Fleetline		Single/double deck	Daimler; Leyland Motors	1960 to 1980		United Kingdom
Flxette		Single deck	Flxible	1984	Minibus	USA
Flyte		Single deck	East Lancashire Coachbuilders	1996 to 2001	Bodywork	United Kingdom
Fortuna		Single deck	MAN Truck & Bus	2004 to 2006		Germany
FR1		Single deck	Renault Vehicles Industries	1983 to 1996		France
Freeline		Single deck	Daimler	1951 to 1964		United Kingdom
FS-65		School bus	Freightliner Trucks	1997 to 2007		USA
Fusion		Single deck	Wrightbus	1998 to 1999	Articulated bodywork for Volvo B10LA	United Kingdom
Futura		Single/double deck	VDL (originally Bova)	1982 to present		Netherlands
Futurliner		Single deck	General Motors Truck & Coach	1939		USA
FX116 Cruising Arrow		Single deck	Zyle Daewoo	2004		South Korea
FX120 Cruising Star		Single deck	Zyle Daewoo			South Korea
FX212 Super Cruiser		Single deck	Daewoo Bus	2007 to present		South Korea

== G ==
List of buses: G
Name	Image	Type	Manufacturer	Year	Notes	Country
G1A		Single deck	AvtoKuban	1967 to 1975	Minibus	Soviet Union
G1A1		Single deck	AvtoKuban	1975 to 1982	Minibus	Soviet Union
G1A1-2		Single deck	AvtoKuban	1967 to 1975	Minibus	Soviet Union
G4500		Single deck	Motor Coach Industries	2000 to 2005		Canada
Gala		Single deck	Isuzu	1996		Japan
Gala Mio		Single deck	Isuzu	1999		Japan
GAZ-03-30		Single deck	GAZ	1933 to 1950		Russia
GB Hawk		Single deck	Wrightbus	2021 to 2022		United Kingdom
GB Kite		Single deck	Wrightbus	2022	Offered as battery electric Electroliner or fuel cell electric Hydroliner	United Kingdom
Gemini 2		Double deck	Wrightbus	2007 to 2013	Hybrid-electric	United Kingdom
Globus		Single deck				India
GM Standard		Double deck body	Park Royal; Northern Counties		Design exclusive to SELNEC/Greater Manchester Passenger Transport Executive	United Kingdom
Grand Bantam		Single deck	Collins Bus	1992 to 2011	Schoolbus	USA
Granbird		Single deck coach	Kia Motors	1994 to present		South Korea
Green City		Single deck bus	Hyundai Motor Company			South Korea
Greenway		Single deck	East Lancashire Coachbuilders		Leyland National rebuilt by East Lancs	United Kingdom
Grumman 870		Single deck	Grumman; Flxible	1978 to 1983	Succeeded by the similar Flxible Metro, listed below (under Metro)	USA
GT12		Single deck	Yutong	2015 to present	Coach	China
GT 560 640-25		Single deck	Saurer	1978 to 1983	Trolleybus	Switzerland
GTS-1		Single deck	GS Specialist Vehicles	2006 to present	Amphibious	Malta
GX 44		Single deck	Heuliez Bus	1986 to 1991		France
GX 77H		Single deck	Heuliez Bus	1990 to 1999		France
GX 107		Single deck	Heuliez Bus	1984 to 1996		France
GX 117		Single deck	Heuliez Bus	1998 to 2006		France
GX 127		Single deck	Heuliez Bus	2005 to 2014		France
GX 137		Single deck	Heuliez Bus	2005 to present		France
GX 187		Single deck	Heuliez Bus	1984 to 1996	Articulated	France
GX 217		Single deck	Heuliez Bus	1996 to 2001		France
GX 317		Single deck	Heuliez Bus	1994 to 2005		France
GX 327		Single deck	Heuliez Bus	2005 to 2014		France
GX 337		Single deck	Heuliez Bus	2013 to present		France
GX 417		Single deck	Heuliez Bus	1995 to 2000	Articulated	France
GX 427		Single deck	Heuliez Bus	2007 to 2014	Articulated	France
GX 437		Single deck	Heuliez Bus	2014 to present	Articulated	France
GX Linium		Single deck	Heuliez Bus	2017 to present		France

== H ==
List of buses: H
Name	Image	Type	Manufacturer	Year	Notes	Country
H		Single deck	Bristol Commercial Vehicles	1931		United Kingdom
H3-45		Coach	Prevost Car	1992 to present		USA, Canada
H3B		Single deck	IFA	1950 to 1958		Germany
H6		Single deck	Autosan	1992 to 2000	Minibus	Poland
H6B		Single deck	IFA	1952 to 1959		East Germany
H7		Single deck	Autosan	2000 to 2006		Poland
H9		Single deck	Autosan	1973 to 2006		Poland
H10		Single deck	Autosan	1984 to 2003		Poland
H350		Minibus	Hyundai Motor Company	2014 to present		South Korea
Handybus		Single deck	Wrightbus	1990 to 1995	Bodywork	United Kingdom
HD		Single deck	TEMSA			Turkey
HiAce		Minibus	Toyota	1967 to present		Japan
Hispano Globus		Single deck	Tata Motors			India
High Floor		Single Deck	New Flyer Industries	1987 to 2006		Canada
HS 160		Single deck	Henschel & Son	1955 to 1963	Articulated / trolleybus	Germany

== I ==
List of buses: I
Name	Image	Type	Manufacturer	Year	Notes	Country
Ie tram		Single deck	Irizar		Battery-electric	Spain
I330		Single deck	Inbus	1984 to 1990		Italy
I410		Single deck	Rocar De Simon			Romania
ICN 12		Single deck	SOR Libchavy	2012		Czech Republic
IK-4		Single deck	Ikarbus	1970s		Serbia
IK-103		Single deck	Ikarbus	1993 to 2016		Serbia
IK-104		Single deck	Ikarbus	1994 to 2006		Serbia
IK-107		Single deck	Ikarbus	2006	Minibus	Serbia
IK-111		Single deck	Ikarbus	1996		Serbia
IK-112		Single deck	Ikarbus	2003		Serbia
IK-160		Single deck	Ikarbus	1988	Articulated	Serbia
IK-161		Single deck	Ikarbus	1996	Articulated	Serbia
IK-201		Single deck	Ikarbus	1993 to 2006	Articulated	Serbia
IK-202		Single deck	Ikarbus	1996 to 2005	Articulated	Serbia
IK-206		Single deck	Ikarbus	2006 to present	Articulated	Serbia
IK-218		Single deck	Ikarbus	2004		Serbia
IK-308		Single deck	Ikarbus		Midibus	Serbia
IK-312		Single deck	Ikarbus			Serbia
Impulse		Single deck	Goshen Coach		Cutaway bus	USA
Inobus SGL 290		Single deck	INKA	2019		Indonesia
Integro		Single deck	Mercedes-Benz	1996 to present		Germany
InterUrbino		Single deck	Solaris Bus & Coach	2010 to present		Poland
Intouro		Single deck	Mercedes-Benz	1999 to present		Germany
Invero		Single deck	New Flyer Industries	2002 to 2007		Canada; USA

== J ==
List of buses: J
Name	Image	Type	Manufacturer	Year	Notes	Country
J4500		Single deck	Motor Coach Industries	2001		Canada
J		Single deck	Bedford Vehicles	1958 to 1976	Minibus	United Kingdom
Jetbus		Double deck	Adi Putro	2019 to present		Indonesia
Javelin		Single deck	Dennis Specialist Vehicles	1987 to 2010		United Kingdom
JanBus		Single deck	Ashok Leyland	2010 to present		India
JJL		Single deck	Bedford Vehicles	1979		United Kingdom
JNP6105GR		Single deck	Youngman	2012 to present	Based on the Neoplan Centroliner	China
JNP6120G		Single deck	Youngman	2005 to present	Based on the Neoplan Centroliner	China
JNP6122GR1		Single deck	Youngman			China
JNP6130GSC		Double deck	Youngman			China
JNP6140GVC		Single deck	Youngman		Based on the Neoplan Centroliner	China
JNP6180G		Single deck	Youngman		Articulated; Based on the Neoplan Centroliner	China
JNP6181GVC		Single deck	Youngman		Articulated	China
JNP6250G		Single deck	Youngman	2007	Bi-articulated	China
JO		Single deck	Bristol Commercial Vehicles	1933		United Kingdom
Journey		Minibus	Isuzu	1970 to present	OEM of Nissan Civilian since 1993	Japan
Journey-E		Single deck	Isuzu			Japan
Journey-K		Single deck	Isuzu	1984 to 1999		Japan
Journey-J		Single deck	Isuzu			Japan
Journey-Q		Single deck	Isuzu	1976 to 2001		Japan
Jubilant		Double deck	Dennis Bros	1977		United Kingdom
Jumbocruiser		Double deck	Neoplan	1975	4-axle articulated coach	Germany

== K ==
List of buses: K
Name	Image	Type	Manufacturer	Year	Notes	Country
K		Double deck	Bristol Commercial Vehicles	1937		United Kingdom
K-series		Single/double deck	Scania	2006 to present		Sweden
K-type		Double deck	Associated Equipment Company	1919 to 1926		United Kingdom
K9		Single deck	BYD Auto	2010	Electric	China; United States
K94		Single/double deck	Scania			Sweden
K114		Single deck	Scania			Sweden
K124		Single/double deck	Scania			Sweden
K4016TD		Single	Neoplan Polska	1998 to 1999		Poland
KD		Double deck	GAC Ireland	1980 to 1983		Ireland
KE		Single deck	GAC Ireland	1980 to 1981		Ireland
Kent		Single deck	Otokar	2010		Turkey
Kinetec		Single deck	East Lancashire Coachbuilders		Bodywork	United Kingdom
Kinetec+		Double deck	East Lancashire Coachbuilders		Bodywork	United Kingdom
KR		Single deck	GAC Ireland	1985 to 1986		Ireland
Kronos 122		Single deck	TEDOM	2006		Czech Republic
Kronos 123		Single deck	TEDOM	2004 to 2006		Czech Republic
KS		Double deck	Bristol Commercial Vehicles	1950		United Kingdom
KSW		Double deck	Bristol Commercial Vehicles	1950		United Kingdom

== L ==
List of buses: L
Name	Image	Type	Manufacturer	Year	Notes	Country
L		Single deck	Bristol Commercial Vehicles	1937		United Kingdom
L 12		Single deck	TEDOM	2006 to 2012		Czech Republic
L 319		Minibus	Mercedes-Benz	1955		Germany
L4C Alpenwagen III		Single deck	Saurer	1953		Switzerland
L11		Single deck	Jelcz	1987 to 1989		Poland
L94		Single deck	Scania	1997 to 2006		Sweden
L081MB		Single deck	Jelcz	2000 to 2008		Poland
L090M		Single deck	Jelcz	1999 to 2006		Poland
L100		Single deck	Jelcz	2000 to 2004		Poland
L113		Single deck	Scania	1989 to 1998		Sweden
Lance		Single deck chassis	Dennis Bros	1991 to 2000		United Kingdom
Lancet		Single deck	Dennis Bros	1981 to 1991		United Kingdom
Lander		Single deck	BredaMenarinibus	2008 to 2013		Italy
Laser		Single deck	Duple Coachbuilders	1983 to 1986	Bodywork	United Kingdom
LC 9,5		Single deck	SOR Libchavy	1998		Czech Republic
LC 10,5		Single deck	SOR Libchavy	2002		Czech Republic
LC 735		Single deck	Karosa			Czech Republic
LC 736		Single deck	Karosa			Czech Republic
LC 737		Single deck	Karosa			Czech Republic
LC 757		Single deck	Karosa			Czech Republic
LC 936		Single deck	Karosa			Czech Republic
LC 937		Single deck	Karosa			Czech Republic
LC 956		Single deck	Karosa			Czech Republic
LC 957		Single deck	Karosa			Czech Republic
LC-51		Single deck	Chavdar			Hungary
LD		Single deck	TEMSA			Turkey
Legionnaire		Single deck	Thomas Harrington & Sons		Bodywork	United Kingdom
Leopard		Single deck	Leyland Motors	1959		United Kingdom
Leopard		Single deck	Plaxton	2013		United Kingdom
Lestar		Single deck	Zyle Daewoo	2013		South Korea
Levante		Single deck	Salvador Caetano	2005 to present	Bodywork	United Kingdom
Lexio		Single deck	VDL Bova	2005 to 2010		Netherlands
LF		Single deck	TEMSA			Turkey
LFS		Single deck	Nova Bus	1996 to present		Canada
LH		Single deck	Bristol Commercial Vehicles	1967 to 1982		United Kingdom
LH 9,5		Single deck	SOR Libchavy	2002		Czech Republic
LH 10,5		Single deck	SOR Libchavy	2001		Czech Republic
LH 12		Single deck	SOR Libchavy	2005 to present		Czech Republic
Liberator		Single deck	Wrightbus		Bodywork for Volvo B10L	United Kingdom
Liesse		Minibus	Hino Motors	1995		Japan
lighTram 3		Single deck	Hess	2007	Bi-articulated	Switzerland
Lion PSR1		Single deck	Leyland Motors	1960		United Kingdom
Lion's Classic		Single deck	MAN Truck & Bus	2000 to present		Germany
Lion's City		Single/double deck	MAN Truck & Bus	1996 to present		Germany
Lion's Coach		Single deck	MAN Truck & Bus	1996 to present		Germany
Lion's Intercity		Single deck	MAN Truck & Bus	2015 to present		Germany
Lion's Regio		Single deck	MAN Truck & Bus	2004 to 2017		Germany
LionC		Single deck	Lion Electric Company	2015	Electric School bus	Canada
LionM		Single deck	Lion Electric Company	2018	Electric midibus	Canada
LL		Single deck	Bristol Commercial Vehicles	1946		United Kingdom
Lodekka		Double deck	Bristol Commercial Vehicles	1949		United Kingdom
Loline		Double deck	Dennis Bros	1958 to 1967		United Kingdom
Lolyne		Double deck	East Lancashire Coachbuilders		Bodywork for Dennis Trident 2	United Kingdom
Lorraine		Single deck	Iveco	1981 to 1993	Based on Fiat 370	France
Low Floor		Single deck	Gillig Corporation	1996-2009 (Advantage); 2010-present (Low Floor)		USA
Low Floor		Single Deck	New Flyer Industries	1989-2013 (LF Series); 2005-2014 (LFR Series)		Canada
Lowlander		Double deck	Albion Motors	1961		United Kingdom
Lowlander		Double deck	East Lancashire Coachbuilders		Bodywork for DAF DB250, not built	
LS		Single deck	Bristol Commercial Vehicles	1950		United Kingdom
LT		Single deck	Isuzu	2000		Japan
LU 200 M11		Single deck	Gräf & Stift	1978 to 1992		Austria
Luna		Single deck	Neobus			Serbia
LWL		Single deck	Bristol Commercial Vehicles	1946		United Kingdom
Lynx		Single deck	Leyland Bus	1984		United Kingdom

== M ==
List of buses: M
Name	Image	Type	Manufacturer	Year	Notes	Country
M-type		Single deck	Sumida	1933 to 1937		Japan
M083C Libero		Single deck	Jelcz	2007 to 2008		Poland
M1 'Roksana'		Single deck	Riga Autobus Factory	1991	Minibus	Latvia
M2 'Stils'		Single deck	Riga Autobus Factory	1994	Minibus	Latvia
M11		Single deck	Jelcz	1989 to 1992		Poland
M101I		Single deck	Jelcz	2001 to 2008		Poland
M120NM		Single deck	Jelcz	1996		Poland
M121		Single deck	Jelcz	2000 to 2004		Poland
M121E		Single deck	Jelcz	1999 to 2001	Trolleybus	Poland
M121I		Single deck	Jelcz	2005 to 2008		Poland
M121M		Single deck	Jelcz	1995 to 2004		Poland
M121MB		Single deck	Jelcz	1995 to 2007		Poland
M121M/4 CNG		Single deck	Jelcz	2006 to 2008		Poland
M122		Single deck	Jelcz	1995 to 1997		Poland
M125M		Single deck	Jelcz	1998 to 2006		Poland
M125M/4 CNG		Single deck	Jelcz	2003 to 2006		Poland
M180		Single deck	Jelcz	1992 to 1993		Poland
M181M		Single deck	Jelcz	1997 to 2000	Articulated	Poland
M181MB		Single deck	Jelcz	1996 to 2008	Articulated	Poland
Magelys		Single deck	Iveco Bus	2007 to present		Czech Republic
Mancunian		Double deck			Bodywork	United Kingdom
Maraton		Single deck	TEMSA	1987		Turkey
Marcopolo Starbus		Single deck	Tata Marcopolo	2008		India
Mars		Single deck	Merkavim			Israel
Master		Minibus	Marshall Bus		Bodywork for Mercedes-Benz Vario	
MAT Oławka		Single deck	Jelcz	1964 to 1965		Poland
MaxCi		Single deck	East Lancashire Coachbuilders		Bodywork	
Maxus		Minibus	LDV Group	2004 to 2009		United Kingdom
MB200		Single deck	DAF	1965		Netherlands
MC-5		Single deck	Motor Coach Industries	1963 to 1980		Canada
MC-6		Single deck	Motor Coach Industries	1968 to 1969		Canada
MC-8		Single deck	Motor Coach Industries	1973 to 1978		Canada
MC-9		Single deck	Motor Coach Industries	1978 to 1991		Canada
MC-12		Single deck	Motor Coach Industries	1991 to 1998		Canada
MCW Metrobus		Double deck	Metro Cammell Weymann	1977 to 1989		United Kingdom
MD 9		Single deck	TEMSA	2010		Turkey
MD 9 LE		Single deck	TEMSA	2012		Turkey
MDi		Single deck	Bustech		Bodywork	Australia
Megaliner		Double deck	Neoplan	1983 to 2000	Double deck or Articulated	Germany
Megapolis		Single deck	Trolza	2005 to 2019	Trolleybus	Russia
Melpha		Single deck	Hino Motors	1998		Japan
Meridian		Single deck	Wrightbus	2007	Bodywork for MAN A22	
Metro 40102		Single deck	Flxible	1992		USA
Metro		Single deck	Flxible	1983 to 1995	See also the related, predecessor model, the Grumman 870, above.	USA
Metro		Single deck	Iveco Bus	2005 to present		France
Metrobus		Single deck	MAN and Krauss-Maffei; Autobuzul Bucharest; Ikarus Zemun	1959 to 1981	Production between 1959 and 1973. Licensed production as Roman 111/112 (1974-1980), and Ikarus MAN IK-5/6 (1972-1981)	Germany; Romania; Yugoslavia
MetroCity		Single deck	Optare	2013		United Kingdom
MetroDecker		Double deck	Optare	2014		United Kingdom
Metroliner		Single/double deck	Metro Cammell Weymann	1983		United Kingdom
Metrolink		Single deck	Scania	2013 to 2018		India
Metropolitan		Double deck	Saab-Scania and Metro Cammell Weymann	1973	Scania BR111DH underframe with MCW bodywork	Sweden
Metrorider		Single deck	Metro Cammell Weymann	1986		United Kingdom
MetroRider		Single deck	Optare	1989		United Kingdom
MetroVan		Single deck	U.S. Bus	2000s	School bus	USA
Metro-Scania		Single deck	Saab-Scania and Metro Cammell Weymann	1969-1973	Scania BR110 underframe with MCW bodywork	Sweden
MF2B		Single deck	Sunbeam	1934 to 1965	Trolleybus	United Kingdom
MG 36 / MG 50		Single deck	Gruau	1989 to 1996		France
Micro Bird		School bus	Blue Bird Body Company (1948-1992); Blue Bird Corporation (1992–present)	1975		USA
Microbus		Single deck	Gruau	2004 to 2011	Minibus	France
Mighty Mite		Single deck	Thomas Built Buses	1980s to 1990s	School bus	United States
Miles		Single deck	Bianchi	1940 to 1950		Italy
Mille Aerfer		Single deck	Alfa Romeo	1960 to 1963	Trollleybus	Italy
Mille AF		Single deck	Alfa Romeo	1959 to 1964	Trollleybus	Italy
Mini Bird		School bus	Blue Bird Corporation	1977 to 2005		USA
Minotour		School bus	Thomas Built Buses	1980		USA
Moveo		Single deck	Kapena	2017 to 2018		Poland
Monocar 110		Single deck	Carrozzeria Menarini	1984 to 1989		Italy
Monocar 120		Single deck	Carrozzeria Menarini	1988 to 2001		Italy
Monocar 201		Single deck	Carrozzeria Menarini	1979 to 1989		Italy
Monocar 220		Single deck	Carrozzeria Menarini	1989 to 1999		Italy
Monocar 221		Single deck	BredaMenarinibus	1995 to 1998		Italy
Monocar 230		Single deck	BredaMenarinibus	1993 to 1998		Italy
Monocar 231		Single deck	BredaMenarinibus	2000 to 2005		Italy
Monocar 240		Single deck	BredaMenarinibus	1998 to 2005		Italy
Monocar 321		Single deck	BredaMenarinibus	1995 to 1998	Articulated	Italy
MS2		Double deck	Sunbeam	1934 to 1948	Trolleybus	United Kingdom
MST II		Single deck	ElDorado National–California			USA
MultiClass S 300		Single deck	Setra			Germany
MultiClass S 400		Single deck	Setra			Germany
MW		Single deck	Bristol Commercial Vehicles	1956 to 1967		United Kingdom
Myllennium Lolyne		Double deck	East Lancashire Coachbuilders		Bodywork for Dennis Trident 2	
Myllennium Lowlander		Double deck	East Lancashire Coachbuilders		Bodywork for DAF/VDL DB250	
Myllennium Nordic		Double deck	East Lancashire Coachbuilders		Bodywork for tri-axle Volvo B9TL	
Myllennium Vyking		Double deck	East Lancashire Coachbuilders		Bodywork for Volvo B7TL	
Myllennium		Single deck	East Lancashire Coachbuilders		Bodywork	
MyWay		Single deck	Iveco-Irisbus	1999 to 2007		Italy

== N ==
List of buses: N
Name	Image	Type	Manufacturer	Year	Notes	Country
N-series		Single/double deck	Scania	2007–present		Sweden
N52		Single deck	SFA	1952 to 1957		Poland
N94		Single/double deck	Scania	1997 to 2006		Sweden
N112		Single/double deck	Scania	1978 to 1987		Sweden
N113		Single/double deck	Scania	1988 to 2000		Sweden
N407		Single deck	Neoplan	1989 to 1992		Germany
N4009		Single deck	Neoplan	1988 to 1999		Germany/Poland
N4016		Single deck	Neoplan	1988 to 1999		Germany/Poland
N4020		Single deck	Neoplan	1993 to 1999		Germany/Poland
N4021		Single deck	Neoplan	1988 to 1999	Articulated	Germany/Poland
National		Single deck	Leyland Motors	1972 to 1985		United Kingdom
Navigo		Single deck	Otokar	2008 to Present		Turkey
NB 12		Single deck	SOR Libchavy	2008 to present		Czech Republic
NB 18		Single deck	SOR Libchavy	2008 to present	Articulated	Czech Republic
NC		Double deck	Foden	1975 to 1978		United Kingdom
NC 18		Single deck	SOR Libchavy	2008 to 2015		Czech Republic
NDO		Single deck	Praga	1938 to 1948		Czech Republic
Neocity		Single deck	BMC	2017 to present		Turkey
NeoLAZ		Single deck	Lviv Bus Factory			Ukraine
Neretva		Single deck	Tvornica Autobusa Zagreb		Minibus	Croatia
New Look (Flxible)		Single-deck	Flxible	1960 to 1978		USA
New Look (GMC)		Single-deck	General Motors Truck & Coach	1959 to 1986	US version ceased production in 1977; Canadian version ended production in 1986.	USA
New Routemaster		Double deck	Wrightbus	2011 to 2017		United Kingdom
NexBus		Single deck	Collins Bus	2012	School bus	USA
NG 272		Single deck	MAN Truck & Bus	1990 to 1992	Articulated	Germany
NG 272(2)		Single deck	MAN Truck & Bus	1992 to 2000	Articulated	Germany
Nimbus		Single deck	Albion Motors	1953		United Kingdom
Nimbus		Single deck	Salvador Caetano	1999 to 2007	Bodywork	United Kingdom
Nimbus		Single deck	Wrightbus		Bodywork	United Kingdom
NL 202		Single deck	MAN Truck & Bus	1989 to 1992		Germany
NL 262		Single deck	MAN Truck & Bus	1992 to 1998		Germany
NL 263		Single deck	MAN Truck & Bus	1998 to 2007		Germany
NL 273		Single deck	MAN Truck & Bus	2008 to 2009		Germany
NM 152		Single deck	MAN Truck & Bus	1990 to 1993		Germany
NM 152(2)		Single deck	MAN Truck & Bus	1993 to 1998		Germany
NM 223		Single deck	MAN Truck & Bus	1997 to 2005		Germany
NMT 222		Single deck	MAN Truck & Bus	1999 to 2000	Trolleybus	Germany
NO		Single deck	Praga	1925 to 1926		Czech Republic
Nordic		Double deck	East Lancashire Coachbuilders			United Kingdom
NS 12		Single deck	SOR Libchavy	2016	Articulated	Czech Republic
NS 18		Single deck	SOR Libchavy		Articulated	Czech Republic
Numidia Lux		Single deck	SNVI	2016		Algeria

== O ==
List of buses: O
Name	Image	Type	Manufacturer	Year	Notes	Country
O 302		Single deck	Mercedes-Benz	1965 to 1976		Germany
O 303		Single deck	Mercedes-Benz	1974 to 1992		Germany
O 305		Single/double deck	Mercedes-Benz	1969 to 1987		Germany
O 305		Single deck	Heuliez Bus	1975 to 1984		France
O 309		Minibus	Mercedes-Benz	1967 to 1986		Germany
O 370		Single deck	Mercedes-Benz			Brazil
O 371		Single deck	Mercedes-Benz	1983		Brazil
O 404		Single deck	Mercedes-Benz	1992 to 1999		Germany
O 405		Single deck	Mercedes-Benz	1983 to 2001		Germany
O 3500		Single deck	Mercedes-Benz	1949 to 1955		Germany
OB		Single deck	Bedford Vehicles	1939 to 1951		United Kingdom
OC 500LE		Single deck	Mercedes-Benz			
Odra A81		Single deck	Jelcz	1957	Prototype	Poland
Old Look		Single deck	Yellow Coach (1940-1944); General Motors Truck & Coach (1944-1959)	1940 to 1969		USA
Olympian (Leyland-MCW)		Single deck	Leyland Motors; Metro Cammell Weymann	1954 to 1958		United Kingdom
Olympian (Leyland)		Double deck	Leyland Motors	1980 to 1993		United Kingdom
Olympian (Volvo)		Double deck	Volvo Buses	1992 to 2000		Sweden
Olympic		Single deck	Leyland Motors; Metro Cammell Weymann	1949 to 1971		United Kingdom
Olympus		Double deck	East Lancashire Coachbuilders; Optare	2006 to 2011	Bodywork, originally launched as East Lancs Olympus	United Kingdom
Omicron		Single deck	Lancia	1927 to 1936		Italy
Omnibus		Single deck	Benz & Cie.	1895		Germany
OmniCity		Single/double deck	Scania	1996 to 2012		Sweden
OmniDekka		Double deck	East Lancashire Coachbuilders; Optare	2003 to 2011	Bodywork for Scania N94UD/NUD chassis	United Kingdom
OmniExpress		Single deck	Scania	2007 to 2017		Sweden
OmniLine		Single deck	Scania	2000 to 2009		Sweden
OmniLink		Single deck	Scania	1998 to 2013		Sweden
OmniTown		Single deck	Scania; East Lancashire Coachbuilders	2002 to 2007	Scania N94UB with East Lancashire Coachbuilders bodywork	United Kingdom
OP5		Single deck	Somua	1950 to 1974		France
Opalin		Single deck	TEMSA	2003		Turkey
Optare 700 SE		Single deck	NABI	2000s		USA
Optima		Trolleybus	Trolza	2003 to 2019		Russia
Optimus		Single/double deck	Volgren	2013 to present	Bodywork	Australia
Opus		Single deck	Optima Bus			USA
Opus 2		Single deck	East Lancashire Coachbuilders	1996	Bodywork	United Kingdom
Orana		Single deck	Ansair (1993 to 1997); Phoenix Bus (1997 to 1998)	1993 to 1998	Bodywork	Australia
Oréos 2X		Single deck	Gepebus	2017	Minibus	France
Oréos 4X		Single deck	Gepebus		Minibus	France
Orion		Minibus	Bluebird Vehicles; Mellor Coachcraft	2011 to present	Bodywork for Fiat Ducato	United Kingdom
Orion I		Single deck	Orion Bus Industries (or, before 1995, Ontario Bus Industries)	1977 to 1993		Canada
Orion II		Single deck	Orion Bus Industries (or, before 1995, Ontario Bus Industries)	1983 to 2003	Minibus	Canada
Orion III-Ikarus 286		Single deck	Orion Bus Industries (or, before 1995, Ontario Bus Industries)	1986 to 1989	Articulated	Canada
Orion IV		Single deck	Orion Bus Industries (or, before 1995, Ontario Bus Industries)	1985 to 1989	Used in Niagara Falls, Ontario aka Orion-PeopleMover	Canada
Orion V		Single deck	Orion Bus Industries (or, before 1995, Ontario Bus Industries)	1989 to 2009		Canada
Orion VI		Single deck	Orion Bus Industries (or, before 1995, Ontario Bus Industries)	1995 to 2004		Canada
Orion VII OG		Single deck	Orion Bus Industries	2002 to 2007	First generation	Canada
Orion VII NG		Single deck	Orion Bus Industries	2007 to 2010		Canada
Orion VII 3G EPA10		Single deck	Orion Bus Industries	2010 to 2012	Production ceased after Orion folded in 2012	Canada
Orione		Single deck	Officine Meccaniche	1956 to 1959		Italy
Ormen Lange		Single deck	Høka	1940	Articulated	Norway

== P ==
List of buses: P
Name	Image	Type	Manufacturer	Year	Notes	Country
P-01		Single deck	Jelcz	1950s to 1960s	Trailer bus	Poland
P45-37		Single deck	Aerocoach			United States
Paladin		Single deck	Northern Counties		Bodywork	
Palatine		Double deck	Northern Counties		Bodywork	
Panaire		Single deck			Open-top bodywork. As of June 2008 no orders have been placed, and none have been built.	
Panorama		Double deck	Plaxton	2018		United Kingdom
Panorama Elite		Single deck	Plaxton	1968 to 1975	Bodywork	
Panther Cub		Single deck	Leyland Motors	1964		
Panther		Single deck	Leyland Motors	1964		
Panther		Single deck	Plaxton	1999		United Kingdom
Paragon		Single deck	Plaxton	1999	Bodywork	
Paramount		Single/double deck	Plaxton	1982 to 1991	Bodywork	
Pathfinder		Single deck	Wrightbus	1993	Bodywork	
Patriot		Single deck	Ward Body Works	1985 to 1991	School bus	USA
PB		Coach				
PCM		Single deck or double deck	Berliet	1965 to 1971		France
PD-4501 Scenicruiser		Two-level coach	General Motors Truck & Coach	1954 to 1956		
Pennine 7		Single deck	Seddon Atkinson	1974 to 1982		United Kingdom
Pennine RU		Single deck	Seddon Atkinson	1969 to 1974		United Kingdom
PH		Single deck	Berliet	1959 to 1974		France
Phantom		School bus	Gillig Corporation	1986 to 1993		
Phantom		Single deck	Gillig Corporation	1982 to 2008		
Phoenix Low Floor		Single deck	Denning Manufacturing	2004 to 2024	Integral	Australia
Pilot		Minibus	LDV Group	1996 to 2006		United Kingdom
Pioneer		Single deck	Merkavim			Israel
PLR		Single deck	Berliet	1953 to 1963		France
Pointer/Pointer 2		Single deck	Reeve Burgess; Plaxton; TransBus; Alexander Dennis		Bodywork	United Kingdom
Pollicino		Single deck	Iveco	1988 to 2000	Minibus	Italy
Poncho		Single deck	Hino Motors	2002 to present		Japan
PR 14		Single deck	Berliet (1976-1979); Renault Bus (1979-1989)	1976 to 1989		France
PR100		Single deck	Berliet; Renault Bus	1971 to 1999		France
PR100		Single deck	Jelcz on licence Berliet	1972 to 1974		Poland
PR100.3		Single deck	Renault Bus		Based on the Renault R312	France
PR110		Single deck	Jelcz	1975 to 1992		Poland
PR110D		Single deck	Jelcz	1984 to 1992		Poland
PR110E		Single deck	Jelcz	1980 to 1992	Trolleybus	Poland
PR180.2		Single deck	Renault		Articulated	France
Premiere		Single deck	Plaxton	1991	Bodywork	United Kingdom
Premier		Single deck	Jonckheere	1996 to 2000		Belgium
President		Single deck	Ward Body Works	1973 to 1989	School bus	USA
President		Double deck	Plaxton	1999 to 2005	Bodywork	United Kingdom
Prestige		Single deck	Northern Counties; Plaxton		Bodywork	United Kingdom
Prestij		Single deck	TEMSA	1997		Turkey
Primas Limousine LI.33B		Single deck	Samco			Vietnam
Primo		Minibus	Plaxton	2005 to 2010	Built on the structure of Enterprise Bus' Plasma	United Kingdom
Prisma		Single deck	Optare	1995	Bodywork	United Kingdom
Procity		Single deck	BMC	2008 to present		Turkey
Profile		Single deck	Plaxton	2002 to 2012	Bodywork	United Kingdom
Pronto		Single deck	Plaxton		Bodywork	United Kingdom
Proway		Single deck	Irisbus	2005 to 2013	Minibus	Italy
Proxys		Single deck	Irisbus	2005 to 2013	Minibus	Turkey
PS type		Single deck	Walter Alexander Coachbuilders	1988 to 1998	Bodywork	United Kingdom
Pulsar		Single deck	Wrightbus	2006 to 2014	Bodywork for VDL SB200	United Kingdom
Pulsar Gemini		Double deck	Wrightbus	2003 to 2006	Bodywork built for DAF/VDL DB250	United Kingdom
Pulsar Gemini HEV		Double deck	Wrightbus	2006	Hybrid-electric	United Kingdom
Pyoneer		Double deck	East Lancashire Coachbuilders		Bodywork	United Kingdom

== Q ==
List of buses: Q
Name	Image	Type	Manufacturer	Year	Notes	Country
Q-type		Single/double deck	Associated Equipment Company	1932		United Kingdom

== R ==
List of buses: R
Name	Image	Type	Manufacturer	Year	Notes	Country
R312		Single deck	Renault Bus	1987 to 1995		France
R4000-Series		Single deck	Renault Bus	1949 to 1957		France
RC2		Single deck	MAN Truck & Bus	2014 - present		Germany
R-Series		Single Deck	Dennis; TransBus			United Kingdom
R-Series		Single deck	Ford			United Kingdom
Rainbow		Single deck	Hino Motors	1980 to present		Japan
Rapta		Double deck	Optare	2008	Never entered production	
RB		Single deck	Hyundai Motor Company			South Korea
RE		Single deck	Bristol Commercial Vehicles	1962		United Kingdom
Récréo		Single deck	Karosa; Renault			Czech Republic
Récréo		Single deck	Irisbus			Czech Republic
Regal I		Single deck	Associated Equipment Company	1946 to 1947		United Kingdom
Regal II		Single deck	Associated Equipment Company	1935 to 1939		United Kingdom
Regal IV		Single deck	Associated Equipment Company	1949 to 1962		United Kingdom
Regal VI		Single deck	Associated Equipment Company	1960 (circa)		United Kingdom
Regent II		Double deck	Associated Equipment Company			United Kingdom
Regent III		Double deck	Associated Equipment Company	1947 to 1956		United Kingdom
Regent III RT		Double deck	Associated Equipment Company	1950 (circa)		United Kingdom
Regent V		Double deck	Associated Equipment Company	1954		United Kingdom
Reliance		Single deck bus/coach	Associated Equipment Company	1953		United Kingdom
Renown (AEC)		Double deck	Associated Equipment Company	1962 to 1967		United Kingdom
Renown (Wright)		Single deck	Wrightbus	1997 to 2002	Bodywork for Volvo B10BLE	United Kingdom
RH 525-23		Single deck	Saurer	1978		Switzerland
RN		Single deck	Praga			Czech Republic
RN		Single deck	Nissan Diesel	1996 to 2003	Minibus	Japan
Ro		Single deck	Lancia	1952 to 1955		Italy
Roadliner		Single deck	Daimler	1962 to 1972		United Kingdom
Rosa		Minibus	Mitsubishi Fuso Truck & Bus Corporation	1960 to present		Japan
Routemaster		Double deck	Associated Equipment Company	1954		United Kingdom
Royal Tiger Worldmaster		Single deck	Leyland Motors			United Kingdom
Royal Tiger (B50)		Single deck	Leyland Motors	1982		United Kingdom
RT-52		Single deck	Chance Coach			
RTS		Single deck	General Motors Truck & Coach (1977–1987); Motor Coach Industries (1987–1995); Nova Bus (1995–2003); Millennium Transit Services (2006–2009)	1977 to 2009		Canada (Nova Bus/MCI) USA (General Motors)

== S ==
List of buses: S
Name	Image	Type	Manufacturer	Year	Notes	Country
S2 RU II		Single deck	Fritz Fleischer (Unternehmen)	1968		Germany
S 200		Single deck	Škoda-Sanos	1982 to 1987	Articulated trolleybus	Czech Republic
S 215 SL		Single deck	Setra	1983		Germany
S 300		Single deck	Setra	1991		Germany
S 400		Single deck	Setra	2001		Germany
S-Series		School bus	International Harvester (1979-1986); Navistar International (1986-1989)	1978 to 1989	Also marketed as the "Schoolmaster".	
S-Series		Single deck	SAVIEM (1964-1979); Renault (1979-1993)	1964 to 1993		France
S-type		Double deck	AEC	1920 to 1927		United Kingdom
S'elega		Single deck	Hino Motors	1990		Japan
Sabre		Single deck	Associated Equipment Company	1968		United Kingdom
Saf-T-Liner		School bus	Thomas Built Buses	1978		USA
Saf-T-Liner C2		School bus	Thomas Built Buses	2004		USA
Saf-T-Liner EF		Single deck	Thomas Built Buses	1978	School bus	United States
Saf-T-Liner EFX		Single deck	Thomas Built Buses	2011	School bus	United States
Saf-T-Liner ER		Single deck	Thomas Built Buses	1978	School bus	United States
Saf-T-Liner FS-65		Single deck	Thomas Built Buses	1995 to 2007	School bus	United States
Saf-T-Liner HDX		Single deck	Thomas Built Buses	2001	School bus	United States
Saf-T-Liner MVP		Single deck	Thomas Built Buses	1991	School bus	United States
Safari		Single deck	TEMSA	2000		Turkey
Safari HD		Single deck	TEMSA	2006		Turkey
Safari RD		Single deck	TEMSA	2010		Turkey
Safetran		Single deck	U.S. Bus	2000s	School bus	USA
Safir		Single deck	TEMSA	1999		Turkey
Safir		Single deck	SNVI	2001		Algeria
Sancity 10LF		Single deck	Autosan	2012		Poland
Sancity 12Lx		Single deck	Autosan	2011		Poland
Sancity 18LF		Single deck	Autosan	2012		Poland
SAZ LE-60		Single deck	SamKochAvto	1999		Uzbekistan
SB		Single deck	Bedford Vehicles			United Kingdom
SB50		Single deck	Custom Bus		Bodywork	Australia
SB120		Single deck	DAF Bus/VDL Bus		Originally launched as the DAF SB120	Netherlands
SB200		Single deck	DAF Bus/VDL Bus		Originally launched as the DAF SB200	Netherlands
SB220		Single deck	DAF Bus/VDL Bus			Netherlands
SB250		Single deck	DAF Bus/VDL Bus		Originally launched as the DAF SB250	Netherlands
SB400		Single deck	Custom Bus		Bodywork	Australia
SC		Single deck	Bristol Commercial Vehicles	1954		United Kingdom
SC 10		Single deck	SAVIEM	1965 to 1989		France
SC4		Single deck	Société des usines Chausson	1963		France
SC222		Single deck	Volgren		Bodywork	Australia
SD 202		Single deck	MAN Truck & Bus	1986 to 1992		Germany
SDi		Single deck	Bustech		Bodywork	Australia
Senator		Single deck	Ward Body Works	1990 to 1992		USA
SFA-2		Single deck	SFA	1962		Poland
SFA-4 Alfa		Single deck	SFA	1964		Poland
SG 220		Single deck	MAN		Articulated	
SG 240 H		Single deck	MAN Truck & Bus	1980 to 1986	Articulated	Germany
SG 242		Single deck	MAN Truck & Bus	1986 to 1999	Articulated	Germany
SG 242 H		Single deck	MAN Truck & Bus	1985 to 1990	Articulated	Germany
Sigma (Mellor)		Single deck	Mellor Coachcraft	2021 to present		United Kingdom
Sigma (Optare)		Single deck	Optare	1994 to 1996	Bodywork	United Kingdom
Sirius		Single deck	NABI	2013		USA
Skyliner		Double deck	Neoplan	1967 to present		Germany
SL 200		Single deck	MAN Truck & Bus	1973 to 1988		Germany
SL 202		Single deck	MAN Truck & Bus	1984 to 1993		Germany
SLF		Single deck	UD Trucks	2014		India
SLF200		Single deck	Daimler Buses North America	to 2005		USA
SM 152		Single deck	MAN Truck & Bus	1989 to 1992		Germany
Solar Fusion		Single deck	Wrightbus		Articulated bodywork for Scania L94UA	
Solar		Single deck	Wrightbus	2000 to 2011	Bodywork for Scania L94UB	
Solcity 11M		Single deck	Solbus	2006		Poland
Solcity 12 LNG		Single deck	Solbus	2012		
Solcity 18		Single deck	Solbus	2009	Articulated	Poland
Solera		Single deck	Ferqui; Optare	1997 to 2008		
Solo		Single deck	Optare; Switch Mobility	1998 to 2025		
Soltour ST10		Single deck	Solbus	2007		Poland
Soltour ST11		Single deck	Solbus	2006		Poland
Solway SL10		Single deck	Solbus	2007		Poland
Solway SL11		Single deck	Solbus	2007		Poland
Soroco		Minibus	Optare			
Space Arrow		Single deck	Nissan Diesel	1985		Japan
Space Dream		Double deck	Nissan Diesel	1983		Japan
Space Runner 7		Single deck	Nissan Diesel	1994		Japan
Space Runner A		Single deck	Nissan Diesel	2007		Japan
Space Runner JP		Single deck	Nissan Diesel	1994		Japan
Space Runner RA		Single deck	Nissan Diesel	2005		Japan
Space Runner RM		Single deck	Nissan Diesel	1975		Japan
Space Runner RP		Single deck	Nissan Diesel	1986		Japan
Spectra		Double deck	Optare	1991 to 2005	Bodywork for DAF/VDL DB250	
Sprinter City		Minibus	Mercedes-Benz Buses	1995 to present		
Sprinter City		Minibus	Freightliner Trucks	1995 to present		
Sprinter Mobility		Minibus	Mercedes-Benz Buses	1995 to present		
Sprinter Transfer		Minibus	Mercedes-Benz Buses	1995 to present		
Spryte		Single deck	East Lancashire Coachbuilders		Bodywork	United Kingdom
SRM		Double deck	Wrightbus	2016	New Routemaster-style bodywork for Volvo B5LH	United Kingdom
SR3 Panorama		Single deck	Laksana	2022 to present	Bodywork for Scania K360iB	Indonesia
SST		Single deck	Trans Tech	2012 to present	School bus	USA
ST Aero		Single deck	Trans Tech	2012 to present	School bus	USA
Starbus		Single deck	Tata Motors	2006		India
Starliner			Neoplan	1996 to 2015		Germany
StarRider		Minibus	Optare	1987 to 1994	Bodywork	United Kingdom
Strata		Minibus	Mellor Coachcraft	2016 to present	Bodywork for Mercedes-Benz Sprinter Transfer	United Kingdom
Stratos		Minibus	SKD Trade	2011		Czech Republic
StreetAir		Single deck	Wrightbus	2017	Battery-electric	United Kingdom
StreetCar		Single deck	Wrightbus	2006-2009	Bodywork for Volvo B7LA and Hess chassis, for bus rapid transit	United Kingdom
StreetDeck		Double deck	Wrightbus	2014-present		United Kingdom
StreetLite		Single deck	Wrightbus	2010-2024		United Kingdom
Streetway		Single deck	Iveco Bus	2021 to present		Czech Republic
Strider		Single deck	Walter Alexander Coachbuilders	1993	Bodywork	United Kingdom
Sturdibus		Single deck	U.S. Bus	2000s	School bus	USA
Sturdibus HD		Single deck	U.S. Bus	2000s	School bus	USA
Sturdivan		Single deck	U.S. Bus	2000s	School bus	USA
SU		Single deck	Bristol Commercial Vehicles	1960-1966		United Kingdom
Super Bantam		Single deck	Collins Bus	1992 to 2011		USA
Super Cruiser		Single deck	Isuzu	1986 to 1996		Japan
Super Olympian		Double deck	Volvo Buses	1998		United Kingdom; Poland
Super Orione		Single deck	Officine Meccaniche	1956 to 1959		Italy
Supercoach		Single deck	Crown Coach Corporation	1948 to 1991	School bus	United States
Supreme		Single deck	Plaxton	1974	Bodywork	United Kingdom
SW		Single deck	Somua		Trolleybus	France
Swift (AEC)		Single deck	Associated Equipment Company	1964		United Kingdom
Swift (Leyland)		Single deck	Leyland Motors	1987		United Kingdom
SwissHybrid		Single deck	Hess	2010	Articulated	Switzerland
Swisstrolley		Single deck	Hess	1991	Articulated trolleybus	Switzerland
Swisstrolley 2		Single deck	Hess	1996 to 2000	Articulated trolleybus	Switzerland
Swisstrolley 3		Single deck	Hess	2004 to 2014	Articulated trolleybus	Switzerland
Swisstrolley 4		Single deck	Hess	2012 to 2017	Articulated trolleybus	Switzerland
Swisstrolley 5		Single deck	Hess	2017 to present	Articulated trolleybus	Switzerland

== T ==
List of buses: T
Name	Image	Type	Manufacturer	Year	Notes	Country
T 11		Single deck	Škoda	1964 to 1967	Trolleybus	Czech Republic
T-32		Single deck	Yellow Coach	1940 to 1942		United States
T-type		Double deck	Associated Equipment Company	1920		United Kingdom
T1		Single deck	Yuzhmash	1992 to 1998	Articulated trolleybus	Ukraine
T2		Minibus	Mercedes-Benz			Germany
T2		Single deck	Yuzhmash	1993 to 2008	Trolleybus	Ukraine
T2.09		Single deck	Yuzhmash	1998 to 2007	Trolleybus	Ukraine
T44		Single deck	CCF-Brill	1946 to 1954	Trolleybus	Canada
T48A		Single deck	CCF-Brill	1949 to 1954	Trolleybus	Canada
T103		Single deck	Yuzhmash	2013	Trolleybus	Ukraine
T120		Single deck	Jelcz	1992 to 2004		Poland
T120/3		Single deck	Jelcz	1999 to 2004		Poland
T203		Single deck	Yuzhmash	2013	Trolleybus	Ukraine
Tango		Single deck	Carrozzeria Autodromo Modena	2001 to 2003		Italy
TC44		Single deck	ACF-Brill		Trolleybus	United States
TC/2000		School bus	Blue Bird Corporation	1988 to 2003		United States
TCI 840 GT		Single deck	Cacciamali	2003 to 2010	Minibus	Italy
TCM 890		Single deck	Cacciamali	1995 to 1998		Italy
TDH-4801; TDM-4801		Single deck	General Motors Truck & Coach	1953 to 1958	Special version of the GM "old-look" transit bus for California	United States
TDU 850		Single deck	Car et Bus Le Mans (CBM)	1981 to 1989		France
Tempo		Single deck	Optare	2004		United Kingdom
Terra Bus		Single deck	Foremost		Off-road vehicle	
Territo U		Single deck	Otokar	2016 to present		Turkey
Thesi		Single deck	Cacciamali	1992 to 2017	Minibus	Italy
Tiger (front-engined)		Single deck	Leyland Motors	1927 to 1968		United Kingdom
Tiger (mid-engined)		Single deck	Leyland Motors	1979		United Kingdom
Tiger Cub		Single deck	Leyland Motors	1951		United Kingdom
Titan (B15)		Double deck	Leyland Motors	1977 to 1984		United Kingdom
Titan (front-engined)		Double deck	Leyland Motors	1927 to 1942; 1945 to 1970		United Kingdom
Titanium		Single deck	Nogebus		Chassis: MAN 18.440	
TL960		Single deck	Thomas	1990s		United States
TN		Minibus	Mercedes-Benz			Germany
TN		Single deck	Renault	1932 to 1940		France
TN 12		Single deck	SOR Libchavy		Trolleybus	Czech Republic
TNB 12		Single deck	SOR Libchavy		Trolleybus	Czech Republic
TNB 18		Single deck	SOR Libchavy		Articulated trolleybus	Czech Republic
TopClass 500		Single / double deck	Setra			Germany
Toro		Single deck	Optare			
TOT		Single deck	Praga	1936 to 1939	Trolleybus	Czech Republic
Touring HD		Single deck	Scania	2014 to present	Produced in China by Higer Bus	
Tourismo		Single-deck coach	Mercedes-Benz			Germany
Tourliner		Single deck	Neoplan	2003 to present		Germany
Tourmalin		Single deck	TEMSA	2006		Turkey
Tourneo		Minibus	Ford	1965		
Tracer		Single deck		1991 to 2001		France
Trans Star		Single deck	Trans Tech	2012 to present	School bus	United States
Transit		Single deck	Collins Bus	2012	School bus	United States
Transit		Minibus	Ford	1965	Numerous Ford Transit minivans and minibuses were produced. This image shows the London Transport bus FS19 (image taken 1978).	
Transit		Single deck	Jonckheere	1993 to 2000		Belgium
Transit Bus		Single-deck	Ford	1936 to 1947		
Transit Coach School Bus		School bus	Gillig Brothers (1940-1969); Gillig Corporation (1969-1982)	1940 to 1982		
Transliner		Single deck	Neoplan			
Transtar		Single deck				
Travego		Single deck	Mercedes-Benz	1999 to 2017		Germany
Trident 2		Double deck	Dennis / TransBus / Alexander Dennis	1997		United Kingdom
Trident 3		Double deck	Dennis/TransBus International	1996		United Kingdom
Trollino		Single deck	Solaris	2002 to present	Trolleybus	Poland
TT		Single deck	Wrightbus	1985	Bodywork	United Kingdom
Turbocity		Single/double deck	Iveco	1989 to 1996	Iveco 480 (urban); IVECO 580 (suburban); IVECO 680 (interurban); Double-decker bus with Alexander bodies at Blythswood Vehicles' Glasgow	Italy
Turbocity R		Single/double deck	Iveco	1992 to 1998	IVECO 490 (urban); IVECO 590 (suburban & interurban)	Italy
Turquoise		Minibus	Isuzu	2012 to present		Japan
Type AI		Single deck	De Dion-Bouton	1905		France

== U ==
List of buses: U
Name	Image	Type	Manufacturer	Year	Notes	Country
U-R		Single deck	Nissan Motors	1959		Japan
U55 Currus Cityrama		Double deck	Citroën	1956 to 1959		France
U11DD		Double deck	Yutong	2023 to present	Electric bus	China
U150		Single deck	Inbus since 1987 Bredabus	1979 to 1993		Italy
U210		Single deck	Inbus since 1987 Bredabus	1979 to 1993		Italy
U31RCN		Single deck	Nissan Diesel	1989 to 1993		Japan
U312		Single deck	Rocar	1993-1999	Also built as a trolleybus under the 312E name	Romania
U412		Single deck	Rocar	1994 to 2002		Romania
U412-DAF		Single deck	Rocar			Romania
U412E		Single deck	Rocar	1997 to 2002	Trolleybus	Romania
U812		Single deck	Rocar	1998	Also built as a trolleybus under the E812 name, both vehicles were prototypes.	Romania
UA		Single deck	Nissan Diesel	1973 to 2005		Japan
Ultra		Single deck	Walter Alexander Coachbuilders	1994 to 1998	Bodywork	United Kingdom
Universe		Single deck	Hyundai Motor Company			South Korea
Universe		Single deck	U.S. Bus	2000s	School bus	USA
Urbanit		Double deck	Ha'argaz			Israel
Urbanway 10		Single deck	Iveco Bus	2013 to present	Diesel / CNG / hybrid	France; Czech Republic
Urbanway 12		Single deck	Iveco Bus	2013 to present	Diesel / CNG / hybrid	France; Czech Republic
Urbanway 18		Single deck	Iveco Bus	2013 to present	Articulated; Diesel / CNG / hybrid	France; Czech Republic
Urbino IV		Single deck	Solaris	2015		Poland
Urbino 8,9 LE		Single deck	Solaris	2008 to present	Diesel/Electric	Poland
Urbino 9		Single deck	Solaris	2000 to 2002		Poland
Urbino 10		Single deck	Solaris	2002 to 2018		Poland
Urbino 10,5		Single deck	Solaris	2017 to present		Poland
Urbino 12		Single deck	Solaris	1999 to present	Diesel / electric / CNG / hydrogen / hybrid	Poland
Urbino 12 LE		Single deck	Solaris	2004 to present	Diesel / CNG / hybrid	Poland
Urbino 15		Single deck	Solaris	1999 to 2018		Poland
Urbino 15 LE		Single deck	Solaris	2008 to 2018		Poland
Urbino 18		Single deck	Solaris	1999 to present	Articulated; Diesel / electric / hybrid / CNG	Poland
Urby		Minibus	Cacciamali	2005 to 2017		Italy

== V ==
List of buses: V
Name	Image	Type	Manufacturer	Year	Notes	Country
V187		Single deck	Ikarus	2010 to 2021	Articulated	Hungary
Vacanza 12		Single deck	Solaris	2002 to 2010		Poland
Vacanza 13		Single deck	Solaris	2004 to 2010		Poland
VAL		Single deck	Bedford Vehicles			United Kingdom
Valiant		Double deck	Albion	1931 to 1936		United Kingdom
Valkyrie		Single deck	Albion	1930 to 1938	Coach	United Kingdom
Valletta		Single deck	Solaris	2002 to 2003; 2007		Poland
VAM		Single deck	Bedford Vehicles			United Kingdom
Vanguard		Single deck	Ward Body Works	1985 to 1992	School bus	USA
Vario		Minibus	Mercedes-Benz	1996 to 2013		Germany
VAS		Single deck	Bedford Vehicles	1961 to 1985	Minicoach	United Kingdom
VBF		Single deck	Vétra	1957	Trolleybus	France
VBH 85		Single deck	Vétra - Berliet		Trolleybus	France
VBR		Single deck	Vétra		Trolleybus	France
Vecta		Single deck	Optare	1991 to 1997	Bodywork for MAN 11.180/11.190	United Kingdom
Vectio		Single deck	Otokar	2007		Turkey
Vector		Single deck	PAZ	2012	Midibus	Russia
Venture		Minibus	Tata Motors	2011 to present		India
Venturer		Double deck	Albion	1932 to 1939		United Kingdom
Verde		Single deck	Plaxton	1991 to 1997	Bodywork	United Kingdom
Versa		Single deck	Optare	2007 to present		United Kingdom
Victor		Single deck	Albion	1947 to 1966		United Kingdom
Victory Mark 2		Double deck	Leyland Motors	1978 to 1981		United Kingdom
Viedo		Single deck	Optare			United Kingdom
Viking		Single deck	Ashok Leyland	1976 to present		India
Viking		Single deck	Albion	1963 to 1980		United Kingdom
VinBus		Single deck	VinFast		Electric bus	Vietnam
Vision		School bus	Blue Bird Corporation	2003		USA
Visionaire		Double deck	East Lancashire Coachbuilders; Optare	2006	Open-top bodywork, originally launched as East Lancs Visionaire	United Kingdom
Vista		School bus	Thomas Built Buses	1989 to 1998		USA
VistaLiner		Single deck	Flxible	1955		USA
Vito		Minibus	Mercedes-Benz	1996 to present		Germany
Vivacity		Single deck	BredaMenarinibus	2005 to 2015		Italy
Vixen		Single deck	Guy Motors	1953		United Kingdom
Volksbus 17-240 OT		Single deck	Volkswagen Caminhões e Ônibus	1993 to present		Brazil
Volksbus 18-280 OT		Single deck	Volkswagen Caminhões e Ônibus	2014 to present		Brazil
Volunteer		Single deck	Ward Body Works	1973 to 1992	School bus	USA
VR		Double deck	Bristol Commercial Vehicles	1966		United Kingdom
VST		Single deck	Bustech		Bodywork	Australia
Vyking		Double deck	East Lancashire Coachbuilders		Bodywork for Volvo B7TL	United Kingdom

== W ==
List of buses: W
Name	Image	Type	Manufacturer	Year	Notes	Country
W500		Single deck	LOWA	1951 to 1953	Trolley bus	East Germany
Westcoast-ER		Single deck	Thomas Built Buses	1991 to 2000	School bus	United States
Western Flyer		Single deck	Western Flyer Coach	1937		Canada
Wetlina		Single deck	Autosan	2008 to 2013	Minibus	Poland
WHB		Single deck	Bedford Vehicles	1929 to 1935		United Kingdom
Wolf		Single deck	Guy Motors	1934	Midibus	United Kingdom
Wulfrunian		Double deck	Guy Motors	1959 to 1965		United Kingdom

== X ==
List of buses: X
Name	Image	Type	Manufacturer	Year	Notes	Country
X3-45		Coach	Prevost			Canada, United States
X-type		Double deck	London General Omnibus Company	1909		United Kingdom
Xcelsior		Single deck	New Flyer Industries	2008 to present	Articulated 60 feet or standard 40 feet	Canada
XDi		Single deck	Bustech			Australia
XHF		Single deck	ElDorado National–California			USA

== Y ==
List of buses: Y
Name	Image	Type	Manufacturer	Year	Notes	Country
Y series		Single deck	Bedford Vehicles	1970 to 1986		United Kingdom
Y Type		Single deck	Walter Alexander Coachbuilders	1962 to 1983	Bodywork	United Kingdom

== Z ==
List of buses: Z
Name	Image	Type	Manufacturer	Year	Notes	Country
Z-250		Single deck	Yellow Coach	1930s		USA
Z-403 Monocasco		Two-level	Pegaso	1951 to 1953	Monocoque	Spain
Z10		Single deck	Floirat	1954 to 1959		France
Zawrat		Single deck	PZInż	1936 to 1937		Poland
Zeus		Minibus	BredaMenarinibus; Industria Italiana Autobus (IIA)	2000 to 2015	Electric	Italy
ZEUS		Single deck	Phoenix Motorcars	2013	Zero emission utility shuttle	USA
ZiU-5		Single deck	Trolza	1959 to 1972	Trolleybus	Russia
ZiU-9		Single deck	Trolza	1971 to 2013	Trolleybus	Russia
ZiU-10		Single deck	Trolza	1986 to 2008	Articulated trolleybus	Russia
ZK6118HG		Single deck	Yutong		Based on the MAN Lion's City	China
ZK6126HG		Single/double deck	Yutong		Based on the MAN Lion's City	China
ZX5		Single deck	Proterra	2020 to present		United States

== Š ==
List of buses: Š
Name	Image	Type	Manufacturer	Year	Notes	Country
ŠM 11		Single deck	Škoda; Karosa	1965 to 1981		Czech Republic
ŠM 16,5		Single deck	Škoda; Karosa	1968	Articulated	Czech Republic
ŠL 11		Single deck	Škoda; Karosa	1970 to 1981		Czech Republic
ŠD 11		Single deck	Škoda; Karosa	1963 to 1981		Czech Republic

== See also ==
- Bus spotting
- Coach (used for long-distance travel)
- Dollar van
- List of fictional buses
- List of Leyland buses
- List of bus operating companies
- List of AEC buses
- Trackless train
- Tram
- Single-deck bus
