= AmphiCoach GTS-1 =

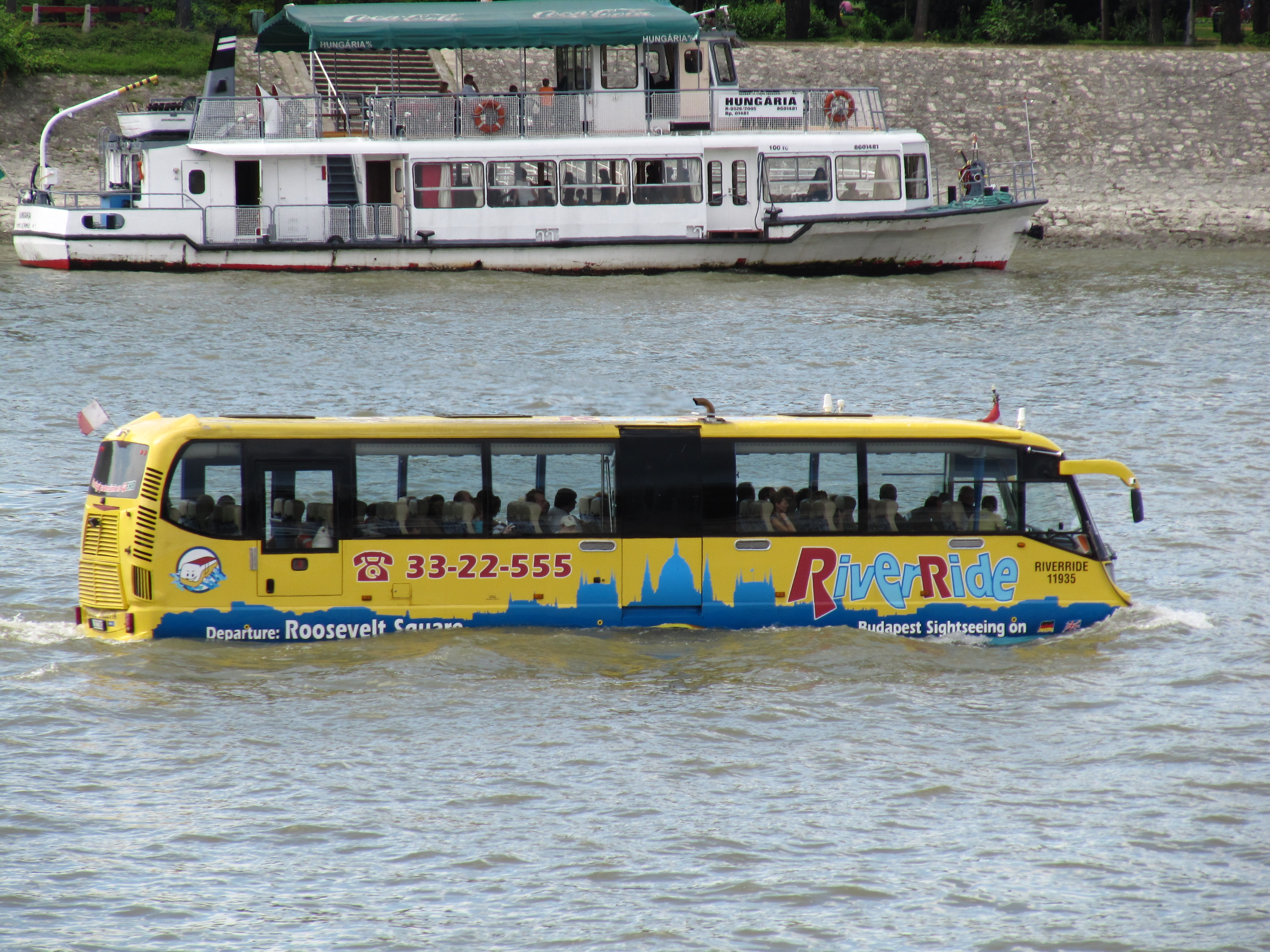

Overview
- Manufacturer: GS Specialist Vehicles
- Also called: Waterbus
- Production: 2006-present
- Assembly: Malta
- Designer: Independent

Body and chassis
- Class: Amphibious motorcoach
- Platform: Iveco Bus

Powertrain
- Engine: Iveco Tector Common Rail Turbo Diesels Intercooler 2/4 WD
- Transmission: Automatic and manual

Dimensions
- Length: 12 metres (39 ft)
- Width: 2.5 metres (8 ft 2 in)

The AmphiCoach GTS-1 is an amphibious passenger coach designed by a team that were essentially funded by Scotsman George Smith and built in Malta. The prototype was tested at Marsaxlokk Bay, Malta. The prototype was hand-built on the island over a three-year period 2004–2007 with a considerable contribution from former Malta Drydocks workers whose skill Smith described as "invaluable".

The price of the AmphiCoach GTS-1 is set to around £280,000. To date there is one vehicle in service, in Budapest, Hungary. A second vehicle was delivered to Belfast. The Amphicoach GTS-1 has full E.U. certification.

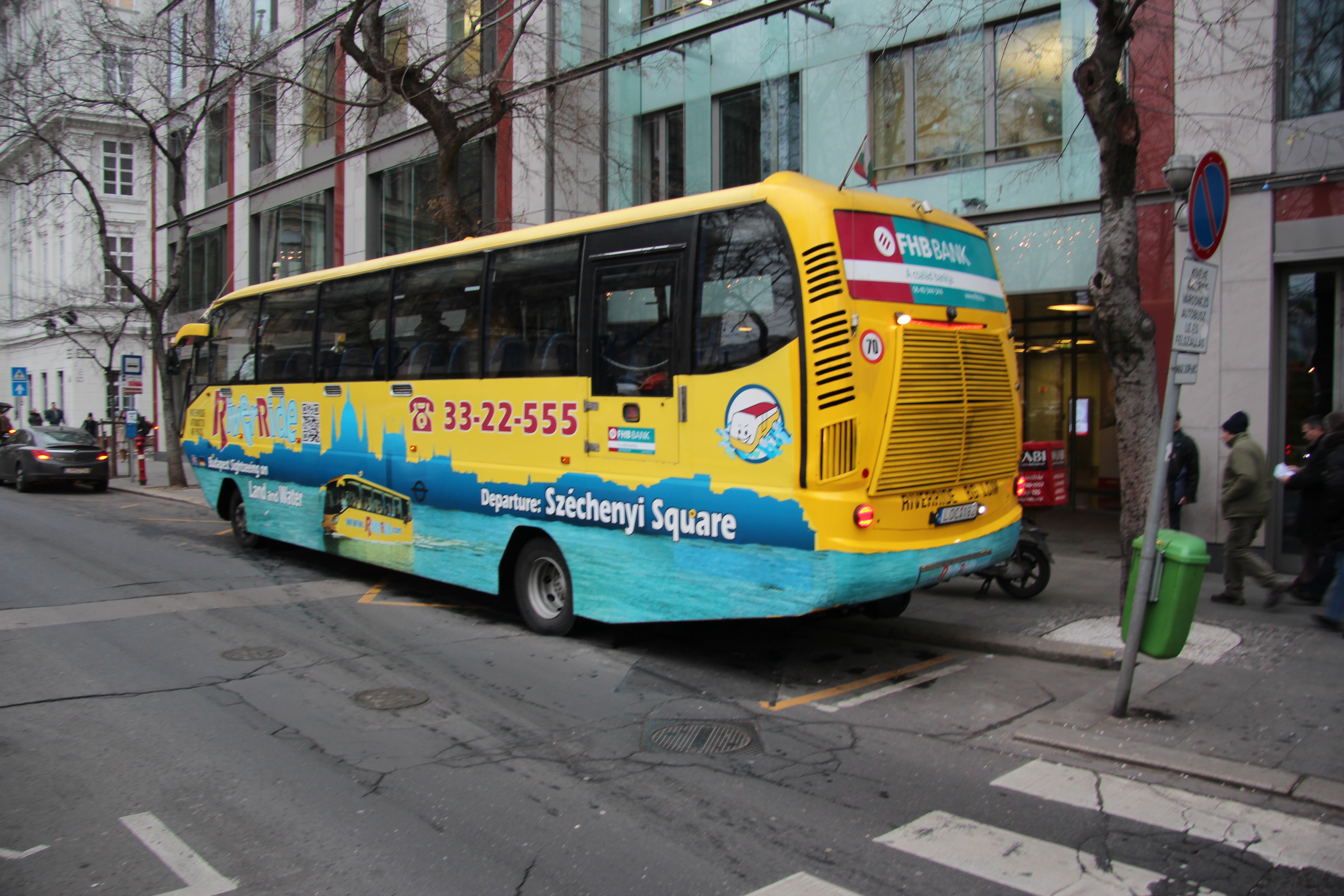
Boatbus Budapest rear

== See also ==
- List of buses
