= Tata Globus =

Overview
- Manufacturer: Tata Motors
- Assembly: ACGL, Goa

Body and chassis
- Class: bus

Powertrain
- Engine: various options

Tata Globus was a range of fully built buses manufactured by Tata Motors. The Tata Globus Range was available in 13, 18, 20 and 45 seater configurations. The body was built by ACGL, Goa.

== Variants ==
- Globus 13 - Chassis Platform - LP 410/31
- Globus 18 - Chassis Platform - LP 709/38
- Globus 20 - Chassis Platform - LPO 918/42
- Globus 45 - Chassis Platform - LPO 1616/62
- Globus CNG Hybrid

=== Hispano Globus ===
Tata Hispano Globus

Body and chassis
- Class: Commercial vehicle
- Body style: Single-deck coach
- Related: Volvo 9400; Ashok Leyland Luxura; Cerita JC 12 HD; SML Isuzu Prestige; Mercedes-Benz O500 R 1830

Powertrain
- Engine: 235 HP 5.9litres 6BT Cummins diesel rear engine BS2
- Transmission: 6-speed manual

Dimensions
- Wheelbase: 6,095 mm (240.0 in)
- Length: 11,995 mm (472.2 in)
- Width: 2,600 mm (102.4 in)
- Curb weight: 16,200 kg (35,715 lb)

The Hispano Globus was built on the 1623c chassis having a rear mount 5.9litres 235 hp Cummins 6BT series diesel engine with turbocharger and intercooler. The engine produces 800Nm torque at 1500rpm. It is primarily intended for tourist and long-distance duties. The coach was designed by Hispano Carrocera. The body shell was from Spain, and the bus was a re-badged version of Hispano Divo luxury coach.

== See also ==
- List of buses
