= Alfa Romeo 902A =

Bus produced by Alfa Romeo between 1957 and 1959

Overview
- Production: 1957-1959

Powertrain
- Engine: 6-cylinder 9495 cc

Dimensions
- Length: 11 m (430 in)

Alfa Romeo 902A is a bus produced by Alfa Romeo between 1957 and 1959.

== Technical characteristics ==
The bus used a body built by Sicca and had an Alfa Romeo 1606 engine with 130 hp. It also had two wheelbases at a length of 11 m. Featuring two doors, it provided space for 40 passengers. The engine used diesel as fuel.

== Versions ==
- Alfa Romeo 902AU
- Alfa Romeo 902AS

== Transport ==
The 902A was used in the ATM system in Milan

== Production ==
58 vehicles were produced of this type.

== See also ==
- List of buses
