= Alfa Romeo 900A =

Bus produced by Alfa Romeo from 1952 to 1956

Overview
- Production: 1952-1956

Powertrain
- Engine: 6-cylinder 9495 cc

Dimensions
- Length: 10.3 m (410 in)

Alfa Romeo 900A is a bus produced by Alfa Romeo from 1952 to 1956.

== Characteristics ==
The first model came with a length of 10.3 m. The bus had an Alfa Romeo 1606 engine with 130 HP and 2,000 revolutions per minute, with six cylinders.

Two longer versions were also produced.

== Production ==
- Alfa Romeo 900A by Carponi, 1952 to 1955 - 14 units
- Alfa Romeo 900A by Macchi 1955 to 1956 - 29 units
- Alfa Romeo 900 had a GranTurismo version by Macchi - 4 units.

== Operators ==
The Alfa Romeo 900A was used by ATM in Milan, Italy.

== See also ==
- List of buses
