= Alfa Romeo 800AF =

The Alfa Romeo 800AF is an Italian trolleybus produced from 1940 to 1954.

== History ==
During the fuel shortages of World War II, Alfa Romeo explored alternatives such as electric transport and made a new model trolleybus, the 800AF. The electric generators were produced with more efficiency. It used a body from Garavini.

== Technical characteristics ==
The length is around 9 m (350 in) and had 2 wheelbases. The height is 2,005 mm (78.9 in), and the width is 2,210 mm (87.0 in).

== Transport ==
It was originally constructed for the trolleybus network in Turin, Trieste and Como.

== See also ==
- List of buses
