= Alfa Romeo 430A =

Bus produced from 1949 to 1953 by Italian automotive manufacturer Alfa Romeo

Overview
- Production: 1949-1953

Dimensions
- Length: 11 m (430 in)

The Alfa Romeo 430A was a bus produced from 1949 to 1953 by Italian automotive manufacturer Alfa Romeo.

== Technical characteristics ==
The bus had two doors and a rack. It had a 130 hp (97 kW) engine. The bus had seating for 22 passenger and standing room for a further 30 people. The vehicle was 11 m (36 ft) in length. It was based on a body from Ambrosini.

== History ==
The Alfa Romeo 430A bus was used for tourist trips and for intercity service in the Lombardy region of Italy.

== See also ==
- Alfa Romeo 430
- List of buses
