= SOR BN 9,5 =

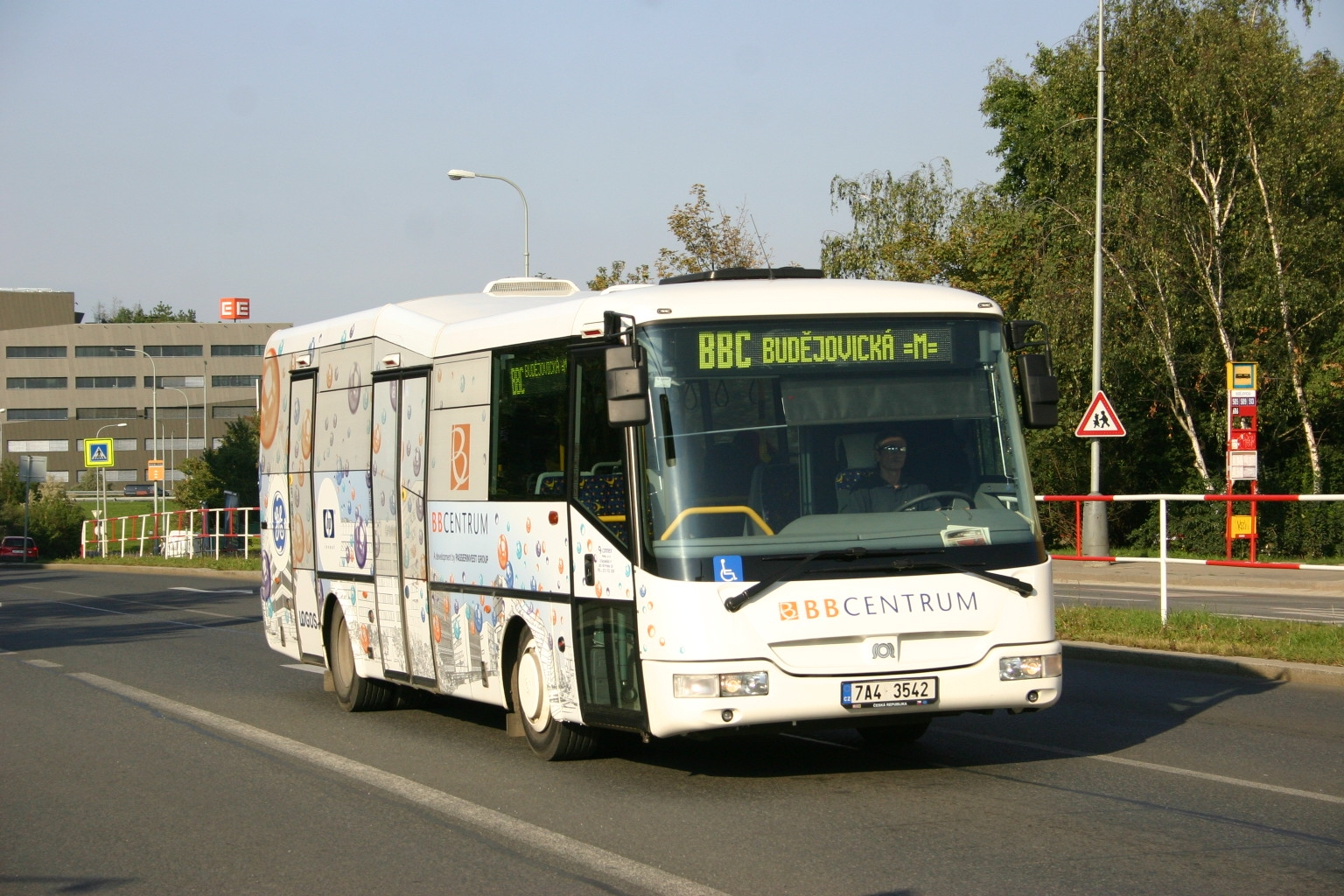
- SOR BN 9,5

Overview
- Manufacturer: SOR

Body and chassis
- Doors: 2 or 3
- Floor type: Low-entry bus

Powertrain
- Engine: Iveco Tector NEF Diesel engine
- Capacity: 26 sitting 48 standing
- Power output: 185 kW (248 hp)
- Transmission: 6-speed manual

Dimensions
- Length: 9,580 mm (377.2 in)
- Width: 2,525 mm (99.4 in)
- Height: 3,000 mm (118.1 in)
- Curb weight: 7,600 kg (16,800 lb)

SOR BN 9,5 is a model of a partly low-floor minibus manufactured by Czech company SOR Libchavy. The bus is designed for urban transport and deployed on lines where sufficient vehicles with a smaller capacity are needed due to the cramped conditions. The vehicle is suitable for service lines to medical and sanitary facilities and offices.

== Production and operation ==
The bus has been in production since 2005.
