= Isabel Cacciamali =

Italian footballer (born 1999)

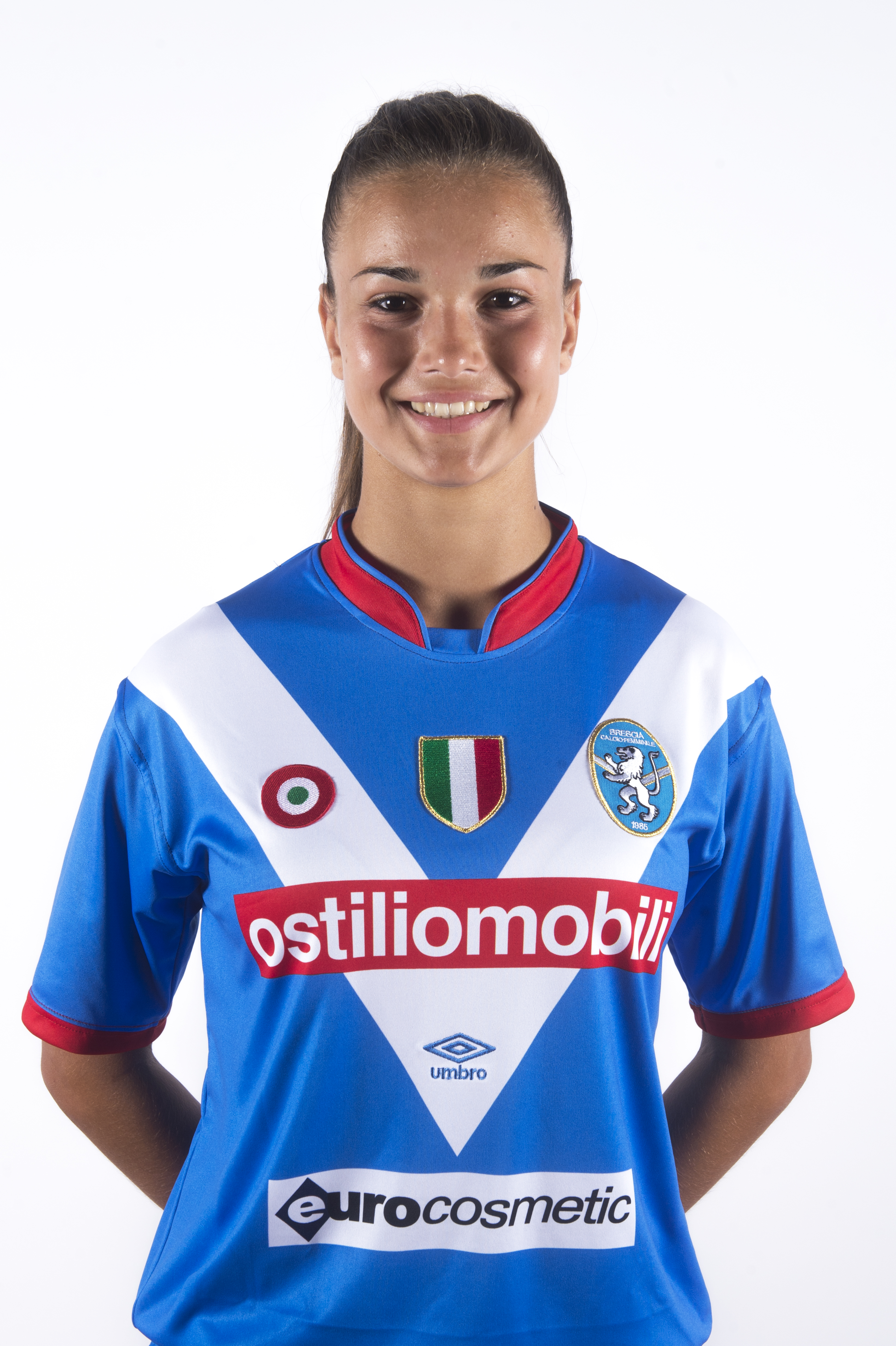

Personal information
- Date of birth: 10 July 1999 (age 27)
- Position: Forward

Team information
- Current team: Brescia

Isabel Cacciamali (born 10 July 1999) is an Italian professional footballer who plays as a forward for Brescia.
