= Autosan Sancity 10LF =

Single-decker bus

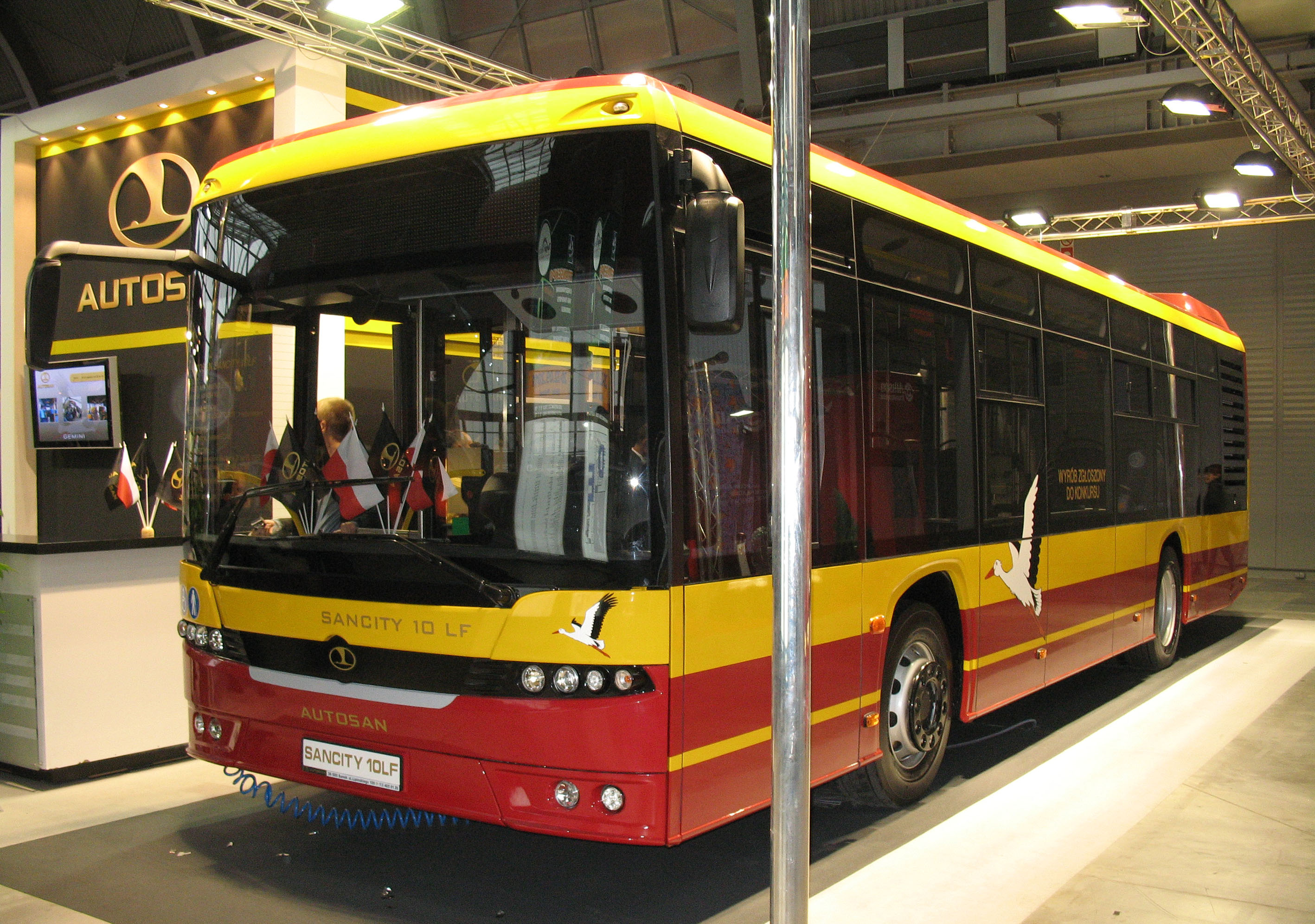

Autosan Sancity 10LF a single-decker bus built by Autosan S.A. in Sanok, Poland.

Production of Sancity 10LF started in 2012 and till January 2013 buses were sold to Poland and Italy. Autosan Sancity 10LF is 100% low floor citybus. It has 3 doors (2-2-2) and incorporates an EEV standard engine, although it is a midibus due to its length.
