= Inbus U150 =

Italian bus model

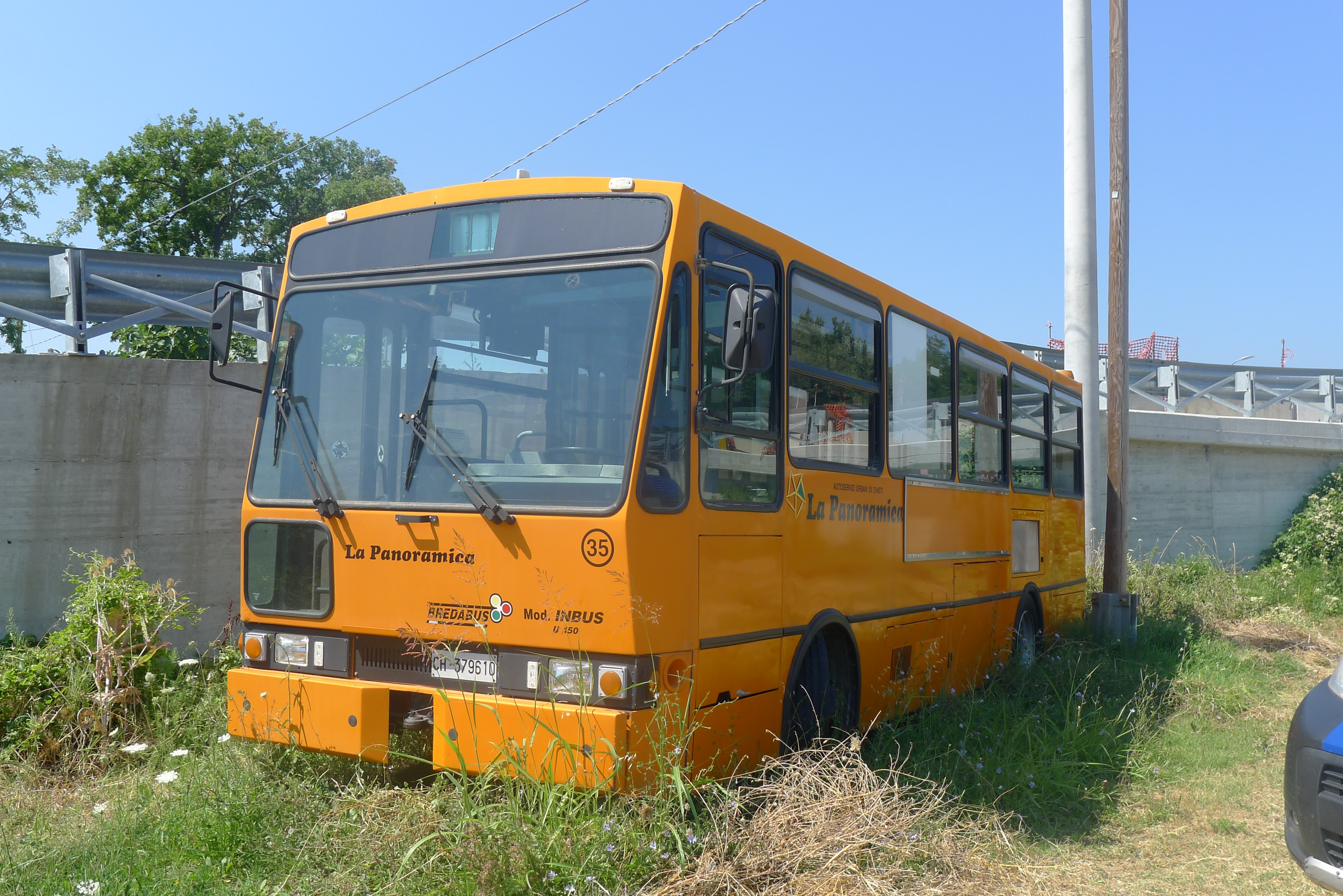
Inbus U150

Inbus U150 is an Italian city bus built by the Italian manufacturer Inbus between 1979 and 1993. The bus used a body from the manufacturer De Simon and a motor from OM CP3 with 148 HP.

== Inbus U150 in the transport systems ==
- Rome - 90
- Naples - 161
