= Wright TT =

Overview
- Manufacturer: Wrightbus
- Production: 1982-1987
- Assembly: Ballymena, Northern Ireland

Body and chassis
- Doors: 1
- Floor type: Step Entrance
- Chassis: Bedford VAS; Bedford YMT

Chronology
- Successor: Wright Endeavour

The Wright TT was a bus body built on Bedford VAS and Bedford YMT chassis by Wrightbus. It was introduced in 1982.
