= SOR BN 8,5 =

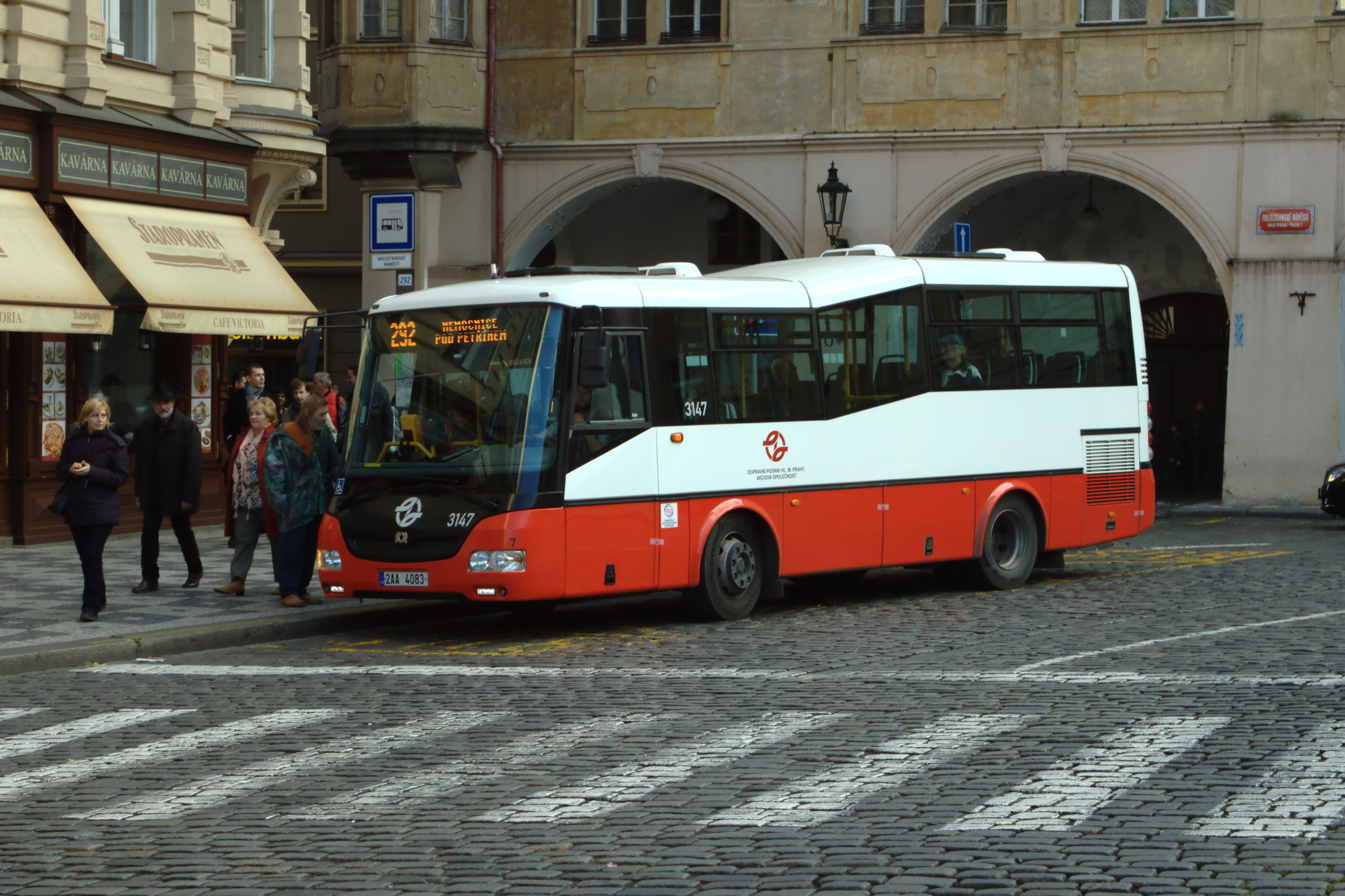
- SOR BN 8,5 made in the year 2010, operated by Prague transport company

Overview
- Manufacturer: SOR

Body and chassis
- Doors: 2
- Floor type: Low-entry bus

Powertrain
- Engine: Cummins ISBe 4,5l Euro 5 Diesel engine
- Transmission: 6-speed automatic

Dimensions
- Length: 8,400 mm (330.7 in)
- Width: 2,525 mm (99.4 in)
- Height: 2,950 mm (116.1 in)
- Curb weight: 7,100 kg (15,700 lb)

SOR BN 8,5 is a model of a partly low-floor minibus manufactured by Czech company SOR Libchavy. The bus is designed for urban transport and deployed on lines where sufficient vehicles with a smaller capacity are needed due to the cramped conditions of the road infrastructure. It is suitable for service lines to medical and sanitary facilities and offices.

== Construction features ==
Model BN 8,5 is similar to the model SOR CN 8,5, from which it differs mainly with automatic transmission. Vehicles supplied for MHD Chrudim and for public transport in Frýdek-Místek (ČSAD Frýdek-Místek), however, have a mechanical six-speed transmission.

== Production and operation ==
Bus is produced since 2010 until now.
