= Articulated bus =

Articulated vehicle used in public transportation

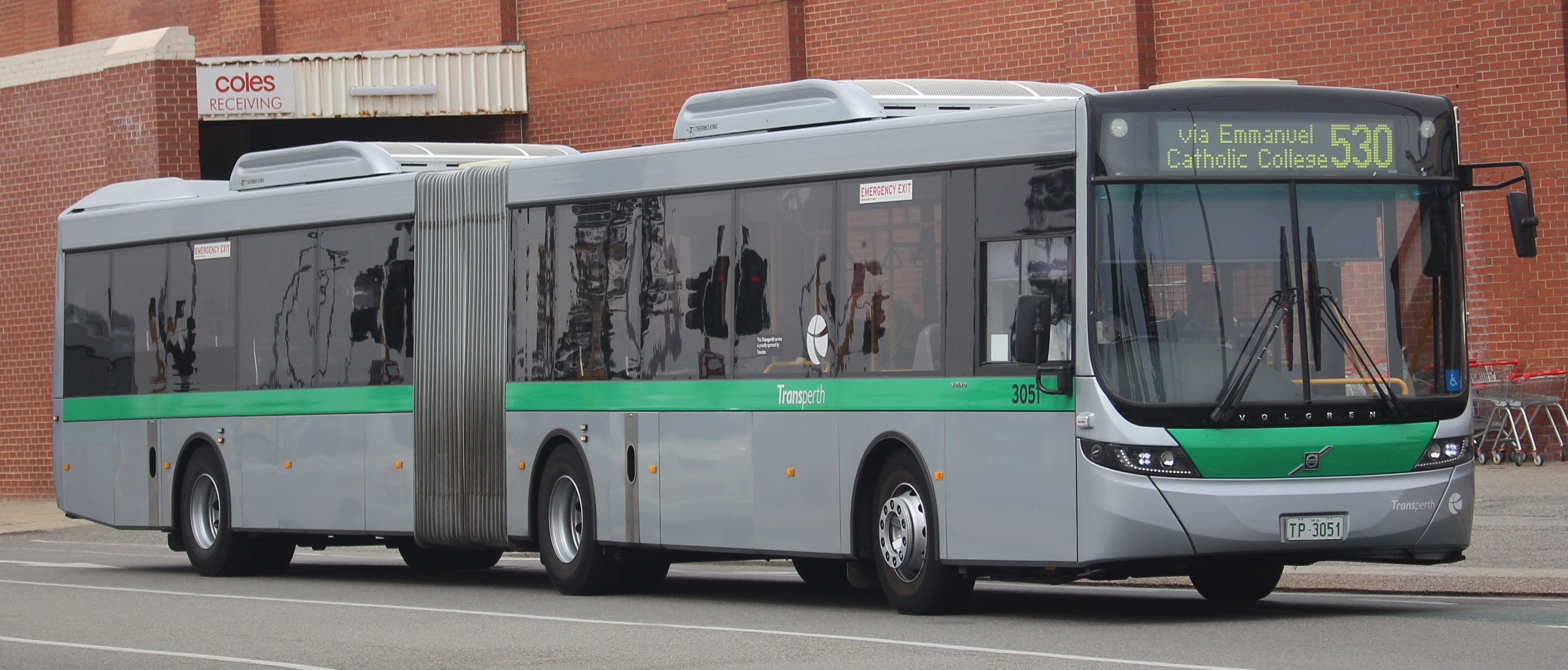
Volgren Optimus bodied Volvo B8RLEA of Transperth, Perth, Western Australia, Australia, November 2018

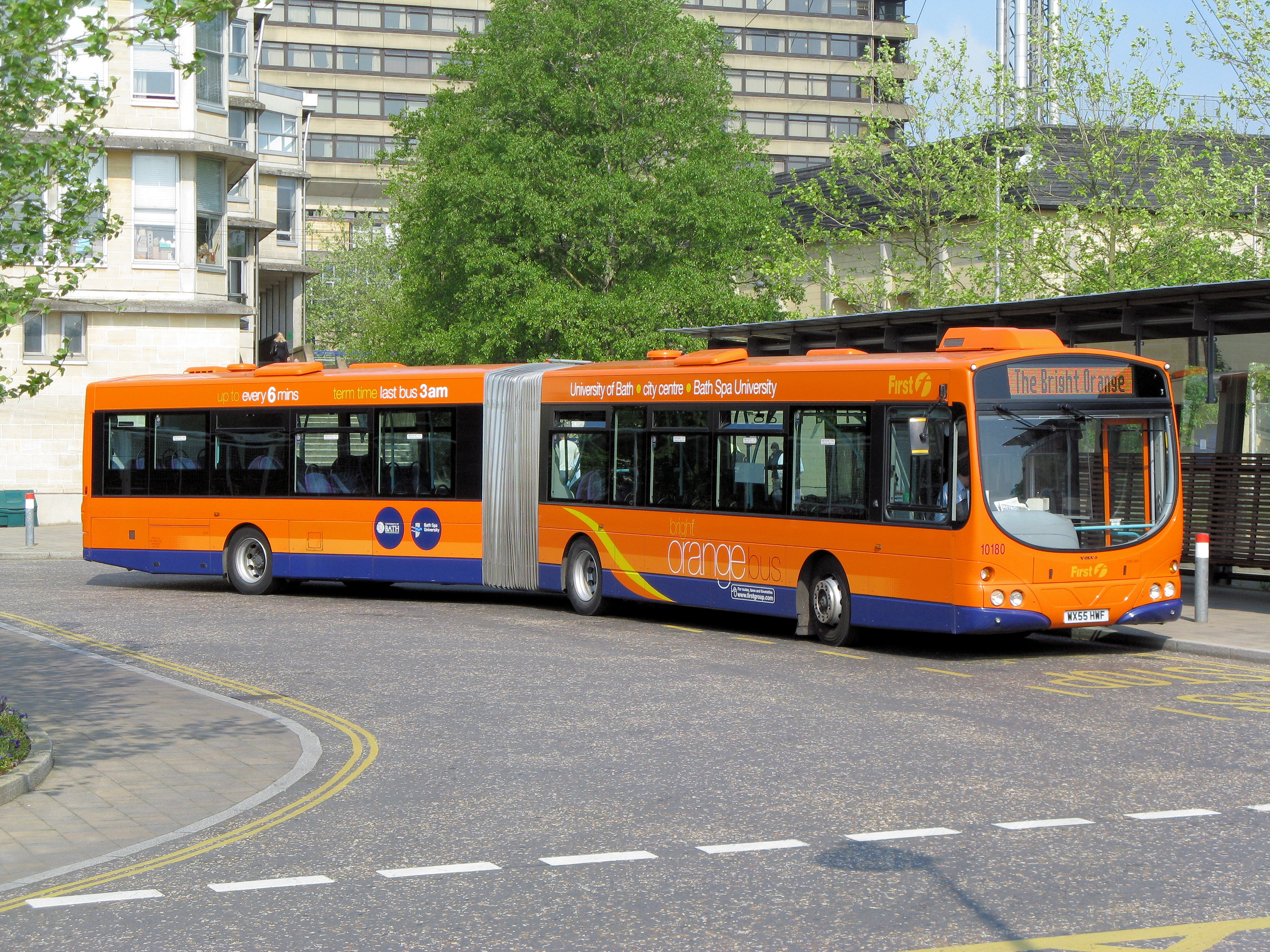
An articulated Wright Eclipse Fusion, bending as it drives round a corner at the University of Bath, England, May 2008

An articulated bus, also referred to as a Slinky bus, an artic, bendy bus, tandem bus, vestibule bus, stretch bus, or an accordion bus, is an articulated vehicle, typically a motor bus or trolleybus, used in public transportation. It is usually a single-decker, and comprises two or more rigid sections linked by a pivoting joint (articulation) enclosed by protective bellows inside and outside, and a cover plate on the floor. This allows a longer legal length than rigid-bodied buses, and hence a higher passenger capacity (94–120), while still allowing the bus to maneuver adequately.

Due to their high passenger capacity, articulated buses are often used as part of bus rapid transit schemes, and can include a mechanical guidance system and electric bus or trolleybus. Articulated buses are typically 18 m (59 ft) long, in contrast to standard rigid buses at 11 to 14 m (36 to 46 ft) long. The common arrangement of an articulated bus is to have a forward section with two axles leading a rear section with a single axle, with the driving axle mounted on either the front or the rear section. Some articulated buses have a steering arrangement on the rearmost axle that turns slightly in opposition to the front steering axle, allowing the vehicle to negotiate tighter turns, similar to hook-and-ladder fire trucks operating in city environments. A less common variant of the articulated bus is the bi-articulated bus, where the vehicle has two trailer sections rather than one. Such vehicles have a capacity of around 200 people, and a length of about 25 m (82 ft); as such, they are used almost exclusively on high-capacity, high-frequency arterial routes and on bus rapid transit services.

== History ==
The first example of the articulated bus appeared in Milan, Italy, in 1937. In 1938, Twin Coach built an articulated bus for the city of Baltimore; this bus, which had four axles on a 47 ft (14.33 m) long body, was only articulated in the vertical direction to accommodate steep grades. Fifteen examples of the 'Super Twin' were built in 1948, but it was not developed further. According to contemporary coverage, the Super Twin had a capacity of 58 seated and 120 total, with a weight of 27,500 lb (12,500 kg).

In Budapest, the first prototypes of the Ikarus 180 (named for its 180-passenger capacity) were shown in 1961. There is an ongoing exhibition in Budapest at the Hungarian Technical and Transportation Museum in 2010 with the title "The articulated bus is 50 years old." The Ikarus 180 went into limited production in 1963 and entered serial production in 1966; the Ikarus 180 was discontinued in 1973 when its successor, the Ikarus 280, was released.

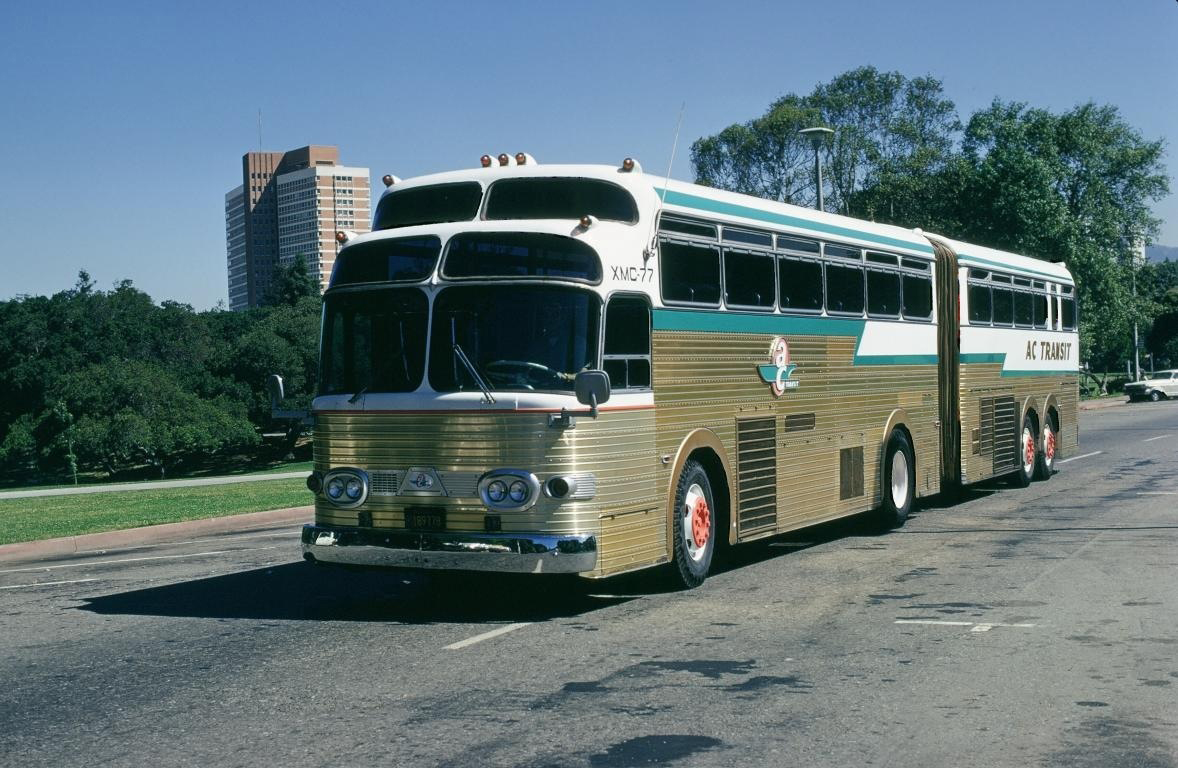
AC Transit XMC-77

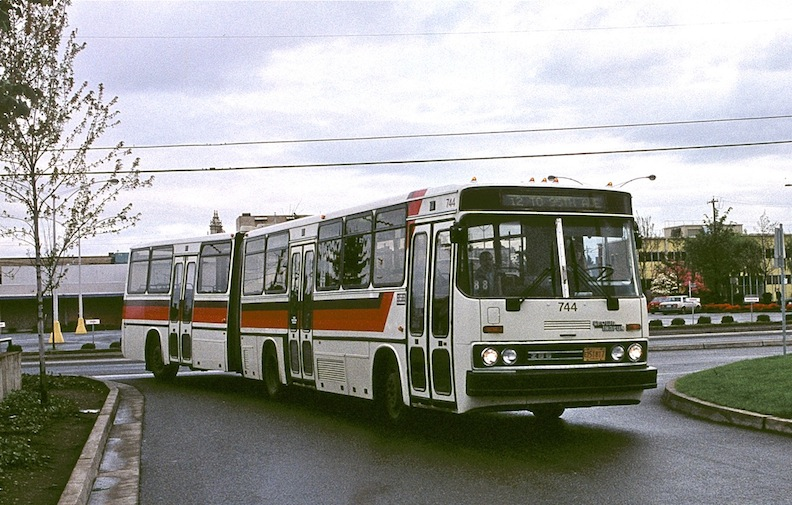
Crown-Ikarus 286 for TriMet (1993)

In the mid-1960s, AC Transit in California pioneered the American use of a modern articulated bus, operating the experimental commuter coach "XMC 77" (based on Continental Trailways' Bus & Car Co. Super Golden Eagle model) on some of its transbay lines. The XMC-77, which AC Transit dubbed the "Freeway Train", was originally built in 1958, purchased by the District in October 1965, and made its debut run for Line N on 14 March 1966; passengers on the inaugural run were presented with special souvenir tickets. XMC-77 was later exhibited to the public at various locations in the East Bay and the Transbay Terminal. It offered seats for 77 passengers (finished in brown and orange) and an observation lounge, complete with a card table to seat a quartet. The 60 ft (18.3 m) long coach stood 10 ft 10 in (3.30 m) high and was powered by a Cummins engine with an output of 262 hp (195 kW). Engineering for the XMC-77 was carried out by the local firm of DeLeuw Cather & Co.

In the United States, articulated buses were imported from Europe and deployed in the late 1970s and early 1980s. During this time, rising operating costs led to public takeovers of transit systems, and the pressure to reduce labor (driver) costs in turn meant transporting more passengers in a single vehicle. King County Metro and Caltrans led a Pooled Purchase Consortium, formed in 1976, which later awarded a contract to the AM General/MAN joint venture responsible for assembling MAN SG 220 (from Germany) articulated buses in America. Contemporaneously, Crown entered an agreement with Ikarus to produce the Crown-Ikarus 286, coupling American-made powertrains with the Hungarian Ikarus 280 chassis.

Articulated buses have also been used in Australia, Austria (Gräf & Stift), Italy, Germany (Gaubschat, Emmelmann, Göppel, Duewag, Vetter), Canada (LFS Articulated), Hungary (Ikarus), Poland (Jelcz AP02), Romania (DAC 117 UD). The first modern British "bendy buses" (as they are referred to in the UK and Canada) were built by Leyland-DAB and used in the city of Sheffield in the 1980s. They were subsequently withdrawn from service because they proved to be expensive to maintain.

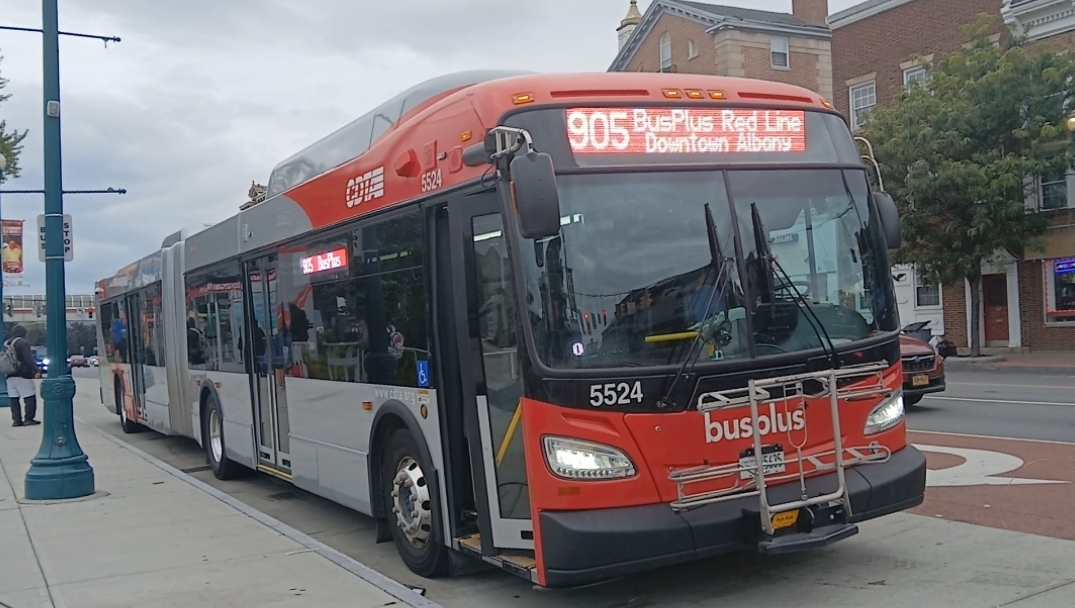
a New Flyer XD60 for CDTA

In 1989, New Flyer Industries introduced the D60, a high floor, Diesel powered articulated bus. Hybrid and electric versions were also made. This was followed up with the D60 LF/DE60, the first low-floor articulated buses in the United States and Canada. New Flyer also manufactured the D60/DE60/E60 LFR, D/DE60 LFA. The current New Flyer models are the Xcelsior XD/DE/E60.

NovaBus created an articulated bus, called the NovaBus LFSA, in 2007, and production has continued since.

In the 2020s articulated buses evolved from being diesel powered to almost all being Electric, and environment-friendly. The Electric versions of articulated buses are powered by batteries. In Goiânia, Brazil, the first ever fully electric fleet of articulated buses went into service in 2026.

== Advantages and disadvantages ==
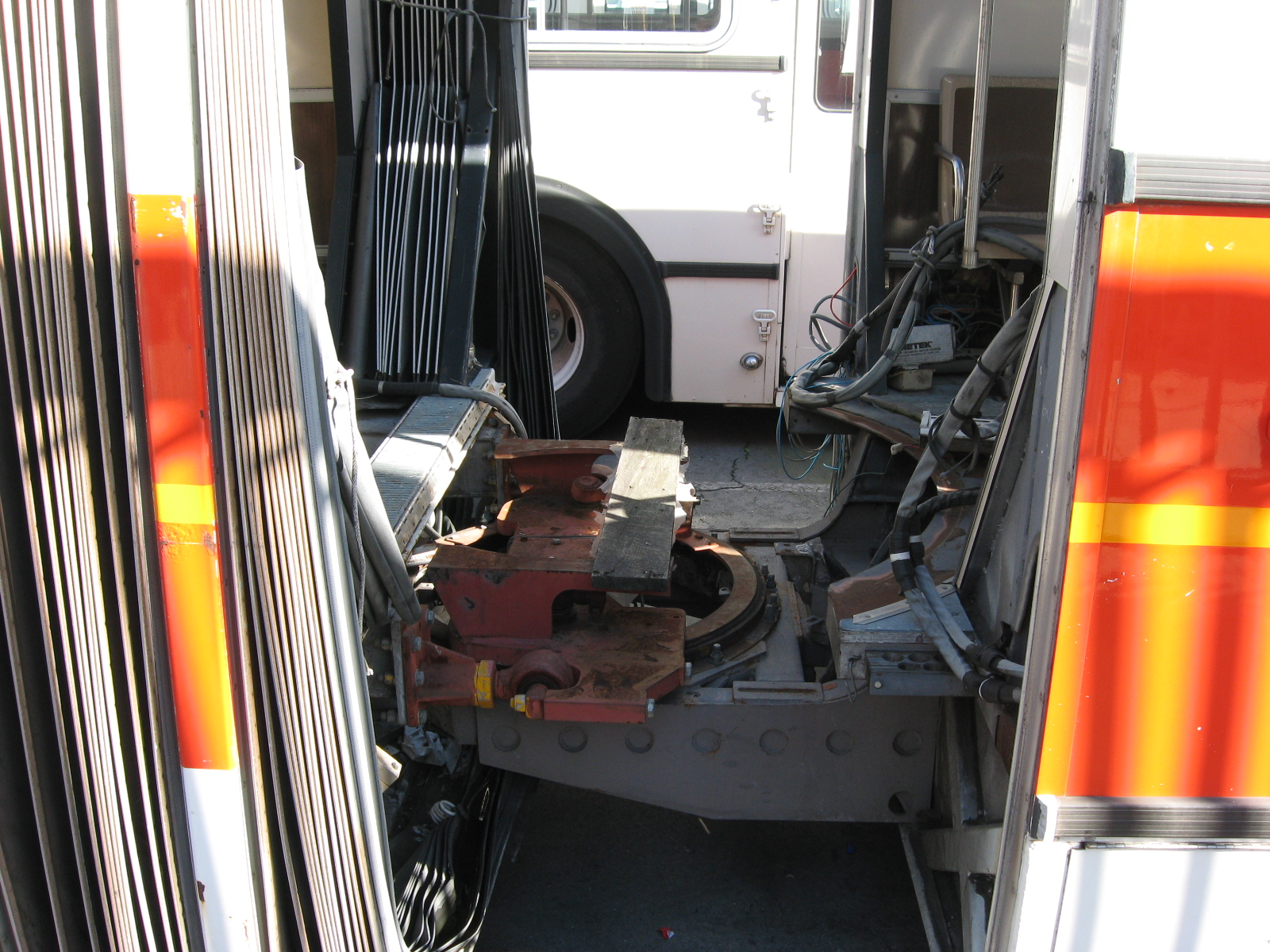
The articulation joint mechanism

=== Advantages ===
The main benefits of an articulated bus over the double-decker bus are rapid simultaneous boarding and disembarkation through more and larger doors, increased stability arising from a lower center of gravity, smaller frontal area giving less air resistance than double decker buses thus better fuel efficiency, often a smaller turning radius, higher maximum service speed, the ability to pass under low bridges, and improved accessibility for people with disabilities and the elderly.

=== Disadvantages ===
In some circumstances of urban operation (such as in areas with narrow streets and tight turns), articulated buses may also be involved in significantly more accidents than conventional buses. Estimates for London's articulated buses put their involvement in accidents involving pedestrians at over five times the rate of all other buses, and over twice as high for accidents involving cyclists. In a period when articulated buses made up approximately 5% of the London bus fleet, they were involved in 20% of all bus-related deaths, statistics which eventually led to their replacement. However, these safety statistics may be partly skewed due to the buses having been used on the busiest routes in the most crowded areas of the city, making them look worse than the buses they were being compared with. The last disadvantage of an articulated bus is that it requires a specially trained driver in some cases (see below).

Articulated buses also struggle on snowy or icy road surfaces, because the rear axle delivers power; this causes the bus to “jackknife” or bend in the middle when attempting to go up a hill or through a snowdrift.

== Use ==
An articulated bus is a long vehicle and usually requires a specially trained driver, as maneuvering (particularly reversing) can be difficult. The trailer section of a "puller" bus can be subject to unusual centripetal forces, which many people can find uncomfortable, although this is not an issue with "pushers". Nonetheless, the articulated bus is highly successful in Budapest, Hungary, where the BKV city transit company has been operating more than 1000 of them every day since the early 1970s. The Hungarian company Volán also runs hundreds of articulated buses on intercity lines.

=== Europe ===
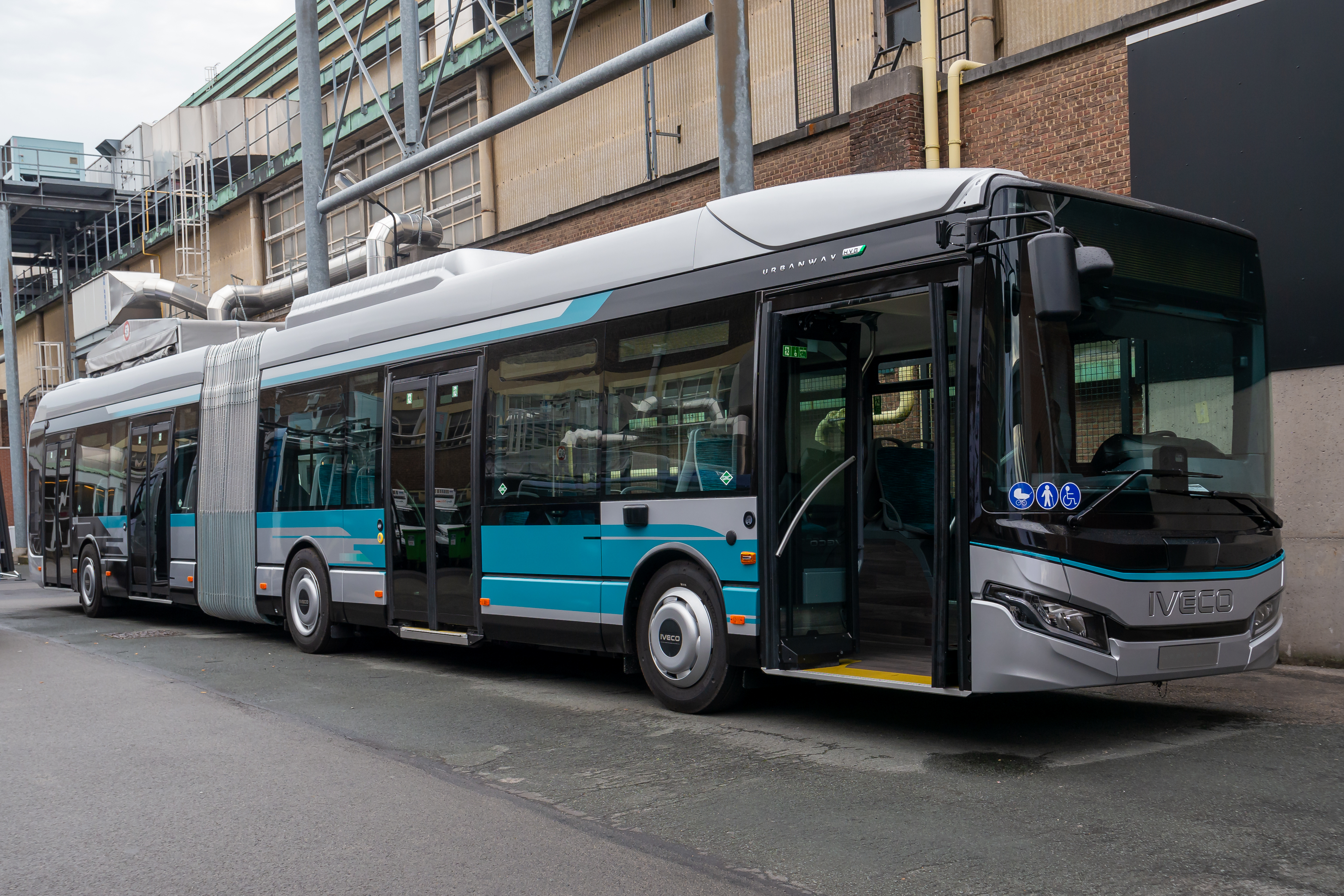
Iveco Urbanway

Articulated buses have been used in most European countries for many years. Articulated buses became popular in mainland Europe due to their increased capacity compared with regular buses. In many cities, lower railway bridge clearances have precluded the use of double-deck vehicles, which have never achieved great popularity there. Overhead wires for trams, trolleybuses, etc., are not really relevant issues, as the minimum normal clearance above road level is standard across the EU and is well in excess of the height of a double-deck vehicle—otherwise, many freight vehicles would encounter severe problems in the course of normal operation.

==== Malta ====
From 3 July 2011 to 28 August 2013, articulated Mercedes Citaro buses purchased from London were used in Malta by the company Arriva on a number of routes across the country. A number of serious engine fires resulted in their withdrawal from service, and they have also been responsible for causing an increase in traffic congestion and accidents involving pedestrians and cyclists.

==== United Kingdom ====
Until 1980, articulated buses were illegal on the UK's roads. A 1979 experiment by South Yorkshire Passenger Transport Executive with buses manufactured by MAN and Leyland-DAB led to a change in the law, but the experiment was abandoned in 1981 because double-decker buses were generally considered less expensive both to purchase and to operate. The cost and weight of the strengthened deck framing and staircase of a double-decker were lower than the cost and weight of the additional axle(s) and coupling mechanism of an articulated bus. Modern technology has reduced the weight disadvantage, and the benefits of a continuous low floor allowing easier access, plus additional entrance doors for smoother loading, have led to reconsideration of the use of articulated buses in the UK.

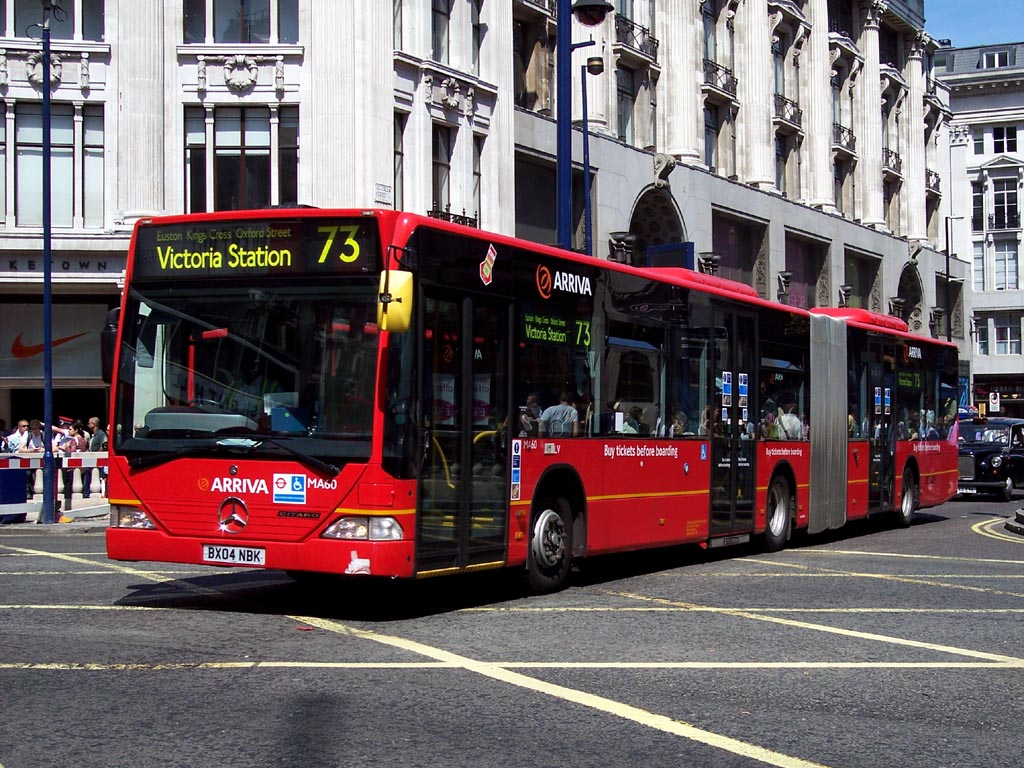
Arriva London Mercedes-Benz Citaro O530G on route 73 at Oxford Circus in June 2006

In London, articulated buses were used on some routes from 2001 until 2011, but they were not a success. Boris Johnson, former Mayor of London, promised in the run-up to the mayoral election of 2008 to rid the city of the controversial buses and replaced them with double-deckers.

Elsewhere in the UK, they are generally operated on particular routes in order to increase passenger numbers, rather than across entire networks. With unsupervised "open boarding" through three doors and the requirement for pre-purchase of tickets, levels of fare-dodging on the new vehicles were found to be at least three times higher than on conventional buses, where entry of passengers is monitored by the driver or conductor. The only way of checking for free riders was to use large teams of ticket inspectors to swamp the bus and inspect all tickets while keeping the doors closed, meanwhile delaying the further progress of the bus. Since the articulated buses were tending to serve areas of relative deprivation, it is suspected that this was a contributory factor in Transport for London (TfL) turning against the concept.

Many of the articulated buses from London went on to serve with regional operators. Aside from limited use in regional cities, articulated buses may now be found at airports as park-and-ride shuttles.

A batch of 9 Mercedes-Benz Citaros currently run on First Aberdeen routes 1 and 2, and 5 others run with First York on York Park and ride services 2 and 3, but are being phased out by the more modern Wright StreetDeck and Optare MetroDecker

In 2020, twenty-one brand new Mercedes-Benz Citaros entered service at Stansted Airport; the Mercedes Benz Citaro is the only articulated bus available in the United Kingdom at present.

The last public Wright Eclipse Fusion bendy buses ran on 26 March 2023 on service 888 between Luton airport and Luton airport parkway station, the service being replaced by the Luton DART monorail service.

=== Asia ===
==== Bangladesh ====
BRTC bought 50 articulated bus in 2012 to run services in the capital and some divisional cities. More buses were planned to be procured for running on dedicated route.

==== China ====
In Asia, many major Chinese cities had fleets of articulated buses prior to the late 1990s. Some of these fleets have since been replaced by single-section units except in a few cities, namely Beijing, Shanghai, and Hangzhou. In the 2000s, a surge in BRT construction has reintroduced or re-purposed the articulated bus fleets for rapid transit usage in cities like Changzhou, Chengdu, Dalian, Guangzhou, Jinan, Kunming, Xiamen, Yancheng, Yichang, Zaozhuang, and Zhengzhou.

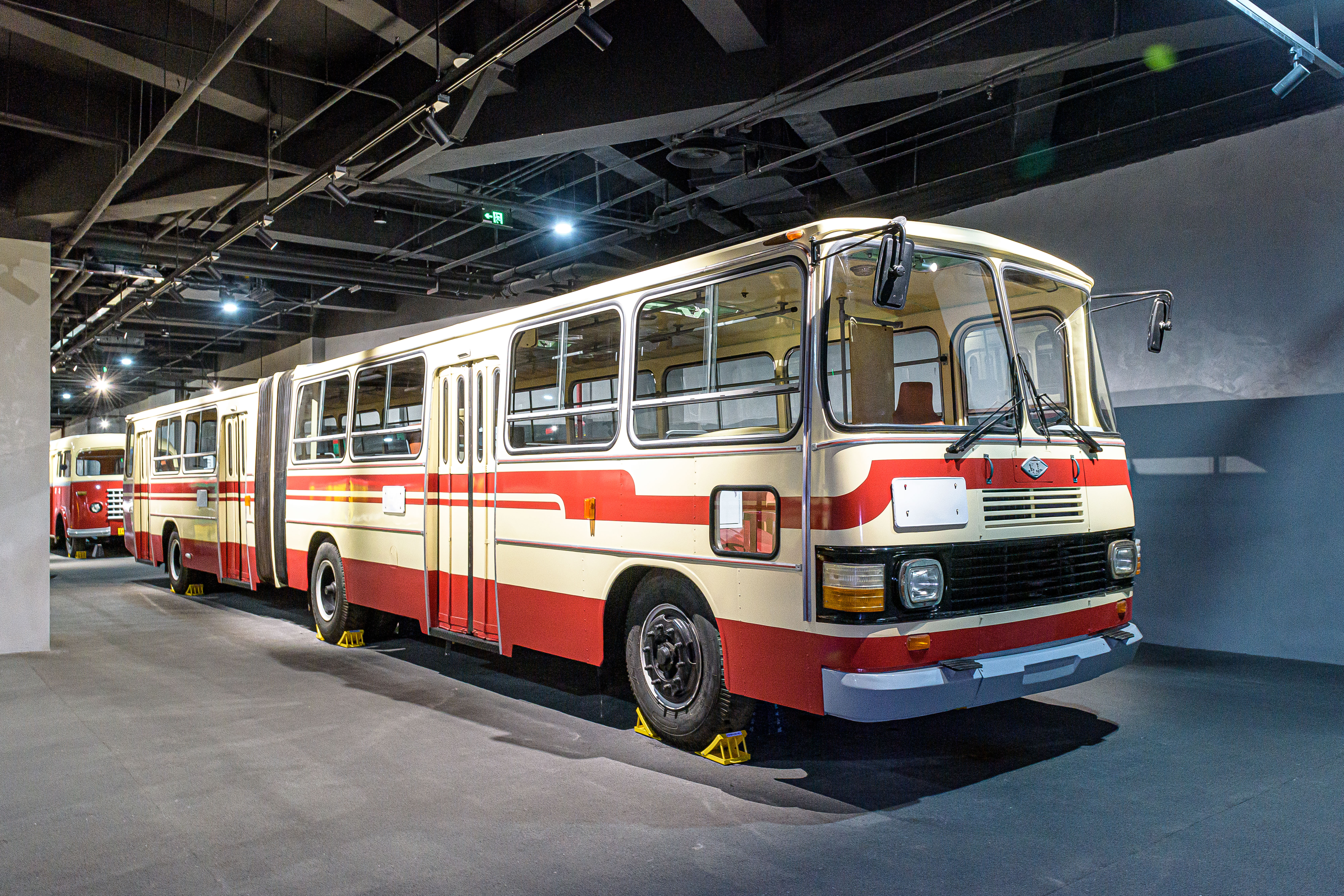
Replica of the Jinghua BK670, a 1970s-1980s front-engined articulated bus model based on Huanghe JN150 trucks, in Beijing

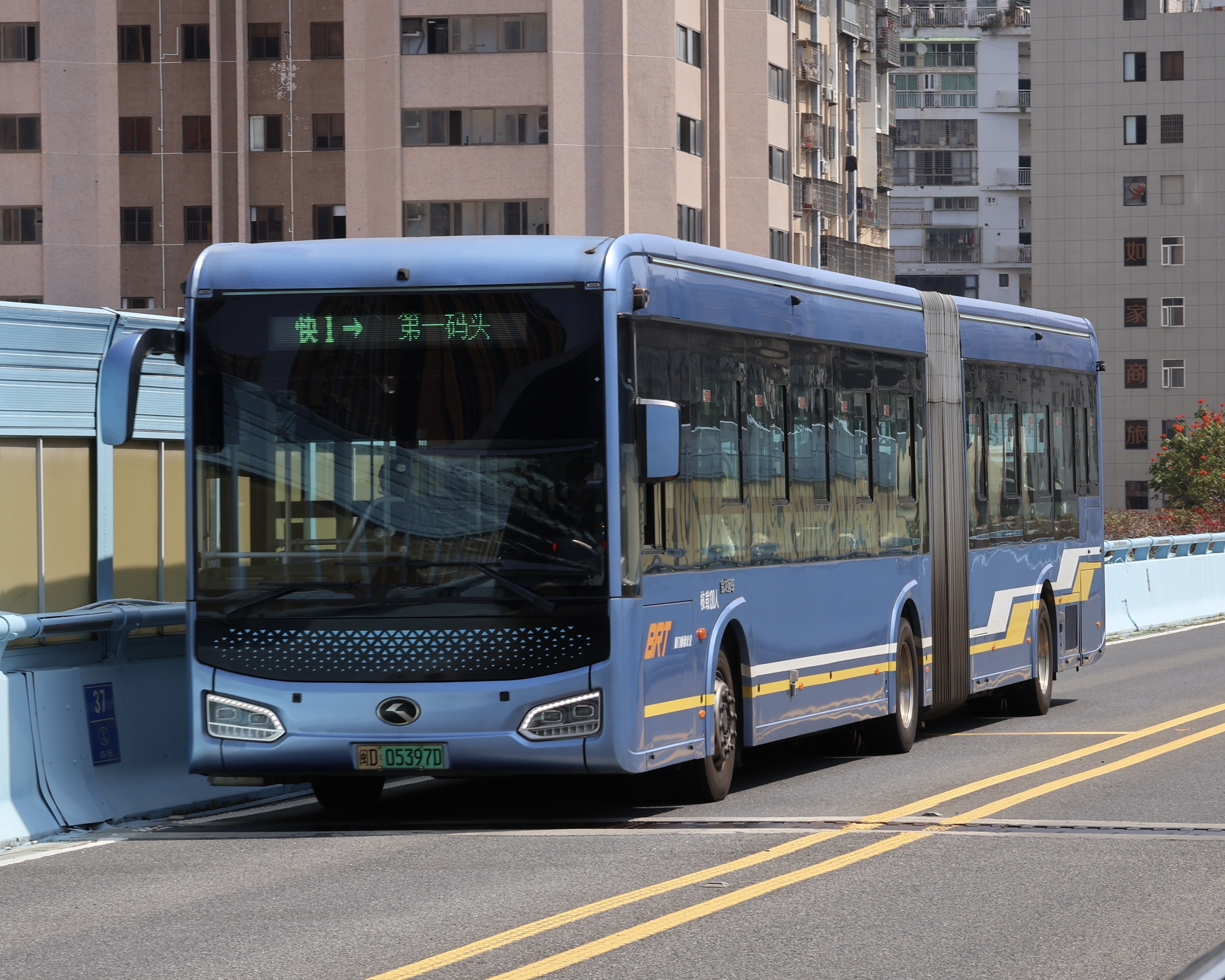
King Long XMQ6180AGBEVL used by Xiamen BRT

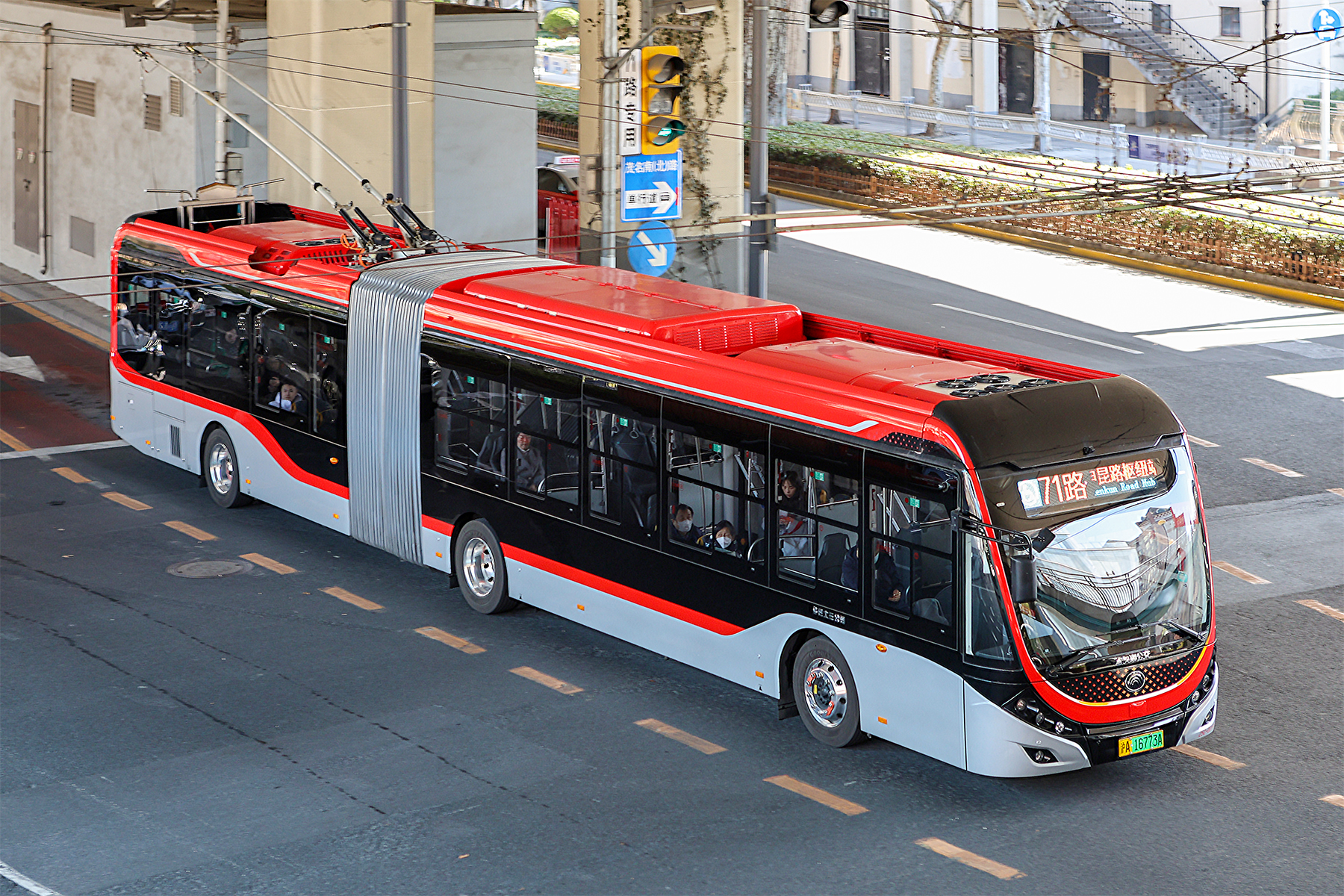
Yutong ZK5180C, an articulated trolleybus used by Shanghai Bus Route 71

==== Indonesia ====
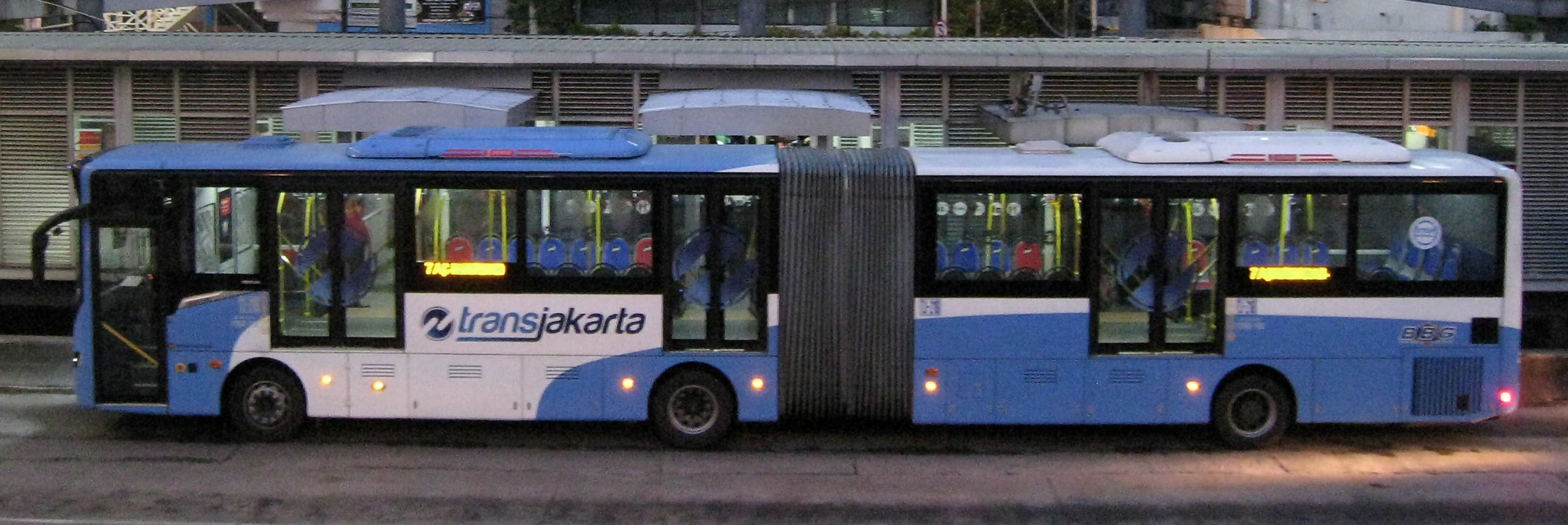
A Scania TransJakarta bus in Harmoni Central Busway Station, Jakarta

Indonesia first operated articulated buses in 1993, when Jakarta's bus company PPD began to operate Ikarus articulated buses from Hungary on several busy lines. Later, the company also imported Chinese-made articulated buses. PPD dominated Jakarta city bus service until 2004, when Transjakarta was established; it operates one of the longest BRT systems in the world. Transjakarta has been using articulated buses manufactured by Scania for some of their busiest routes since 2015. Prior to Scania buses' introduction, there were Chinese-made Huanghai, Zhong Tong, Yutong, Ankai, and local-made INKA Inobus and AAI Komodo buses in service since 2010.

==== Israel ====
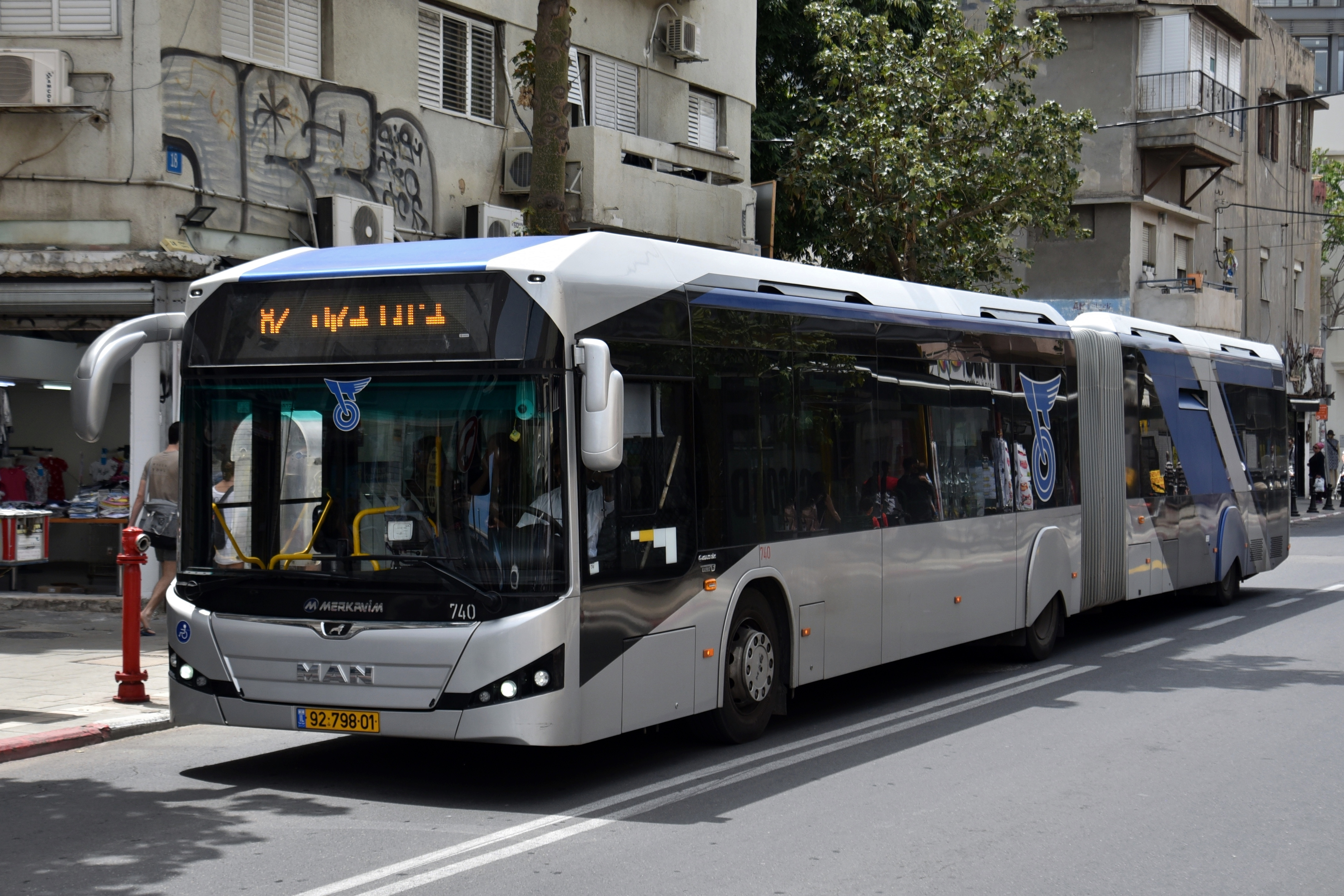
An articulated bus in Tel Aviv

In Israel, the use of articulated buses—commonly called accordion bus, אוטובוס אקורדיון—is widespread, particularly in Gush Dan and Jerusalem, the two great urban centers of the country, as well as in Haifa (for the Metronit BRT system) and other cities such as Beersheba. The long buses are considered reliable and useful, and have been in service in Israel since the mid-1970s. During the Israeli–Palestinian conflict, such buses were often targeted by suicide bombers during rush hours, since a crowded long bus can contain more than 100 passengers.

==== Macau ====
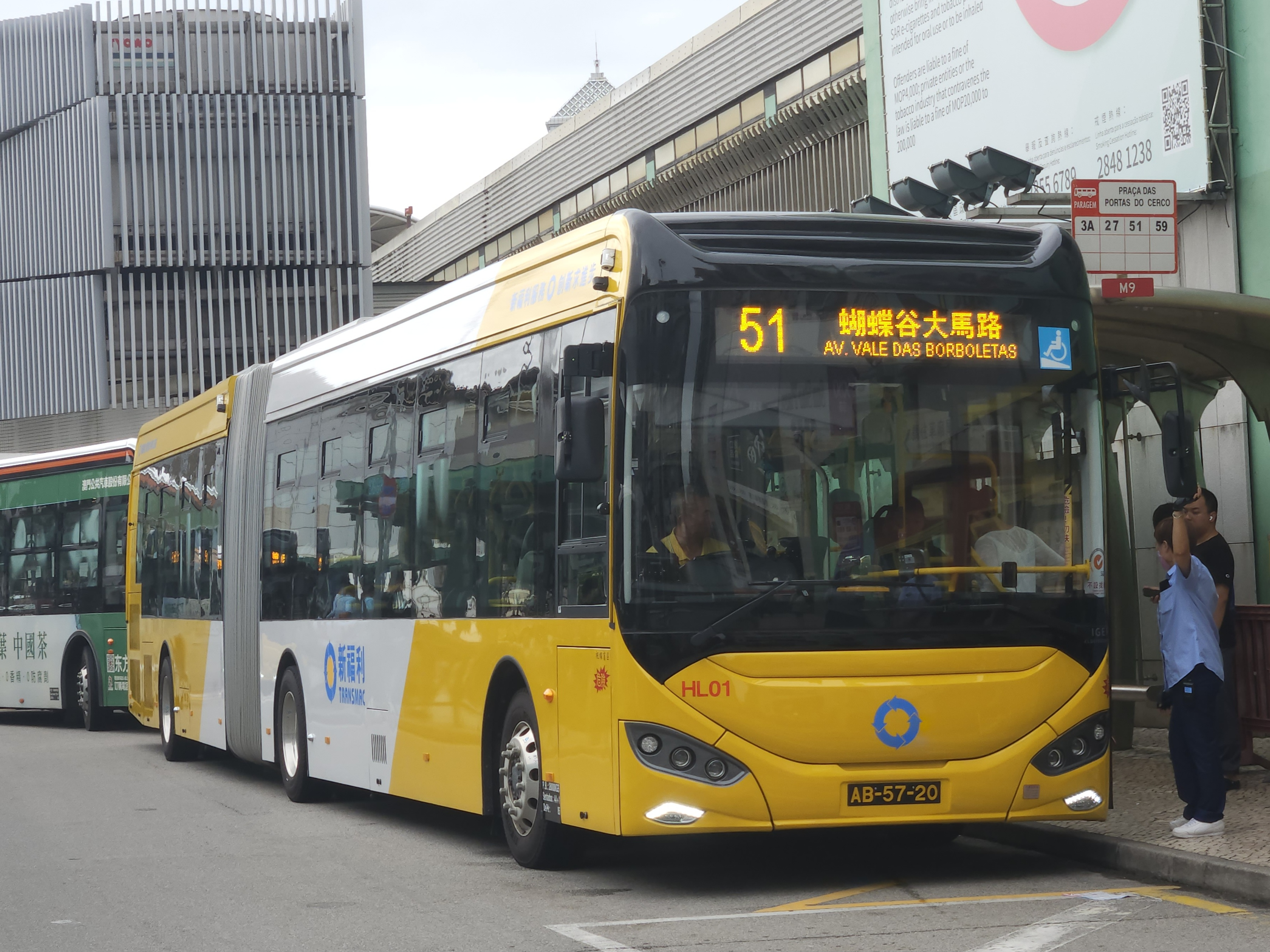
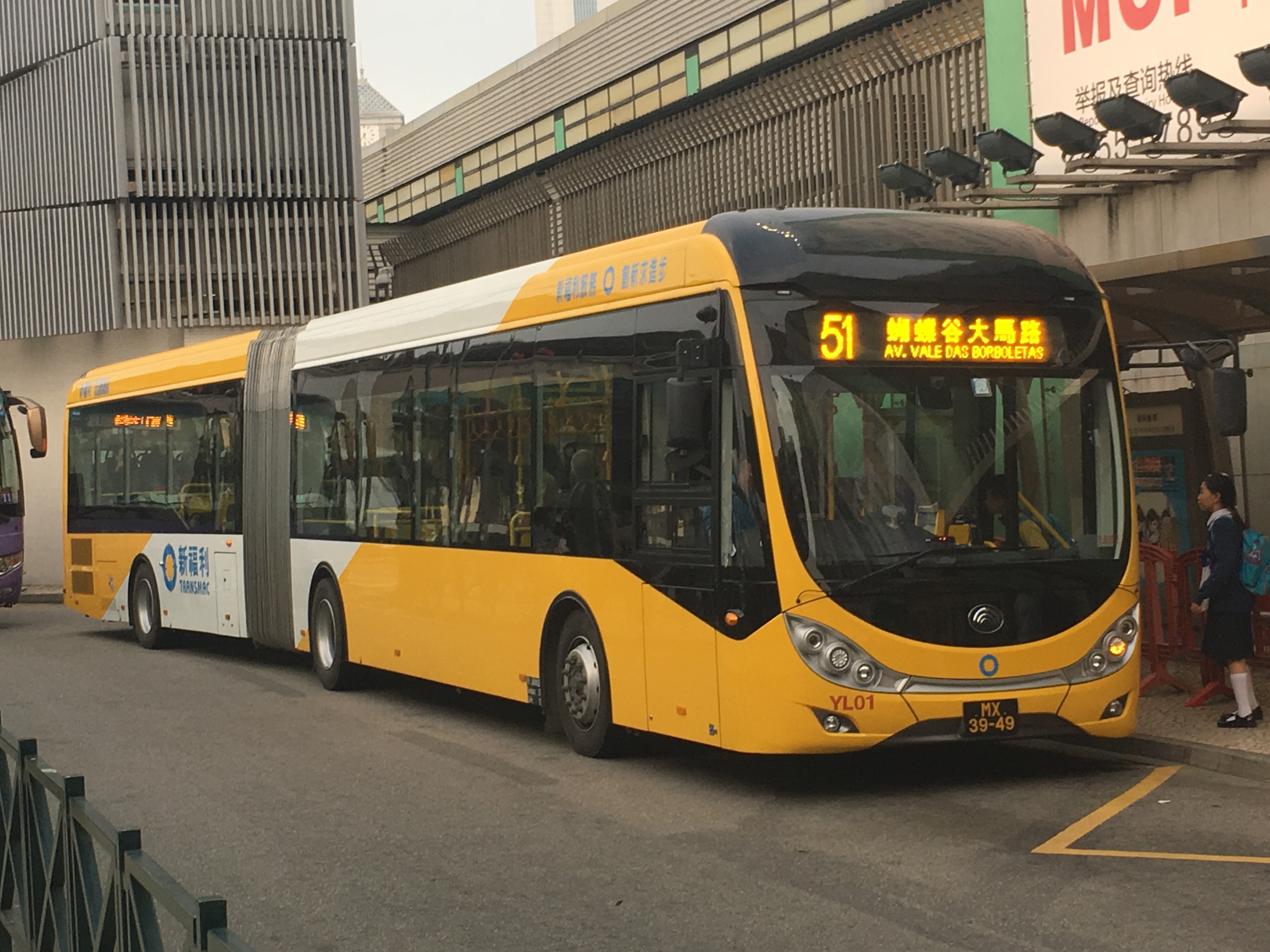
Transmac HE01, one of the two new Higer KLQ6186GHEV extended range electric articulated buses in Macau. (left) and YL01, an older Yutong ZK6180HGH articulated bus in Macau. (right)

In Macau, China, Transmac (Transportes Urbanos de Macau S.A.R.L.) imported a Yutong ZK6180HGH 18-meter articulated bus model, and put it into operation on 6 January 2018 following multiple tests and adjustments. The bus operated on route 51 and 25BS during peak hours. It also served route 25AX before typhoon wipha/on golden weeks in 2019 and also route 26S after the annual international firework shows. In 2023, Transmac imported two 18-meter Higer KLQ6186GHEV extended range electric articulated bus model that runs on the same route 51, 25BS and 26S as its predecessor, first put into operation on 21 January 2024 as an after-show shuttle in Macau. The old ZK6180HGH is now used for non-franchised services, such as event shuttles or casino employers shuttles, as the government tends to fade out all diesel buses from franchised services.

==== Taiwan ====
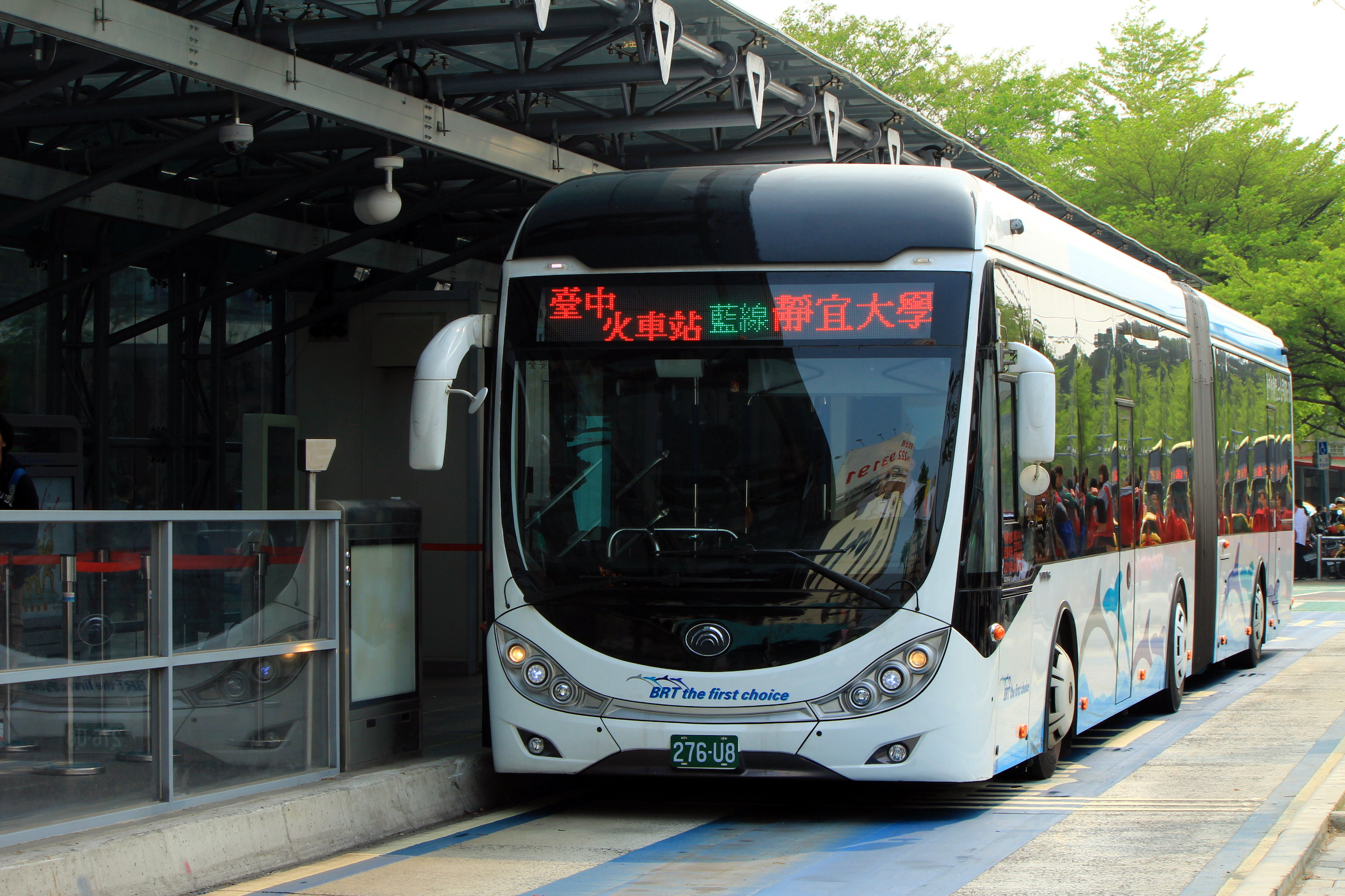
A Taichung BRT Bus

Articulated buses were first used in Taiwan in 2014 as the Taichung BRT. The BRT system was abolished a year later, and the articulated buses run as regular buses along the same route.

==== Vietnam ====
In Vietnam, articulated bus service was first introduced and operated on 16 October 2010, by Transerco in Hanoi. It was added to the route 07 from My Dinh Bus Station to Noi Bai Airport as a test run. The bus was part of the Hanoi Ecotrans project subsidized by the EU and Île-de-France. It was a Mercedes Euro II Galaxy which was first manufactured in December 2003 by Mercedes-Benz Vietnam and was previously used for SEA Games in Hanoi. The bus was painted yellow instead of traditional white-yellow-red (from top to bottom) and had two ticket sellers onboard instead of one. The bus received positive reviews from passengers but the bus no longer operates in Hanoi; route 07 is now served by Daewoo BC095 buses.

=== North America ===
==== United States ====
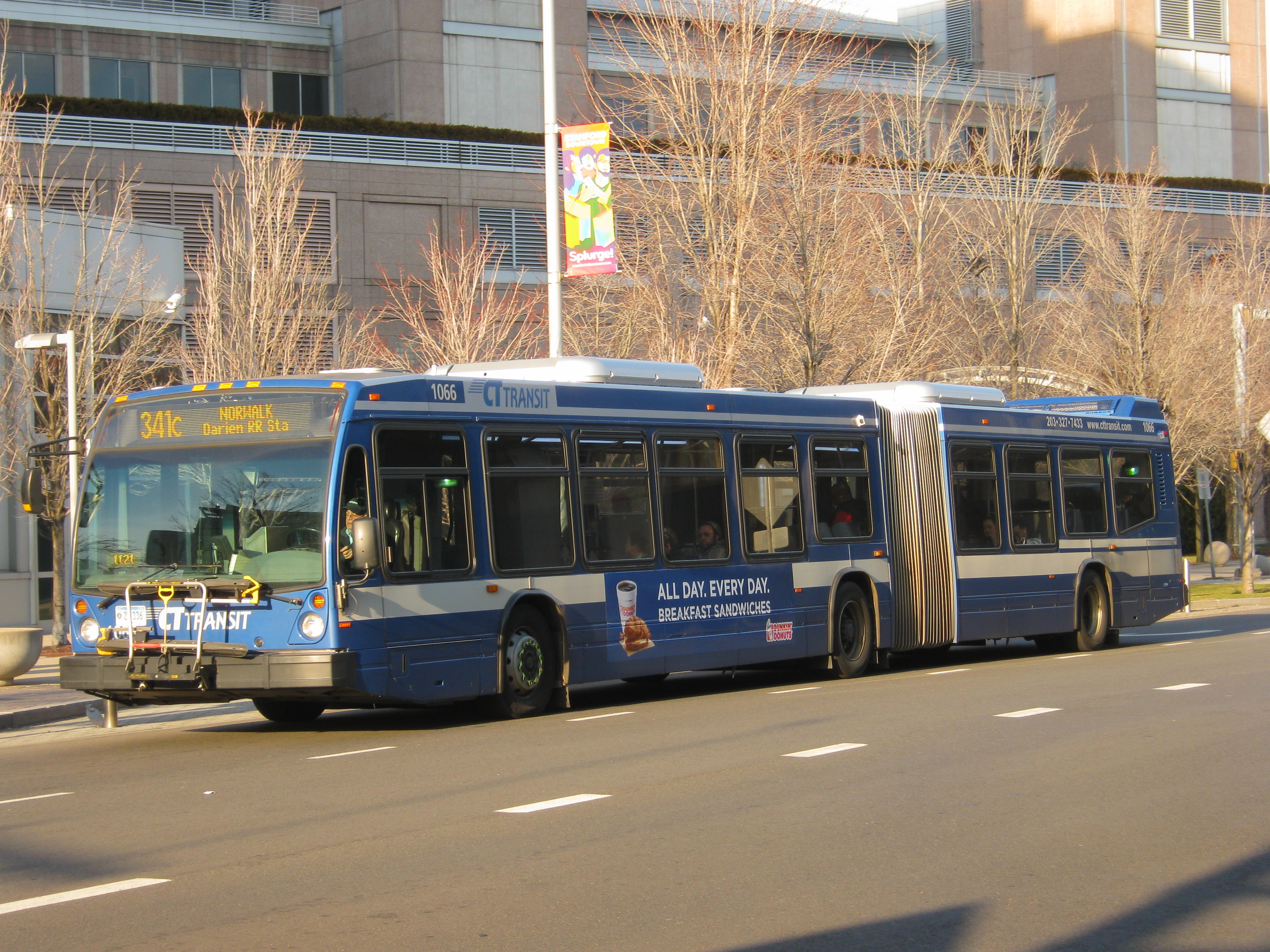
CT Transit Nova Bus LFS articulated in Waterbury, CT

Articulated buses are commonplace in US urban centers such as Albuquerque, Austin, Baltimore, Boston, Chicago, Cleveland, Denver, Honolulu, Indianapolis, Los Angeles, West Palm Beach, Miami, Minneapolis-St.Paul, New York City, Newark, Orange County (California), Orlando, Philadelphia, Phoenix, Pittsburgh, Portland (Oregon), Rochester (New York), San Diego, San Francisco, Seattle, Washington, D.C., and Westchester County (New York). In Eugene, Lane Transit District uses articulated buses on some high-traffic routes, as well as on their Emerald Express (EmX) Bus Rapid Transit Service. In Vancouver, Washington, C-Tran uses articulated buses on their BRT service, The Vine. Currently in the US, articulated buses are manufactured by New Flyer, using their Xcelsior line, or by NovaBus, with their LFS model.

==== Canada ====
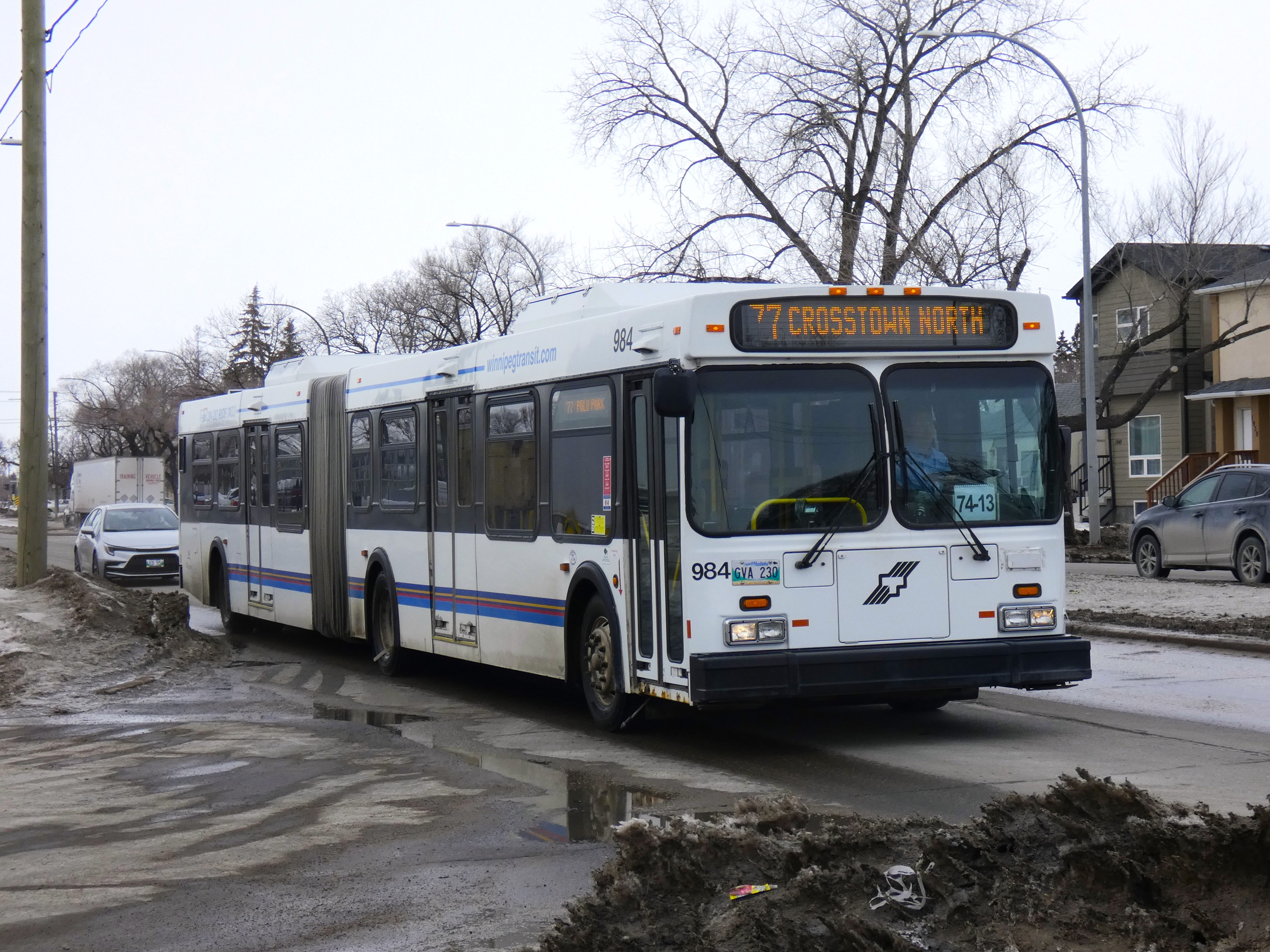
Winnipeg Transit New Flyer D60LF on Route 77

In Canada, they are used in Brampton, Calgary, Durham Region, Edmonton, Gatineau, Halifax, Hamilton, London, Longueuil, Mississauga, Montreal, Niagara Region, Ottawa, Quebec City, Regina, Saskatoon, St. Albert, Toronto, York Region, Metro Vancouver and Winnipeg.

==== Mexico ====
Articulated buses in Mexico are usually used on BRT lines, such as Mexico City's Metrobús, Guadalajara's Macrobús, Monterrey's Ecovía and León's Optibús.

=== South America ===
In South America, they are used in Quito, São Paulo, Recife, Feira de Santana, Santiago, Curitiba, Barranquilla, Cali, Bucaramanga, Pereira, Cartagena, Medellín and Bogotá.

=== Oceania ===
==== Australia ====
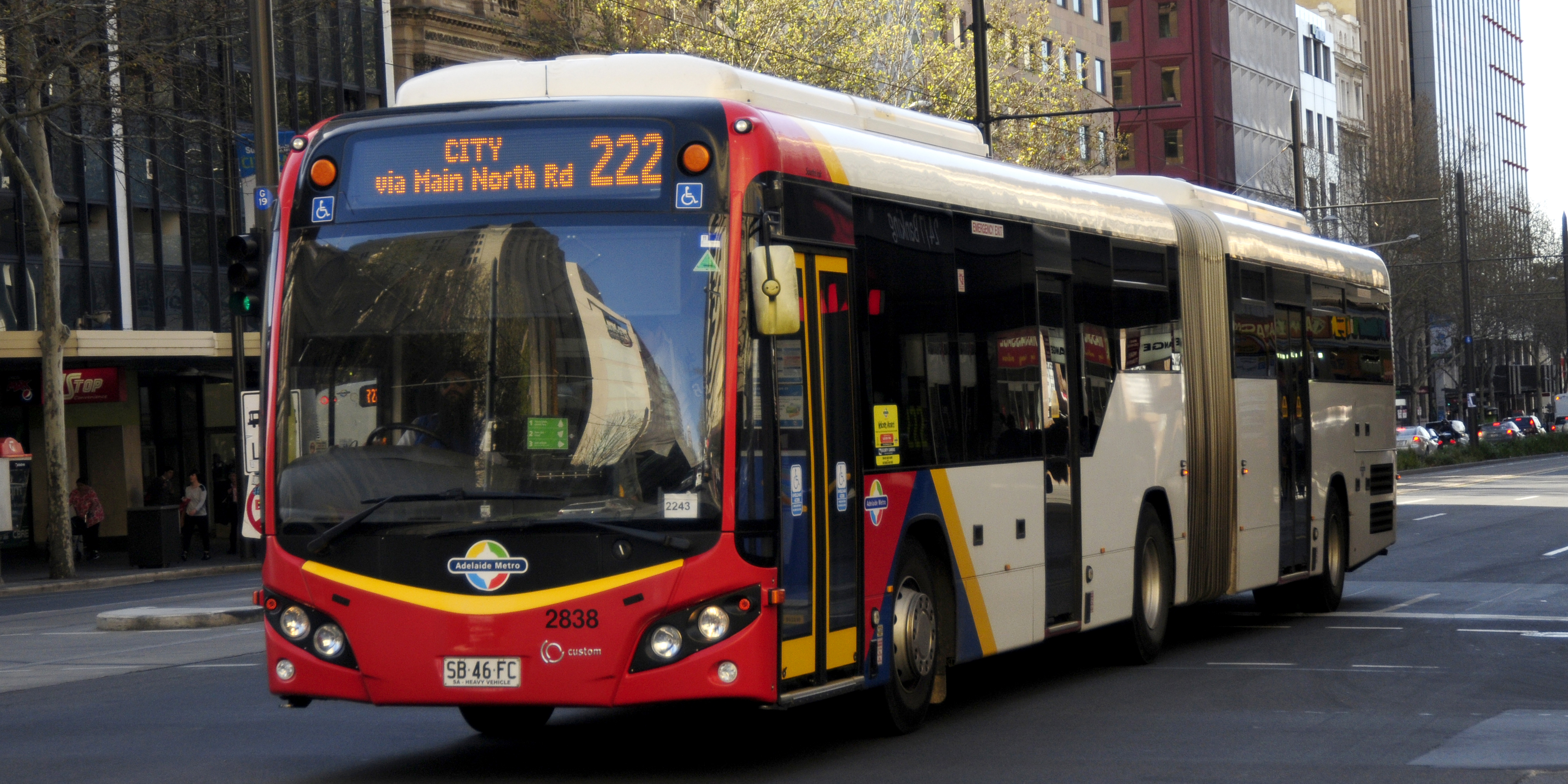
Scania K320UA articulated bus operating for SouthLink

The first articulated bus in Australia operated in Canberra in the Australian Capital Territory in 1974. They remain in service for Transport Canberra serving both rapid and feeder routes.

In Adelaide, articulated buses are used on the O-Bahn Busway, reaching speeds of 100 km/h. The first articulated buses to use it were the Mercedes-Benz O305G buses; however, three MAN SG280H buses are also equipped for O-Bahn use. In recent years, it has proven problematic to find suitable low-floor articulated buses to replace the 1984-manufactured Mercedes buses, because the design of the O-Bahn track unfortunately precludes the use of most modern articulated buses. Sydney has seen the operation of articulated buses for many years. Currently it operates a fleet of various models with eighty Volvo B12BLEA buses joining the Sydney Buses fleet in 2005 and 2006, increasing capacity along many of the busy corridors. A number of prototype vehicles were delivered in 2008 and 2009 to operate on Sydney Buses' first Metrobus route, the M10 from Leichhardt to Kingsford and Maroubra Junction. The buses feature different chassis, body types, and internal layouts. The articulated Volvo B12BLEA buses are fully wheelchair-accessible, air-conditioned, and have visual and audible next-stop passenger information systems installed. The buses feature air-conditioning, large electronic destination displays and cloth seating. Additionally, each bus features a stepless entry, which will assist less-mobile passengers. Flip-up seats in the front part of the bus allow easy accommodation for passengers in wheelchairs and with strollers and prams. In 2009–2010 150 new Volvo B12BLEA articulated buses have been introduced into the Sydney Buses fleet, many of these part of the expanded Metrobus program.

== Design ==
Schematic of an articulated bus, showing four passenger doors and two powertrain configurations.

=== Doors ===
Articulated buses typically feature at least two and sometimes three curbside doors for passengers. Because the articulation joint is close behind the middle axle, usually four potential passenger door positions are possible on a single-articulated bus:

1. Between the windshield and front axle (A)
2. Between the front axle and middle axle (B)
3. Between the articulation joint and rear axle (X)
4. Between the rear axle and rear bulkhead (Y)

=== Powertrain and chassis ===
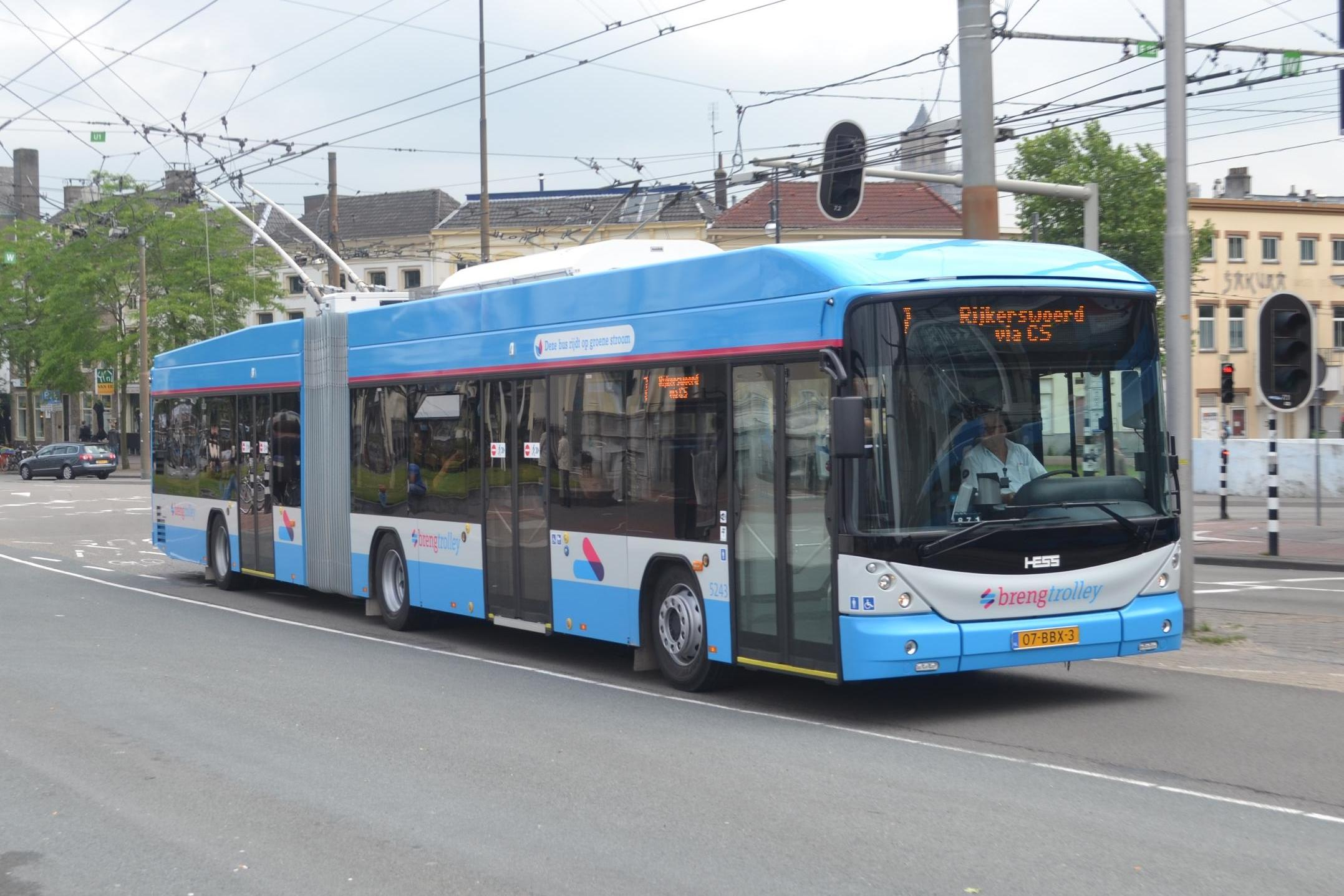
Articulated trolleybus in Arnhem

Articulated buses can be of "pusher" or "puller" configuration. Very few companies specialise in manufacturing the articulated section for the buses. One that does is ATG Autotechnik GmbH in Siek near Hamburg.

==== Puller ====
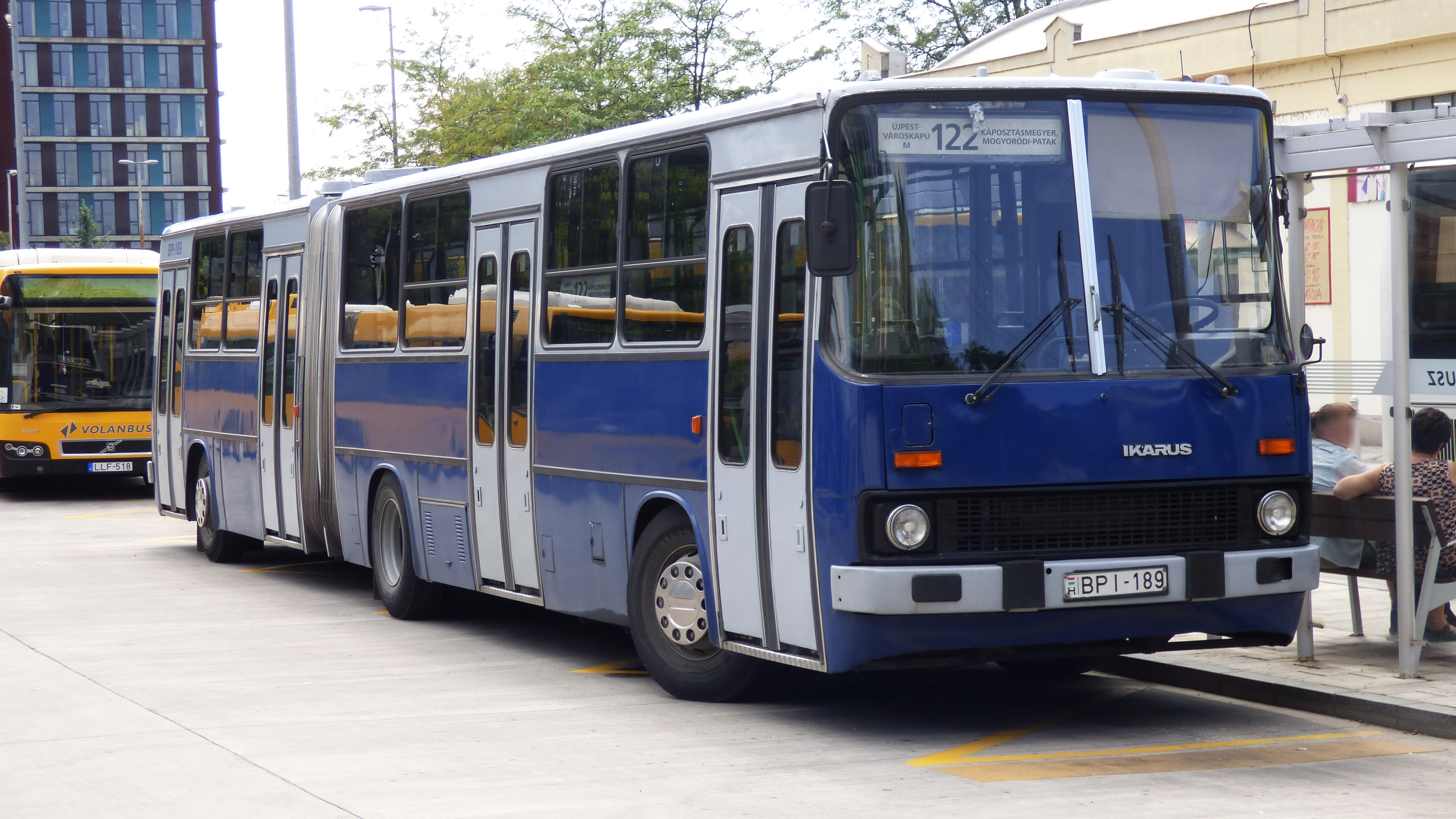
Ikarus 280 in Hungary

In most puller articulated buses, the engine is mounted under the floor between the front and middle axles, and only the middle axle is powered. Some consider this an outdated design, as it prohibits floor levels lower than approximately 750 millimetres (29.5 in), and can produce passenger discomfort due to high noise and vibration levels. On the other hand, they can be used in very narrow or severely potholed streets. This type of bus also performs better in snowy or icy conditions, as the thrust from the driving wheels does not cause the vehicle to jackknife. Newer models such as the Van Hool AG300 feature low floors while maintaining the puller design by placing the engine block off-center opposite to the second door. Also, the unpowered rear axle is much simpler and carries no engine weight, facilitating the installation of counter-steering mechanisms to further decrease the turning radius.

A typical puller model is the Hungarian-made Ikarus 280, the articulated version of the Ikarus 260, of which 60,993 buses were manufactured between 1973 and 2002, mostly for Soviet bloc customers. (This type accounted for two-thirds of the articulated buses built in the 1970s.) Puller-type articulated buses are built in less numbers, but are still available in Scandinavia and South America. Examples being the Volvo B9S and Volvo B12M.

==== Pusher ====
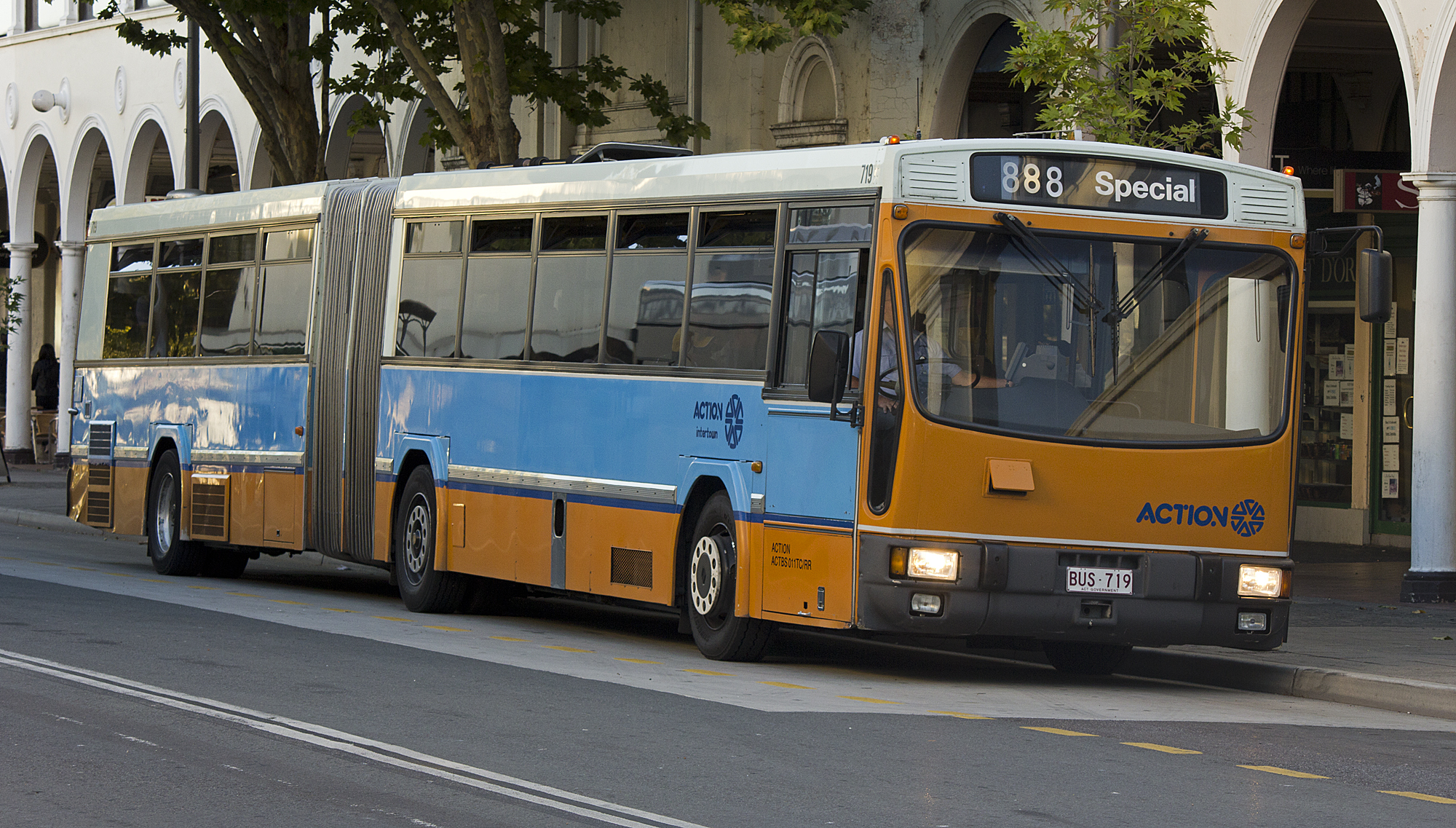
An ACTION Renault PR180.2, an example of an articulated bus with a pusher system

The pusher bus needs a damping system in the joint to reduce the risk of jack-knifing and fishtailing. This was developed by the FFG Fahrzeugwerkstätten Falkenried in Germany. The production cost of the pusher bus was lower than that of a puller bus. The puller bus was a completely different construction compared to a solo bus which was often fabricated by external body construction firms due to the lower production numbers compared to solo buses. The pusher concept enabled the bus manufacturer to simply join a forward and a rear part of a solo bus and build the articulated bus completely in-house. This reduced the production cost.

In pusher buses, only the rear axle is powered by a rear-mounted internal combustion engine, and the longitudinal stability of the vehicle is maintained by active hydraulics mounted under the turntable. This modern system makes it possible to build buses without steps and having low floors along their entire length, which simplifies access for passengers with limited mobility.

Modern low-floor pusher articulated buses also tend to suffer from suspension problems because their wheels lack sufficient travel to enable them to absorb typical road surface unevenness. This also leads to passenger discomfort and relatively rapid disintegration of the vehicle's superstructure.

Makers of pusher-type articulated buses include Mercedes-Benz, New Flyer Industries, MAN, Volvo and Scania. The Renault PR 180 and PR 180.2 (articulated versions of the PR 100 and PR 100.2) were a special variation of the pusher design in which both the middle and the rear axles were driven, with a driveshaft passing through the turntable between the two driving axles.

==== Energy source ====
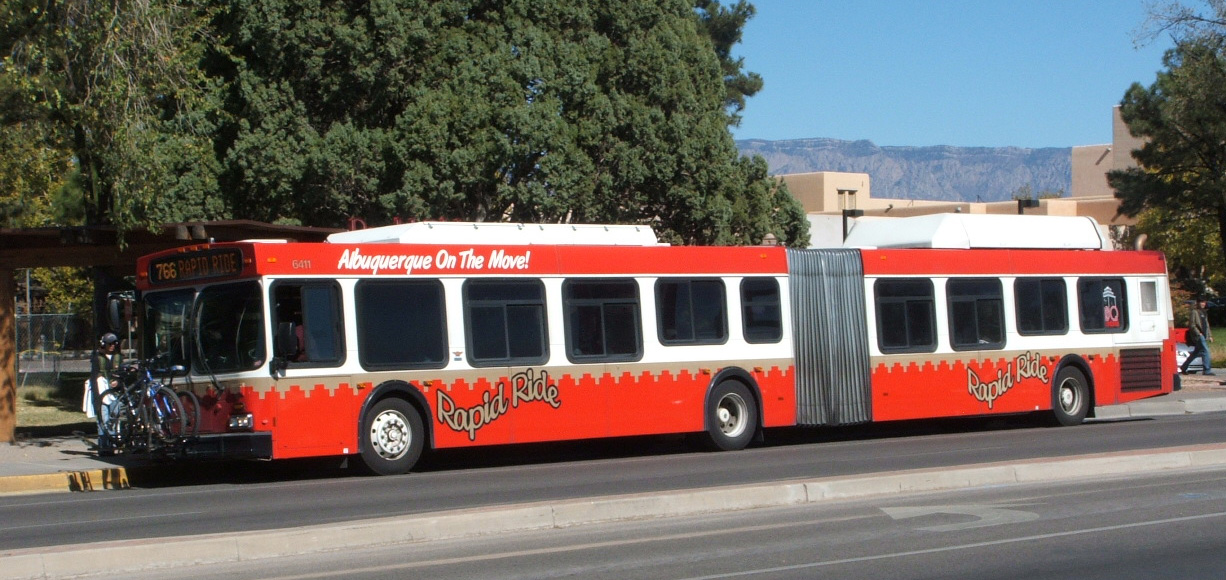
New Flyer DE60LF diesel-electric hybrid in Albuquerque, New Mexico, US.

Although the majority of articulated buses utilise diesel engines for their motive power, a number of operators (primarily outside North America and by LACMTA) have adopted compressed natural gas (CNG) power in order to reduce pollution. Many other transit authorities in the United States and Canada are adopting articulated buses that are diesel-electric hybrids, such as the New Flyer DE60LF. There are also articulated trolleybuses, which use catenary cables to power electric traction motors. Electric articulated trolleybuses principally operate in hilly locations like Mexico City, San Francisco, Seattle, and Vancouver, B.C., where the steep grades preclude the use of combustion engines for motive power.

The New Flyer Xcelsior Charge NG battery-electric articulated buses are equipped with traction motors on both the middle and rear axles; the middle axle uses in-wheel motors.

==== Axles ====
Some buses have a tag axle next to the rear axle, increasing the rated load. Examples include the Mercedes-Benz Citaro CapaCity, MAN Lion's City GXL (A43), Mercedes-Benz O500 DA, BYD D11, and Scania K IA.

=== Multiple articulation ===
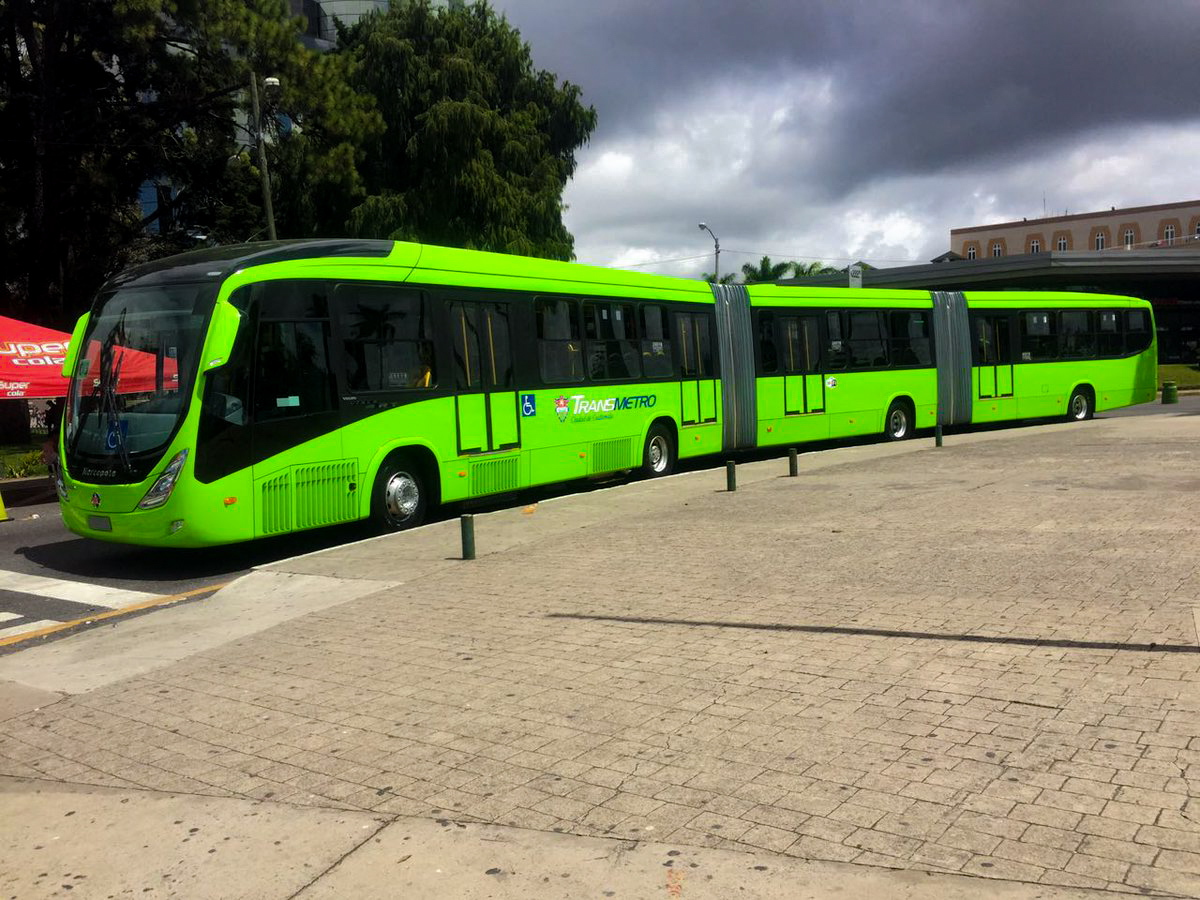
Bi-articulated bus in Guatemala City, Guatemala

Since the late 1980s, the concept of the articulated bus has been extended further with the addition of a second trailer section that extends the bus almost to tram length and capacity, to create a bi-articulated bus, also called a triple bus.

Bi-articulated buses are still rare, having been trialled and rejected in some places. Because of their length they have a role on very high-capacity routes, or as a component of a bus rapid transit scheme. Major examples of bi-articulated buses playing a major role in bus rapid transit can be found in Curitiba, Bogota, Mexico City and Quito. In the Netherlands, bi-articulated buses came into service in Utrecht (2002) and Groningen (2014) on busy routes. In Bratislava, Slovakia some long lines have been running bi-articulated trolleybuses since late 2023.

=== Levels ===
Most articulated buses use a single passenger level or deck.

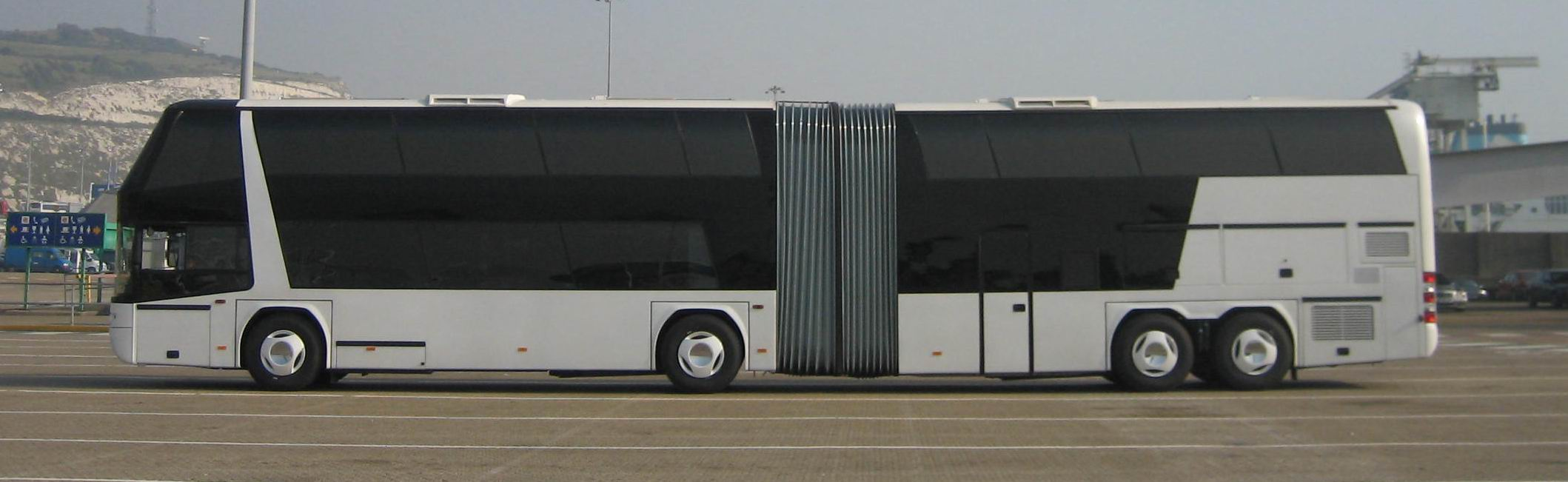
A 1992 (redesigned) Neoplan Jumbocruiser

A few attempts have been made to design a double-decker articulated bus. NEOPLAN Bus GmbH built a handful of Neoplan Jumbocruisers between 1975 and 1992. In these models, only the upper deck allows movement between the two sections, so each section has its own doors and set of stairs.

== Driver licensing ==
In some countries of the European Union, as well as in Canada, an articulated bus can be driven with the same license used to drive a rigid bus (D in Europe), while a bus towing a normal trailer requires a bus + trailer (D+E) license.

In the UK it is only necessary to hold a D licence on articulated buses where the driven axle is in the rear section. As the front cannot be driven without the rear, for licensing purposes they are not considered to have a trailer necessitating the E entitlement. However, special training is needed for bi-articulated buses.

In the United States, in jurisdictions subject to the rules of the Federal Motor Carrier Safety Administration (FMCSA), an articulated motorcoach (bus) driver is required to possess at least a class B CDL.

== Examples of articulated buses ==
- AKSM-213
- AKSM-333
- AKSM-433
- Akia Ultra LF25
- Berkhof Europa 2000A Duvedec
- BYD K11M
- Chavdar B14-20
- Chavdar 141
- Credobus Econell 18 Next
- Credobus Electronell 18
- Crown-Ikarus 286
- BMC Procity 18M
- DAC 117UD
- De Simon IS.2
- Inbus AID 280 FT
- Higer KLQ6186GHEV
- Hyundai Elec City Articulated
- Huanghai DD6140S01
- Huanghai DD6180S01
- Ikarbus IK-5B
- Ikarbus IK-160
- Ikarbus IK-201
- Ikarbus IK-218
- Ikarus 280
- Ikarus 281
- Ikarus 282
- Ikarus 283
- Ikarus 284
- Ikarus 417/435/435T
- Inbus AID 280FT
- Irisbus Citelis 18
- Iveco Urbanway 18
- Jinghua BK6150K
- Jinghua BK6160K
- Jinghua BK6182/BK6182B
- Karosa ŠM16,5
- Karosa B 741
- Karosa B 941
- Karosa B 961
- Karosa C 744
- Karosa C 943
- Leyland-DAB articulated bus
- LAZ-6205
- LAZ-A292
- LiAZ-6212
- LiAZ-6213
- MAN Lion's City G Integral Bus
- MAZ-105
- MAZ-205
- MAZ-215
- MAZ-216
- Mercedes-Benz Citaro G Integral Bus
- Mercedes-Benz O500UA/UDA
- Mercedes-Benz O405G
- Mercedes-Benz Conecto G
- NABI BRT
- NABI LFW
- NABI SFW
- Neobus 405 GZ
- Neobus Citta LEA
- Neoplan AN460
- Neoplan Centroliner
- Neoplan Jumbocruiser N138-4
- New Flyer Xcelsior
- Nova Bus LFS Artic
- Orion-Ikarus 286
- Otokar Kent C Articulated
- Otokar Kent XL
- Prevost H5-60
- Renault PR180.2
- Rocar DAC 217E
- Sanos S 200
- Scania Citywide LF Articulated
- Škoda 15Tr
- Škoda 25Tr Irisbus
- Škoda 27Tr Solaris
- Škoda 31Tr SOR
- Škoda 33Tr SOR
- Škoda 35Tr Iveco
- Škoda 706 RTO-K
- Solaris Urbino 18
- SOR NB 18
- SOR NS 18
- TAM 260A180 M
- TAM 272A180 M
- TEDOM C 18
- Van Hool AG300
- Volvo 7700
- Volvo 7900
- Volvo 8700LEA
- Volvo B5LH Articulated
- Volvo B7LA
- Volvo B8RLE Articulated
- Volvo B9L Articulated
- Volvo B9S
- Volvo B10LA
- Volvo B10M Articulated
- Volvo B12BLE Articulated
- VDL Citea SLFA
- Wright Eclipse Fusion
- Wright Solar Fusion
- Yutong ZK6180HGA
- Yutong ZK6180HGH
- Zhongtong N18
- ZiU-6205 (also known as ZiU-10 or ZiU-683)

== See also ==
- List of buses
- List of bus operating companies
