= Ikarus 280 =

Hungarian articulated bus

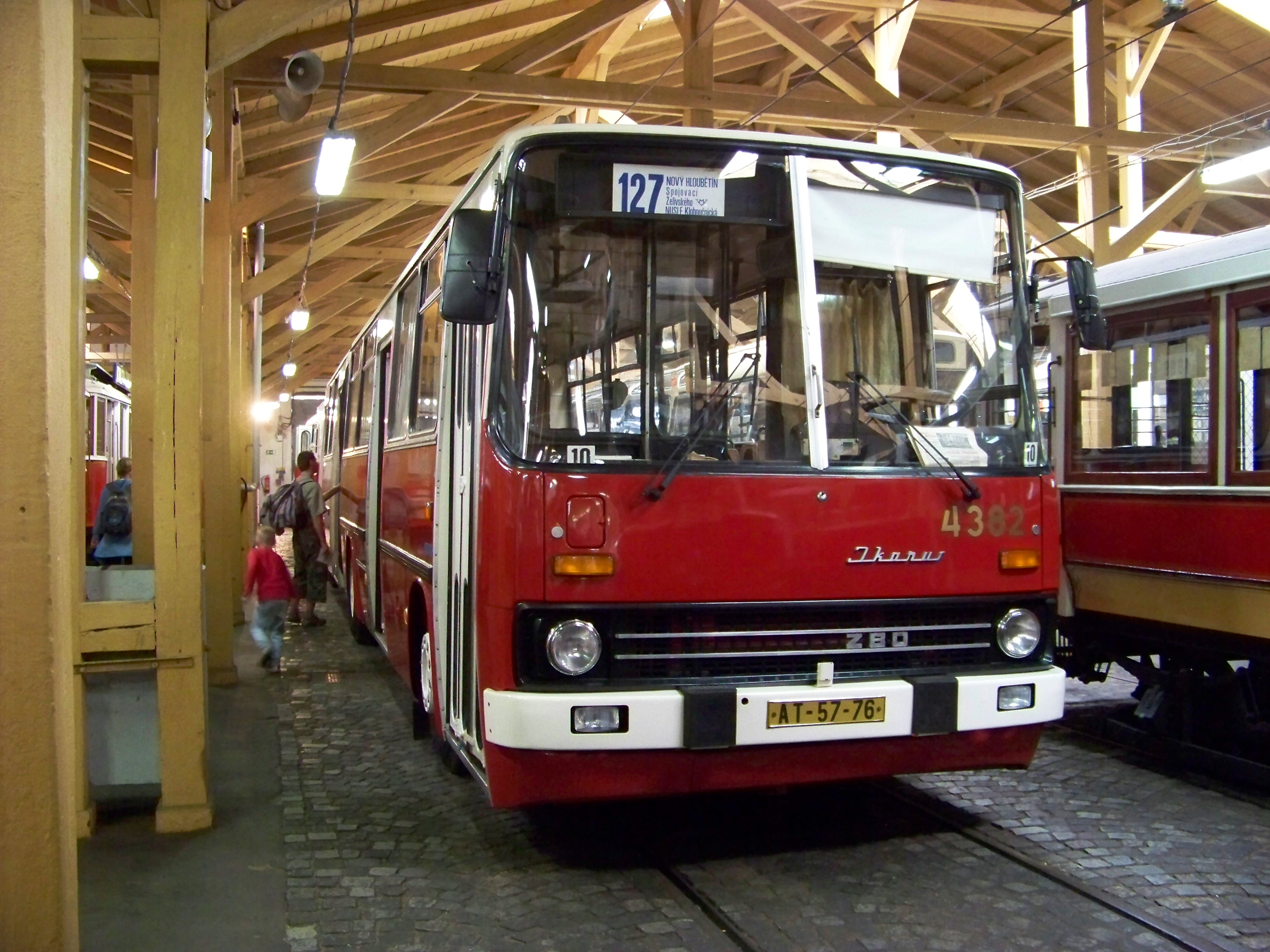
- Preserved Ikarus 280 at the Public Transport Museum, Prague in September 2013

Overview
- Manufacturer: Ikarus

Body and chassis
- Doors: 2 (Ikarus 280.10) to 4 (Ikarus 280.08)
- Floor type: High-floor
- Chassis: Semi-self-supporting with frame, inspired by VöV-1 design
- Related: Ikarus 256; Ikarus 260; Ikarus 293; Ikarus C80

Powertrain
- Engine: Straight-six Diesel engines: Rába-MAN D2156; Rába-MAN D2356; MAN D2866; Rába D10
- Capacity: 93-160, depending on the door formula and seating arrangement
- Power output: 141–184 kW (189–247 hp)
- Transmission: Csepel ZF 6-speed manual Csepel HAFO 6-speed manual Praga 2M70 2-speed automatic Voith DIWA; ZF Ecomat 4HP and 5HP

Dimensions
- Length: 16,500 mm (54 ft 1 5/8 in)
- Width: 2,500 mm (8 ft 2 3/8 in)
- Height: 3,165 mm (10 ft 4 5/8 in)
- Curb weight: 12,580 kg (27,730 lb)

Chronology
- Predecessor: Ikarus 180
- Successor: Ikarus 417 and his Ikarus 435

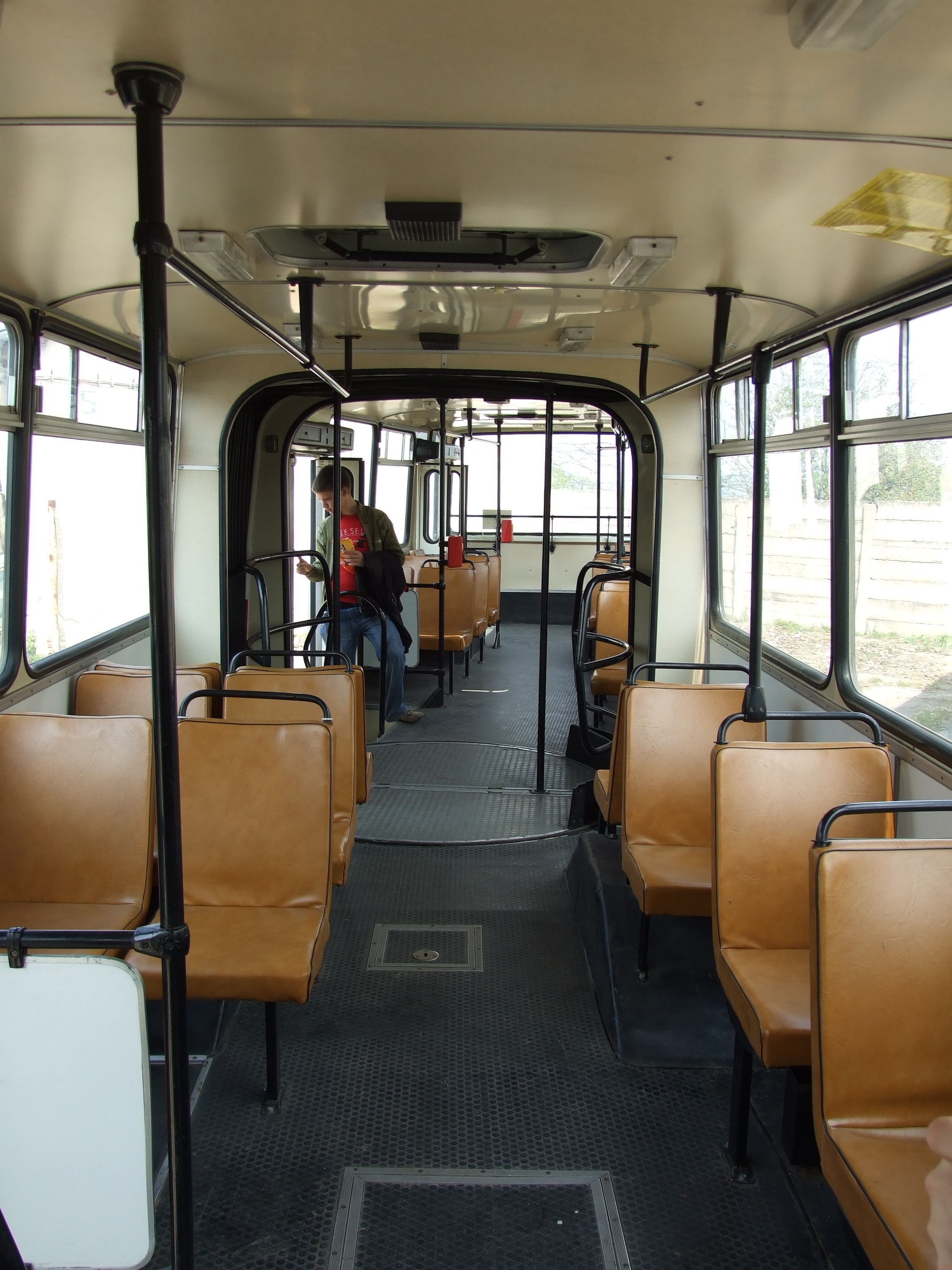
Interior of Ikarus 280

Ikarus 280 was an articulated bus produced by Hungarian bus manufacturer Ikarus from 1973 to 2002. It was succeeded by the Ikarus 435 in 1985.

== Construction features ==
The Ikarus 280 is a model of the Ikarus 200 series. It is made of two rigid sections linked by a pivoting joint. The body is a semi-self-supporting body with a frame, the Raba-MAN D2156 inline-6 diesel engine is mounted in the front section. (Note: Different batches with different engines also exist.) It powers the middle axle, meaning that the bus has puller configuration. All three axles are air-sprung beam axles with additional telescopic shock absorbers. Both rear and middle axles were made by Rába, while the front axle was made by LiAZ. (Note: Different batches with different axles also exist) Either an automatic or a manual gearbox was installed that allowed a top speed of 65 to 90 kilometres per hour (40 to 56 mph). The manual gearboxes came in either five- or six-speed configuration, and were mated with a dry single-disc clutch. The Ikarus 280 has a pneumatic braking system, a spring loaded parking brake, and an exhaust brake. The steering is hydraulically assisted. The buses, in actual applications, have a minimum of 26 seats, and space for up to 134 additional standing passengers. (Note: This capacity corresponds to approximately seven standing passengers per square metre (or one per square feet))

== Production and operation ==
Production started in 1973 and ended in 2002. The 280 was based on the Ikarus 200 platform and had many variants produced. Currently (2020), the number of Ikarus 280 buses in active service is declining, due to supply of new low-floor buses. The articulated buses 281(RHD), 282 and 283 (18 m (59 ft)-versions), 284 (pusher configuration), C80, C83, the articulated trolleybuses Ikarus 280T, 283T, 284T and the double articulated Ikarus 293 were based on the Ikarus 280.

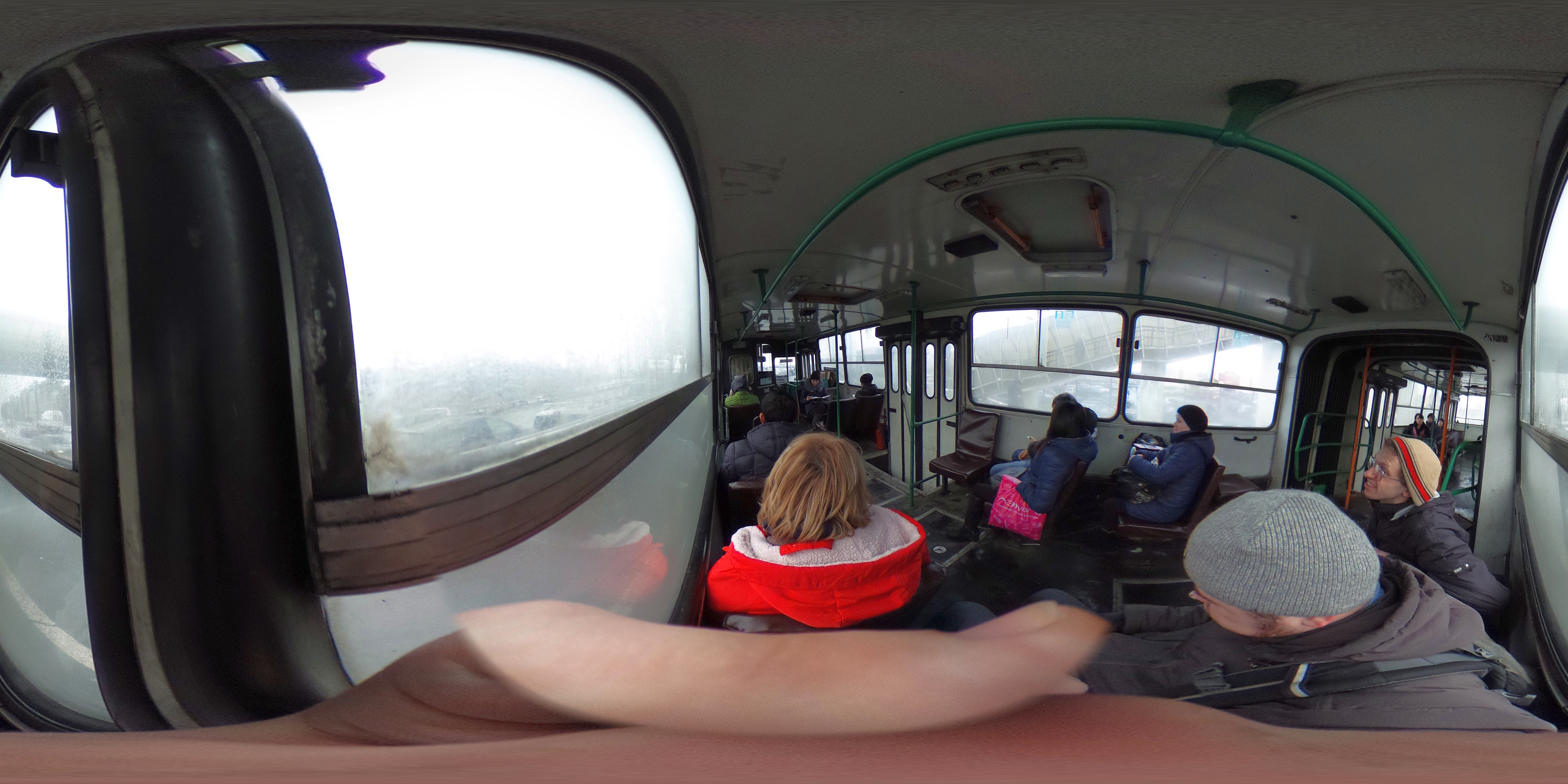
Spherical panorama of Ikarus 280 bus interior in Moscow (view as a 360° interactive panorama)

== Ikarus C80 ==
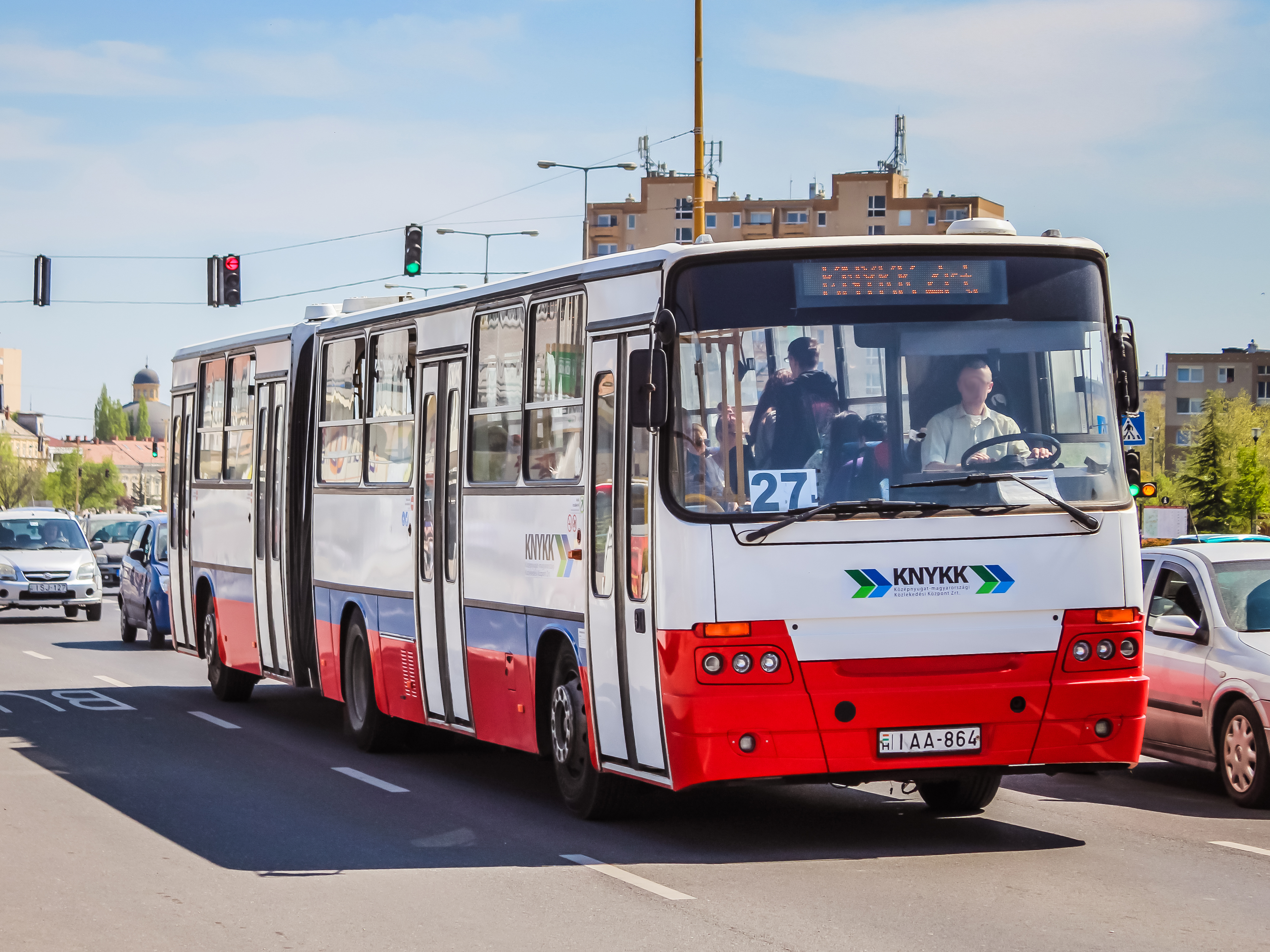
Urban sub-model C80 serving Line 27 in Székesfehérvár in its original Alba Volán colors, 2018

Ikarus C80 is a limited-run reproduction of Ikarus 280 in the 2000s. It is slightly different from the original model with modernized engines and a striking facelift that can be easily identified by the single-piece windshield used. While both urban and suburban models exist, all were purchased by the Hungarian suburban bus company Volánbusz and its county based predecessors.

Ikarus C80 subtypes
Subtype	Engine	Gearbox
C80.30A	Rába D10 UTSLL	ZF 4HP 500/Voith-Diwa 851.3
C80.30M	Rába D10 UTSLL	ZF S6-120U
C80.33	Rába D10 UTSLL	ZF S6-120U/ZF 4HP 500/Voith-Diwa 851.3
C80.40A	Rába D10 UTSLL	ZF 4HP 500/Voith-Diwa 851.3
C80.40M	Rába D10 UTSLL	ZF S6-120U

== See also ==
- List of buses
