= Ikarus 180 =

Hungarian articulated bus

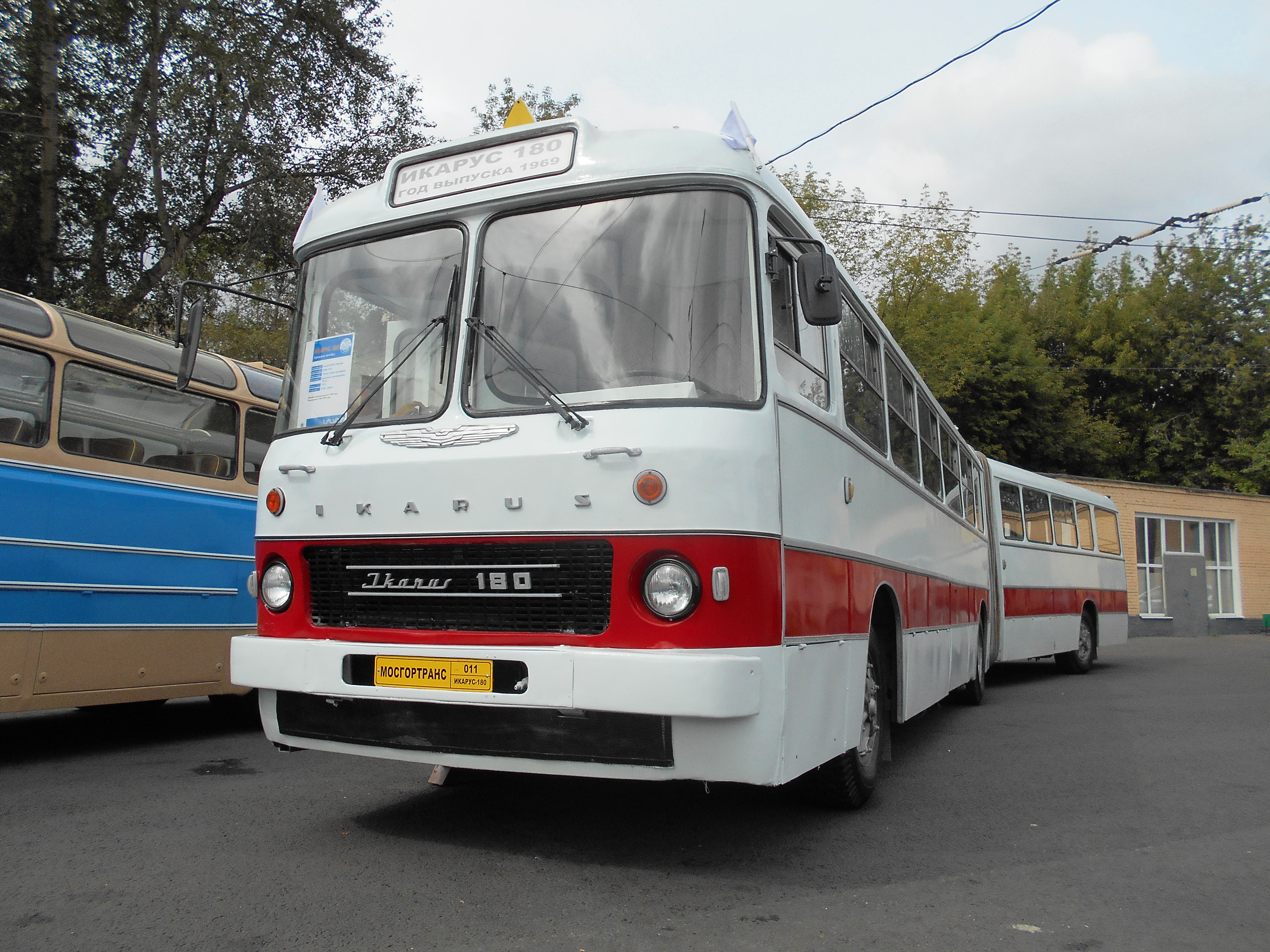
- A restored Ikarus 180 in Moscow, Russia

Overview
- Manufacturer: Ikarus Autobuszgyár
- Also called: Ikarus Bus 180 Ikarus Autobuszgyár 180
- Production: 1966
- Model years: 1966 - 1973

Body and chassis
- Class: City bus
- Body style: Articulated bus
- Related: Ikarus 556

Chronology
- Successor: Ikarus 280

The Ikarus 180 is a three-axle articulated bus from the Hungarian bus manufacturer Ikarus. It was produced in Budapest-Mátyásföld from 1966 to 1973.

== Gallery ==
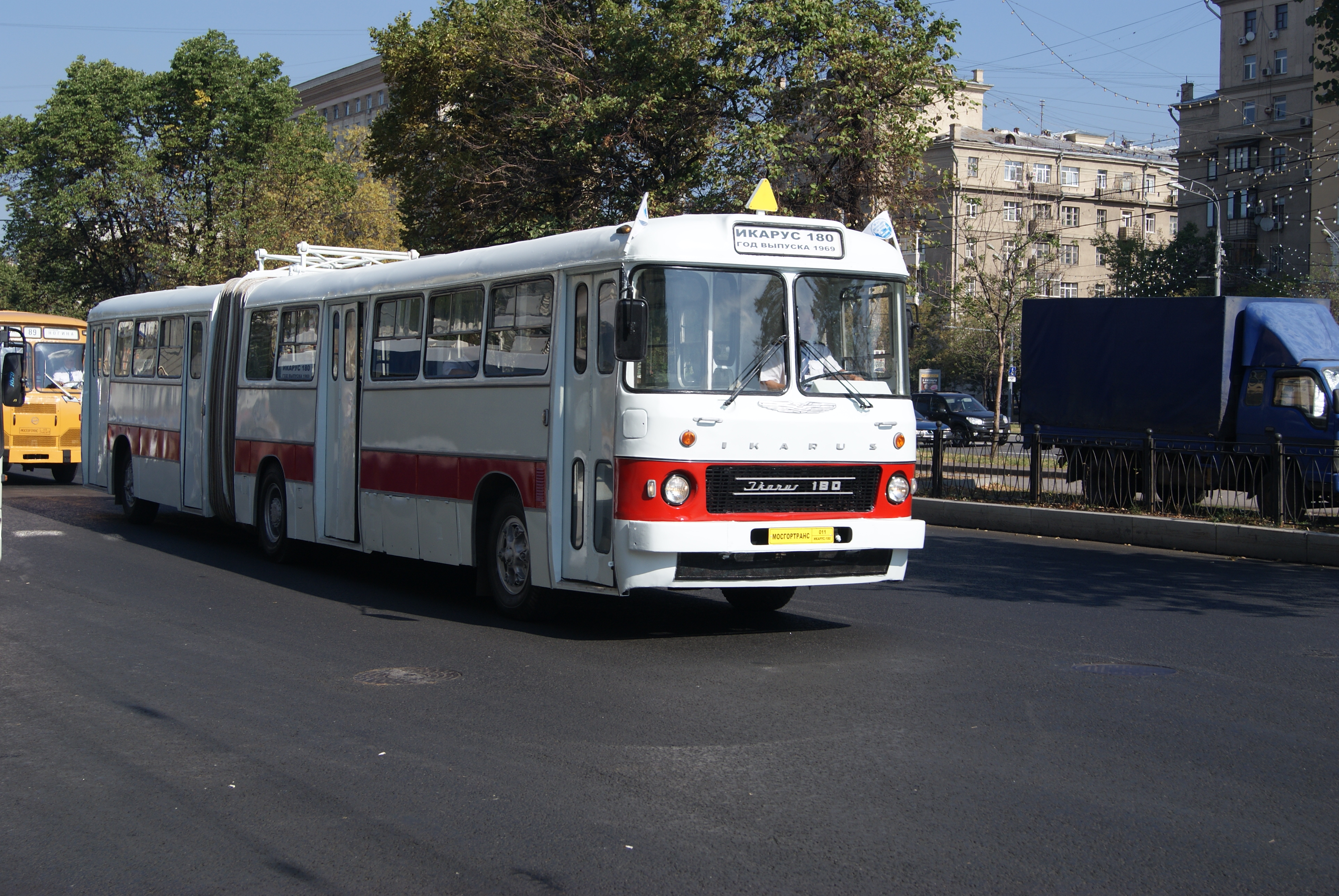
A Ikarus 180 in Moscow, Russia

In Moscow Transport Museum.

== Sources ==
- Martin, Harák (2013-11-27). Autobusy a trolejbusy východního bloku [Eastern Bloc buses and trolleybuses] (in Czech). Grada Publishing a.s. p. 119. ISBN 978-80-247-8906-4.
- Novoe v zhizni, nauke, tekhnike: Serii︠a︡ Transport (in Russian). Znanie. 1976. pp. 46–47.
