= Škoda 31Tr SOR =

Low-floor articulated trolleybus produced by Škoda Transportation

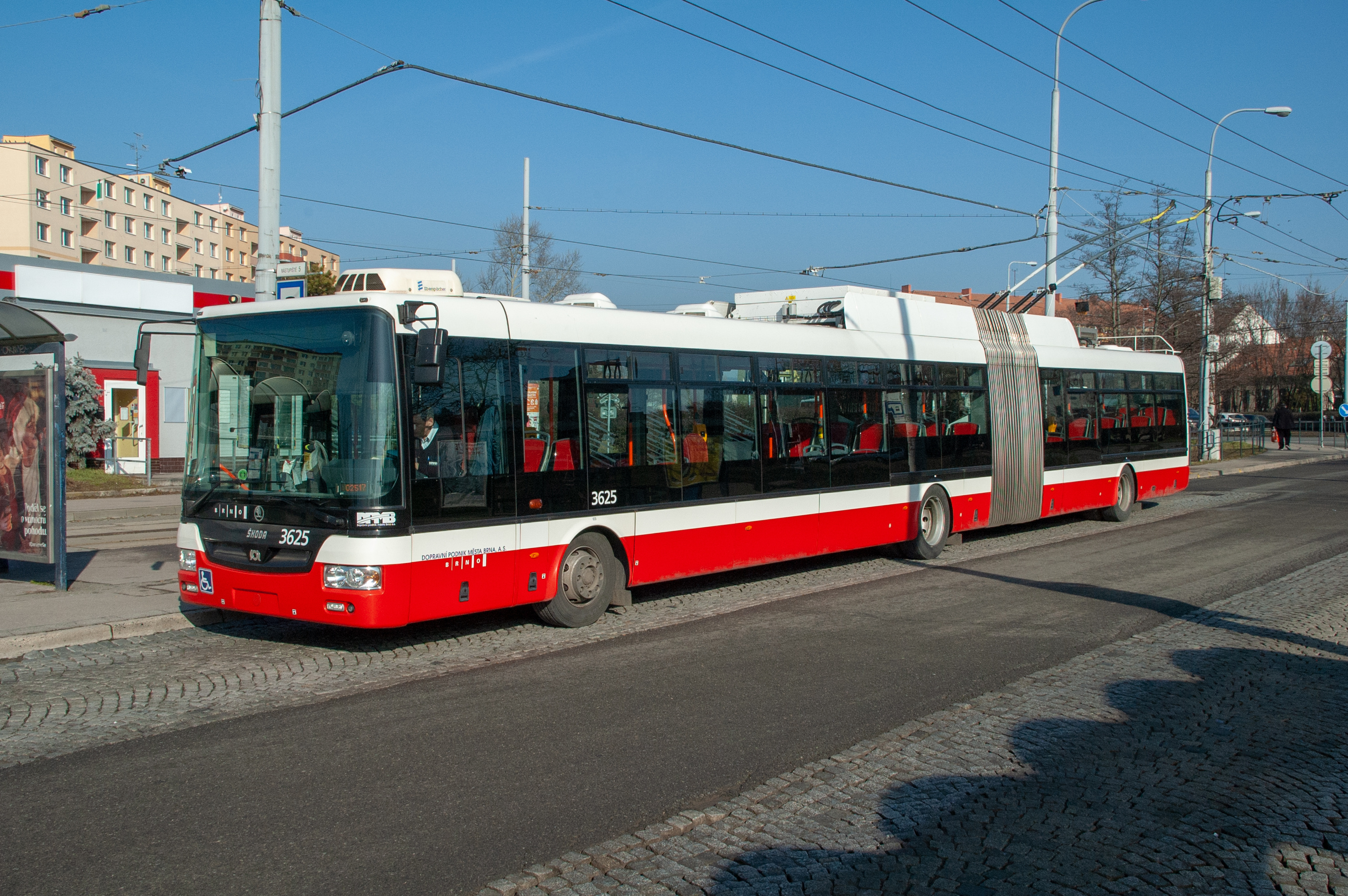
- Škoda 31Tr SOR in Brno, Czech Republic

Overview
- Manufacturer: SOR; Škoda Transportation

Body and chassis
- Doors: 5
- Floor type: low-floor

Powertrain
- Engine: Škoda 2ML 3846 K/6
- Capacity: 52 sitting 111 standing
- Power output: 1 × 250 kW (340 hp)

Dimensions
- Length: 18,750 mm (61 ft 6 1/4 in)
- Width: 2,550 mm (8 ft 4 3/8 in)
- Height: 2,900 mm (9 ft 6 1/8 in)
- Curb weight: 16,000 kg (35,000 lb)

Škoda 31Tr SOR is a low-floor articulated trolleybus produced in cooperation with Škoda Transportation (electrical equipment and assembly) and SOR, which supplies the body based on the bus SOR NB 18.

== Construction features ==
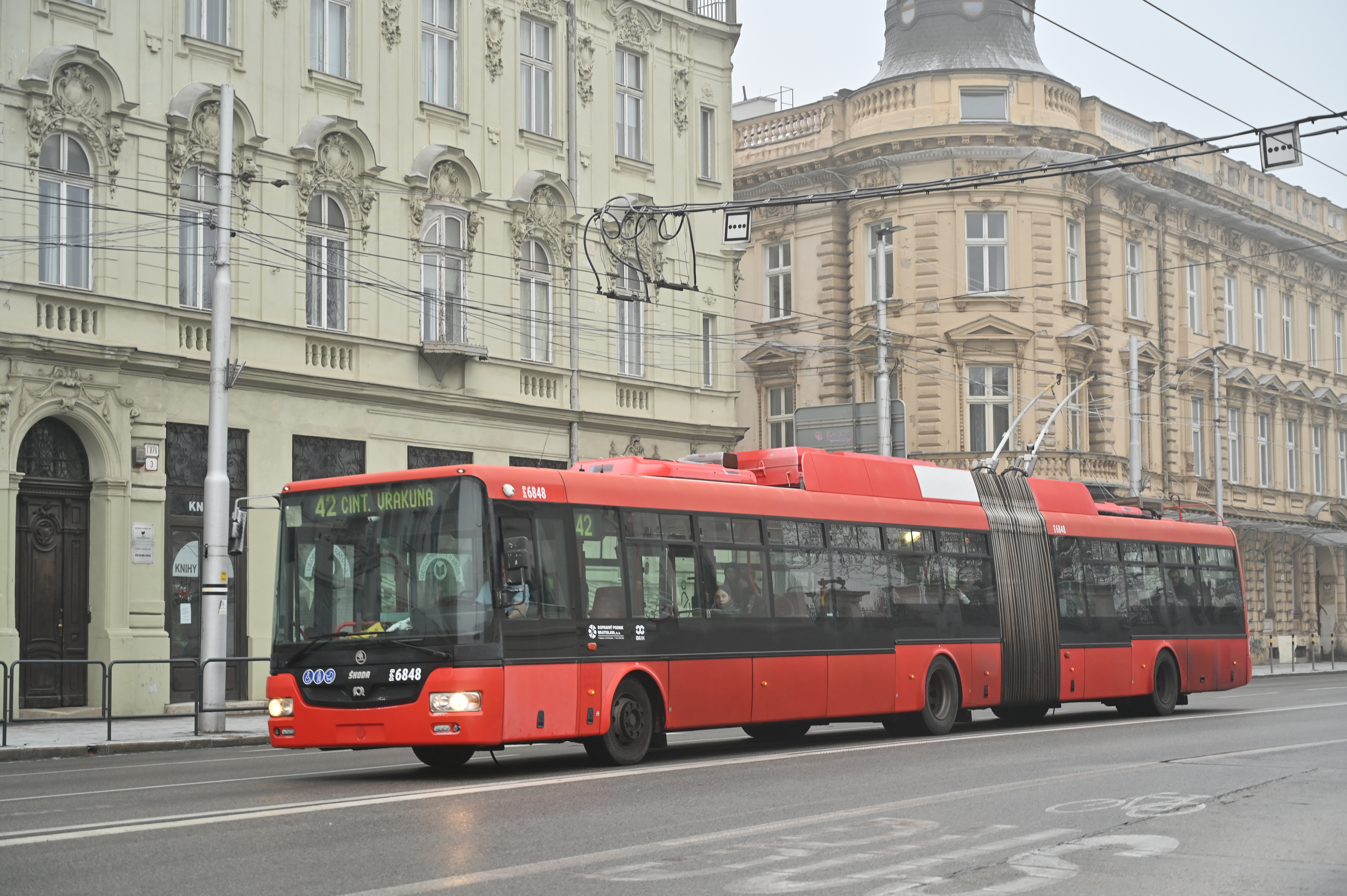
Škoda 31Tr SOR trolleybus in Bratislava (2024)

31Tr is derived from SOR NB 18 city bus. It is made of two rigid sections linked by a pivoting joint. Electric motor is located in the rear of the bus. Inside are used plastic Ster seats. Rear axle is VOITH brand, as well as medium axle, the front axle is own production with independent wheel suspension. Only rear C axle is propulsed. Body of the vehicle is welded from steel-voltage profiles, flashings from the outside and interior are lined with plastic sheeting. The floor of the bus is at a height of 360 mm above the ground. On the right side of the bus are five doors (first are narrower than other doors).

== Production and operation ==
Production started in 2011. In Czech and Slovak cities they replaced old high-floor trolleybuses Škoda 15Tr

Country	City	Year	Amount	Reference
Czech Republic	Brno	2015	30	
Czech Republic	Hradec Králové	2011–2013	13	
Slovakia	Banská Bystrica	2015	3	
Slovakia	Bratislava	2014–2015	70	
Slovakia	Prešov	2011–2020	25	
Slovakia	Žilina	2012–2013	8	
