= Škoda 33Tr SOR =

Low-floor articulated trolleybus produced by Škoda Transportation

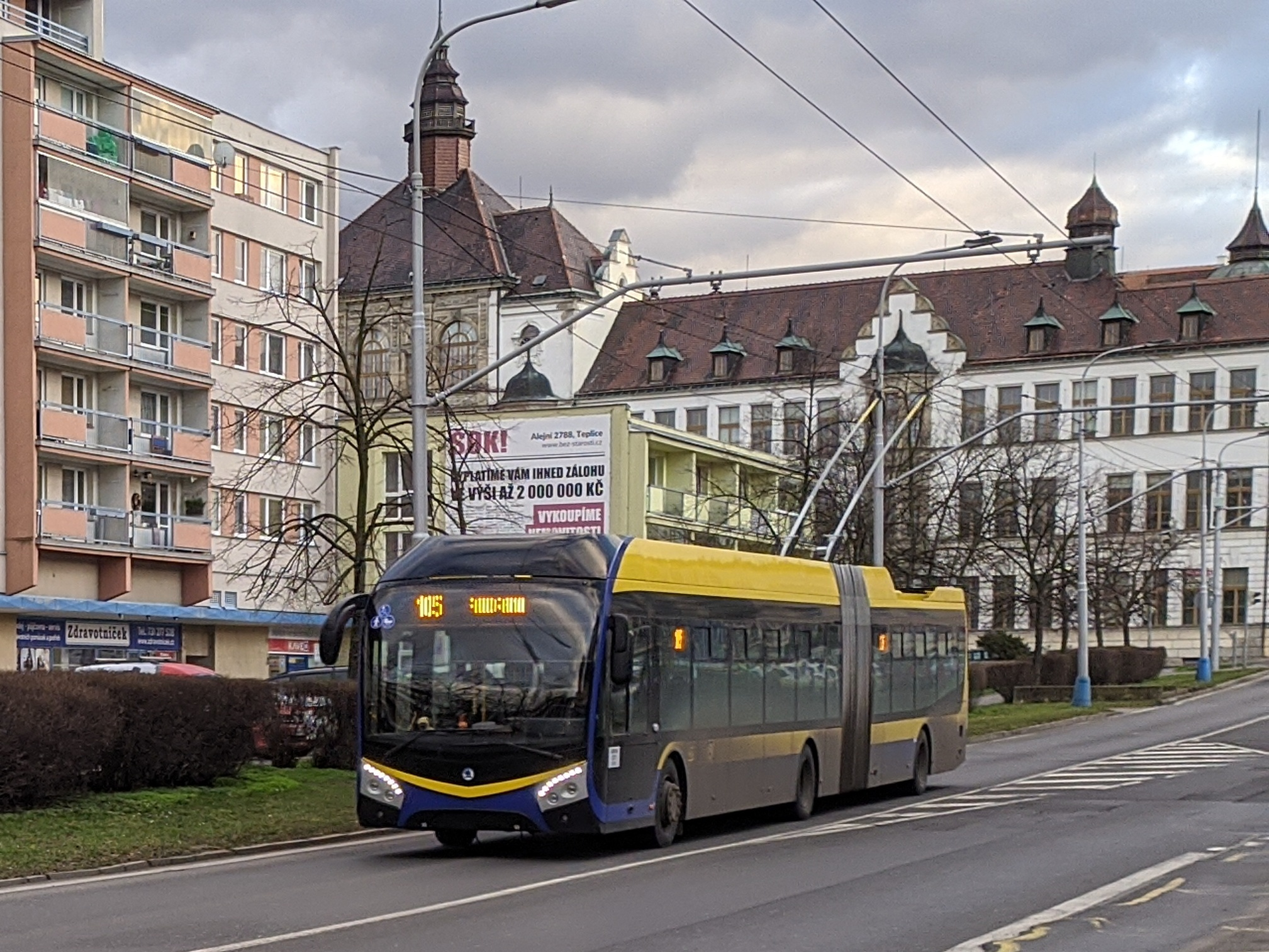
- Škoda 33Tr SOR in Teplice, Czech Republic

Overview
- Manufacturer: SOR; Škoda Transportation

Body and chassis
- Doors: 3 or 4
- Floor type: low-floor

Powertrain
- Engine: Škoda 2ML 3846 K/6
- Capacity: 47 sitting 73 standing
- Power output: 1 × 240 kW (320 hp)

Dimensions
- Length: 18,750 mm (61 ft 6 1/4 in)
- Width: 2,550 mm (8 ft 4 3/8 in)
- Height: 3,400 mm (11 ft 1 7/8 in)
- Curb weight: 16,000 kg (35,000 lb)

Škoda 33Tr SOR is a low-floor articulated trolleybus produced in cooperation of Škoda Transportation (electrical equipment and assembly) and SOR, which supplies the body based on the bus SOR NS 18.

== Construction features ==
33Tr is derived from SOR NS 18 city bus. It is made of two rigid sections linked by a pivoting joint. Electric motor is located in the rear of the bus. Inside are used plastic Ster seats. Rear axle is VOITH brand, as well as medium axle, the front axle is own production with independent wheel suspension. Only rear C axle is propulsed. Body of the vehicle is welded from steel-voltage profiles, flashings from the outside and interior are lined with plastic sheeting. The floor of the bus is at a height of 340 mm (13 in) above the ground. On the right side of the bus are four doors.

== Production and operation ==
Production started in 2019. In Czech and Slovak cities they replaced old high-floor trolleybuses Škoda 15Tr. Teplice became the first to operate these trolleybuses.

| Country | City | Year | Amount | Reference |
|---|---|---|---|---|
| Czech Republic | Teplice | 2019 | 1 | |
| Czech Republic | České Budějovice | 2025 | 35 | |
| Estonia | Tallinn | 2026 | 22 | |
| Germany | Esslingen am Neckar | 2026 | 42 | |
