= Public transport in Bratislava =

Public transport in Bratislava is managed by Dopravný podnik Bratislava, a city-owned company. The transport system is known as Mestská hromadná doprava (MHD, Municipal Mass Transit), and the network is the largest in Slovakia. The history of public transportation in Bratislava began with the opening of the first tram route in 1895, when the city was in the Kingdom of Hungary, part of the Austro-Hungarian empire. Passengers must buy their tickets before entering the vehicle. Revenue from tickets covers approximately 40% of expenses, with the other 60% paid by the city.

== History ==
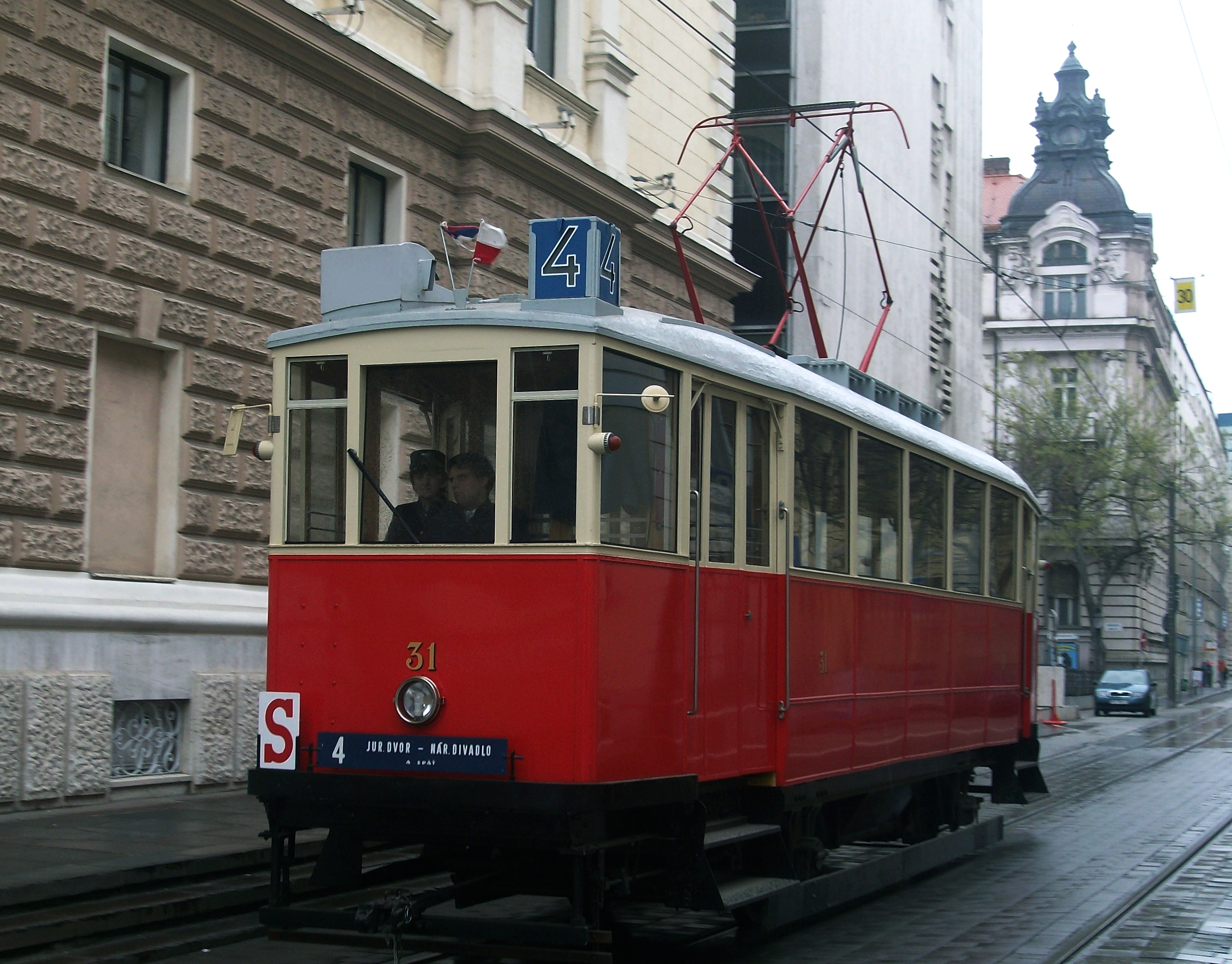
Historical tram on line

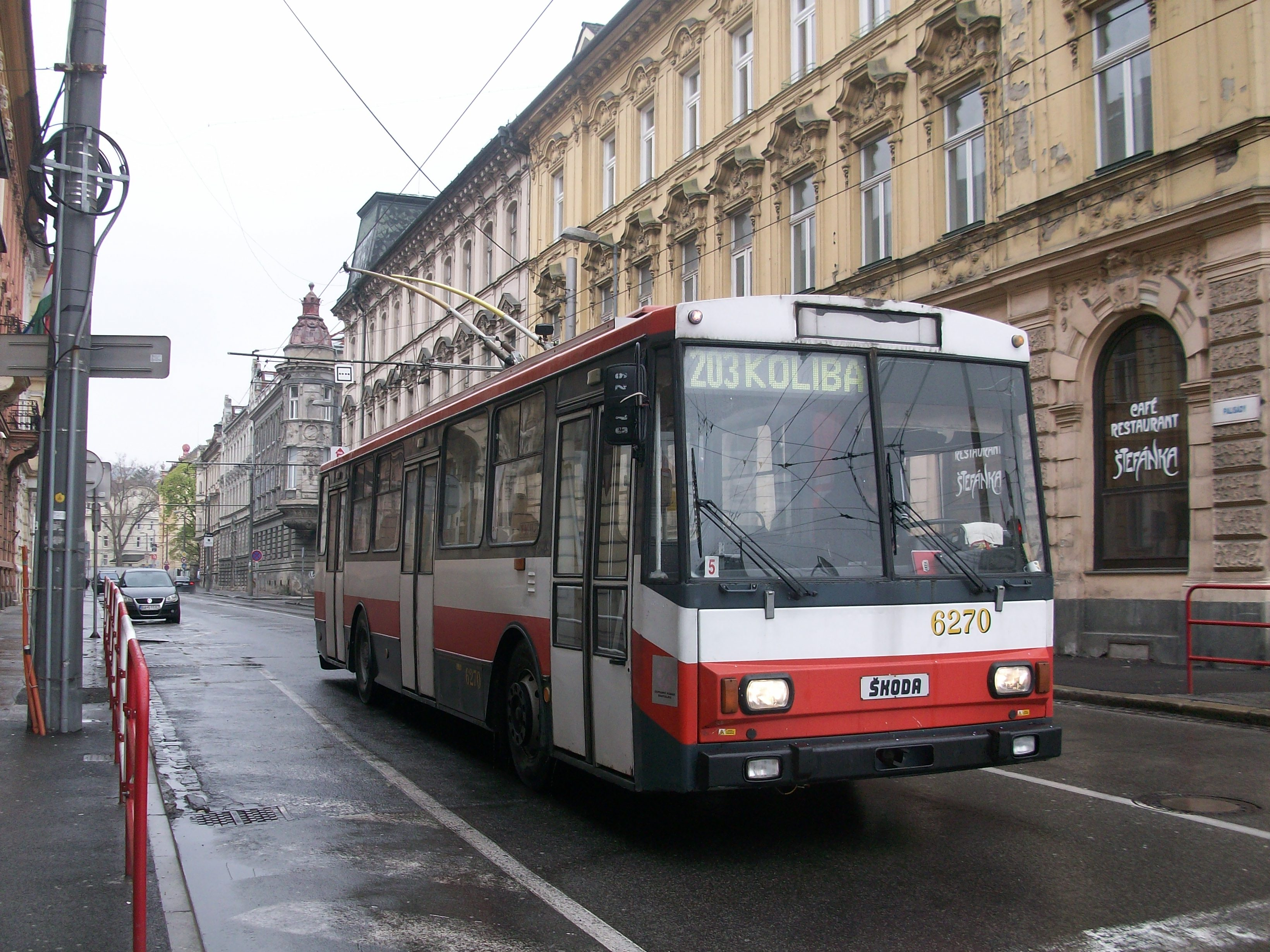
Historical trolleybus Škoda 14Tr on line is going to Koliba

At the end of the 19th century, Bratislava (then Pozsony in Hungarian and Pressburg in German) was still suffering after losing its status as the capital of the Kingdom of Hungary. Now merely a provincial city of middling political and economic importance, its development lagged behind its European neighbours. The main means of transport at this time was horse-drawn and later steam-powered tramways.

In 1868, buses appeared in the city, but they could not meet the demands for transport. On 23 March 1881 an engineer from Vienna, Nicolaus Markovits, submitted a project plan for a city horse-driven railway in Bratislava to the directors of the Hungarian royal state railways. Its route was from the Danube riverbank through the city to the Austrian state railway station. It was supposed to be connected to the Bratislava – Trnava wagonway, belonging to the Hungarian royal state railways.

In the 1990s, traffic jams became a routine occurrence in Bratislava, with public transport vehicles becoming stuck at places like Patrónka or Prístavný most. A major contributing factor was the lack of a ring road, which today consists of parts of the D1 and D2 motorways in Bratislava. While two crucial bridges over the river Danube, Prístavný most and Lafranconi bridge, partially opened in 1983 and 1990 respectively, it was not until 2002 that the Prievoz viaduct on the D1 motorway opened, the D1 part Viedenská – Prístavný most was finished in 2005 and the Sitina Tunnel completed the ring in 2007.

== Description ==
The system uses three main types of vehicles: buses, trams and trolleybuses. Buses cover almost the entire city and go to the most remote boroughs and areas, with 70 daily routes, 20 night routes and other routes on certain occasions.

=== Trams ===
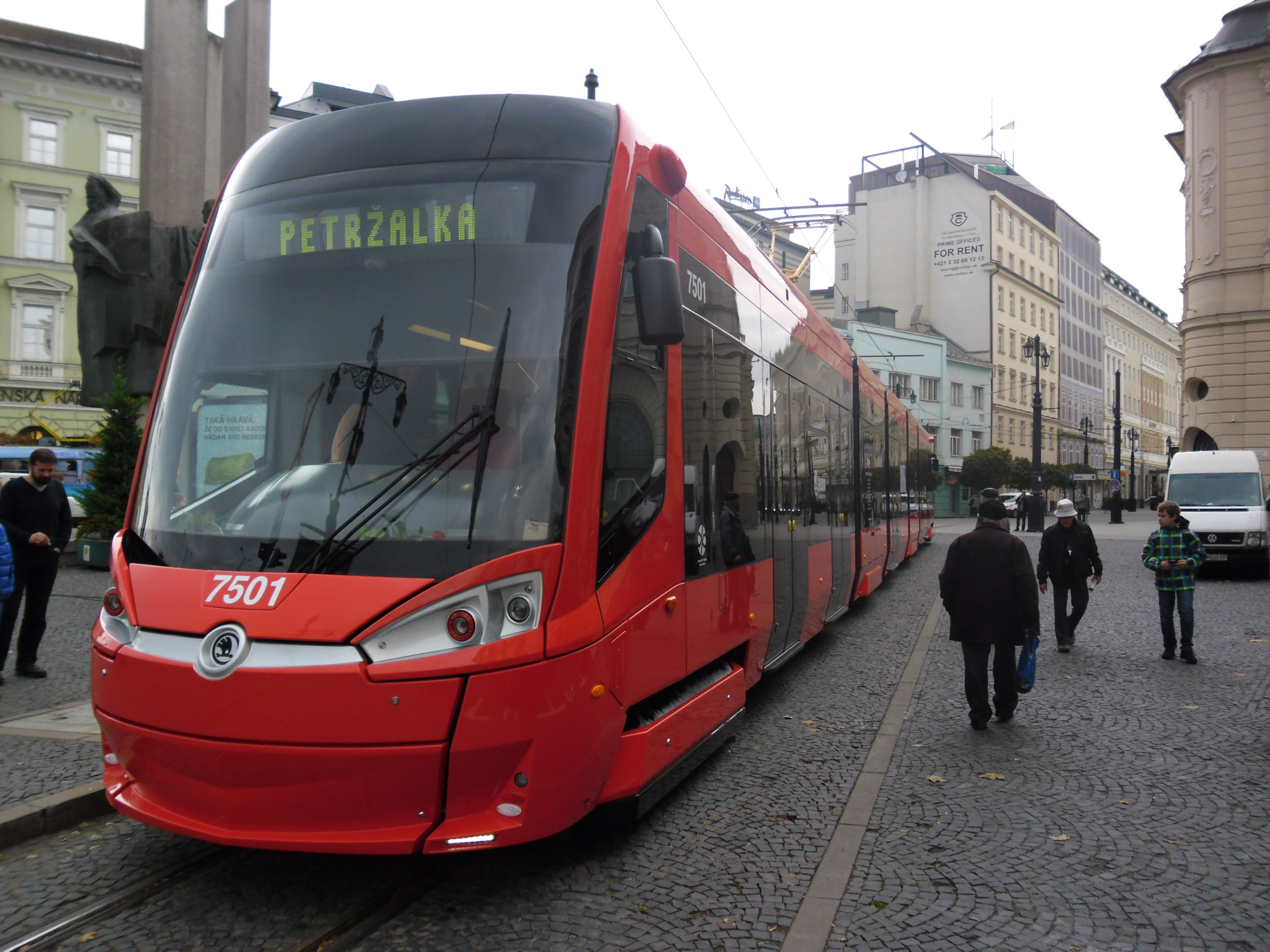
A typical red tram Škoda 30T in Ľudovít Štúr Square in Bratislava

Bratislava tram network

=== Trolleybuses ===
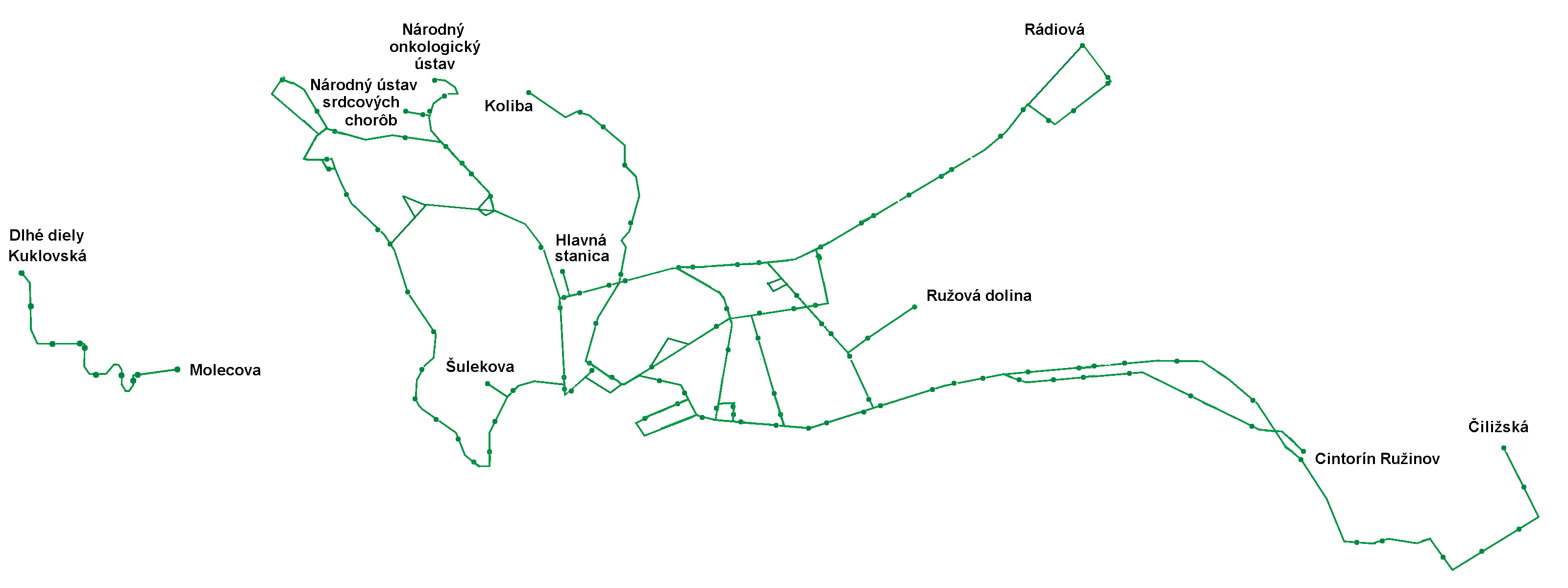
Bratislava trolleybus network

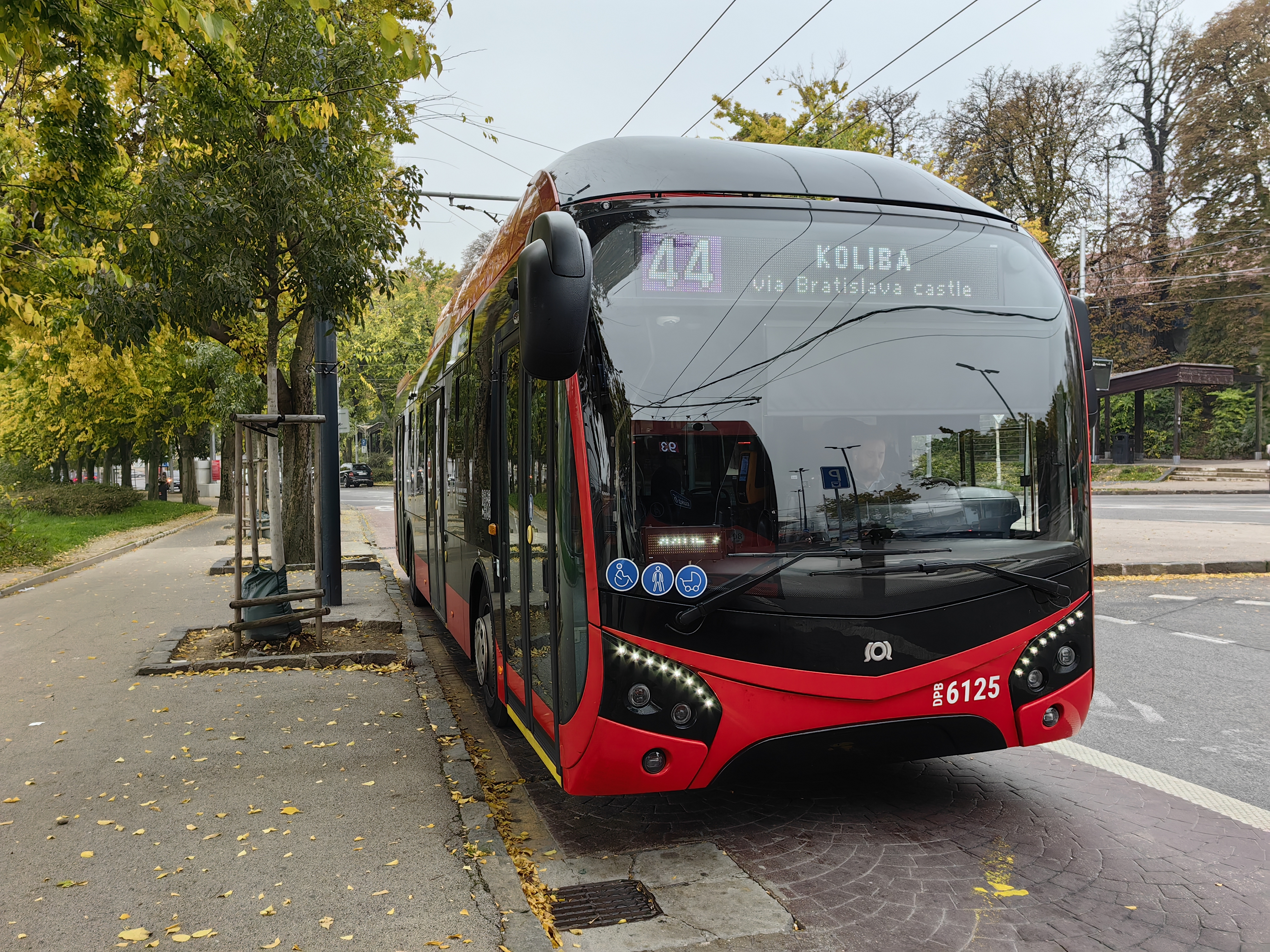
Trolleybus SOR TNS 12 on line towards the Koliba disctrict

The first trolleybus service in Bratislava was established 19 July 1909; thus it is the second oldest such system in the country after the one in the High Tatras. This first line ran from the Roth bullet factory on Pražská Street to Vydrica Valley. Its total length was 5,800 metres (3.6 mi) and it was served by seven vehicles. Due to technical and financial difficulties, the service on this line was terminated after six years, in 1915. In the period between the world wars, Bratislava was left without a trolleybus system. The first talks about its restoration began just before the Second World War.

Trolleybuses returned to the city on 31 July 1941. Line M connected the Slovak National Theatre and Bratislava main railway station. In 1951, the first Škoda 7Tr trolleybuses appeared. In 1953, trolleybuses reached Trnavské mýto, and two years later began serving Šafárikovo námestie. Most of the current trolleybus infrastructure was built before 1960. Afterwards, buses started to be preferred in Bratislava. Many trolleybus lines were shortened or closed altogether. After the 1970s energy crisis, the importance of trolleybuses increased somewhat. New lines were built and new vehicles were bought. In 1982, the Škoda 14Tr appeared in the city. Between 1960 and 1990 there were about ten routes (210 – 220).

During the 1990s, Škoda 15Tr trolleybuses appeared, and replaced the Škoda Sanos vehicles. In 1999, a new line to Národný ústav srdcových chorôb (NÚSCH) and Národný onkologický ústav was opened. The last line to be opened was a short section from the Patrónka junction to the Vojenská nemocnica built in 2013.

Most of the trolleybus services are now covered by new Škoda 30Tr and Škoda 31Tr trolleybuses delivered between 2013 and 2015.

=== Buses ===
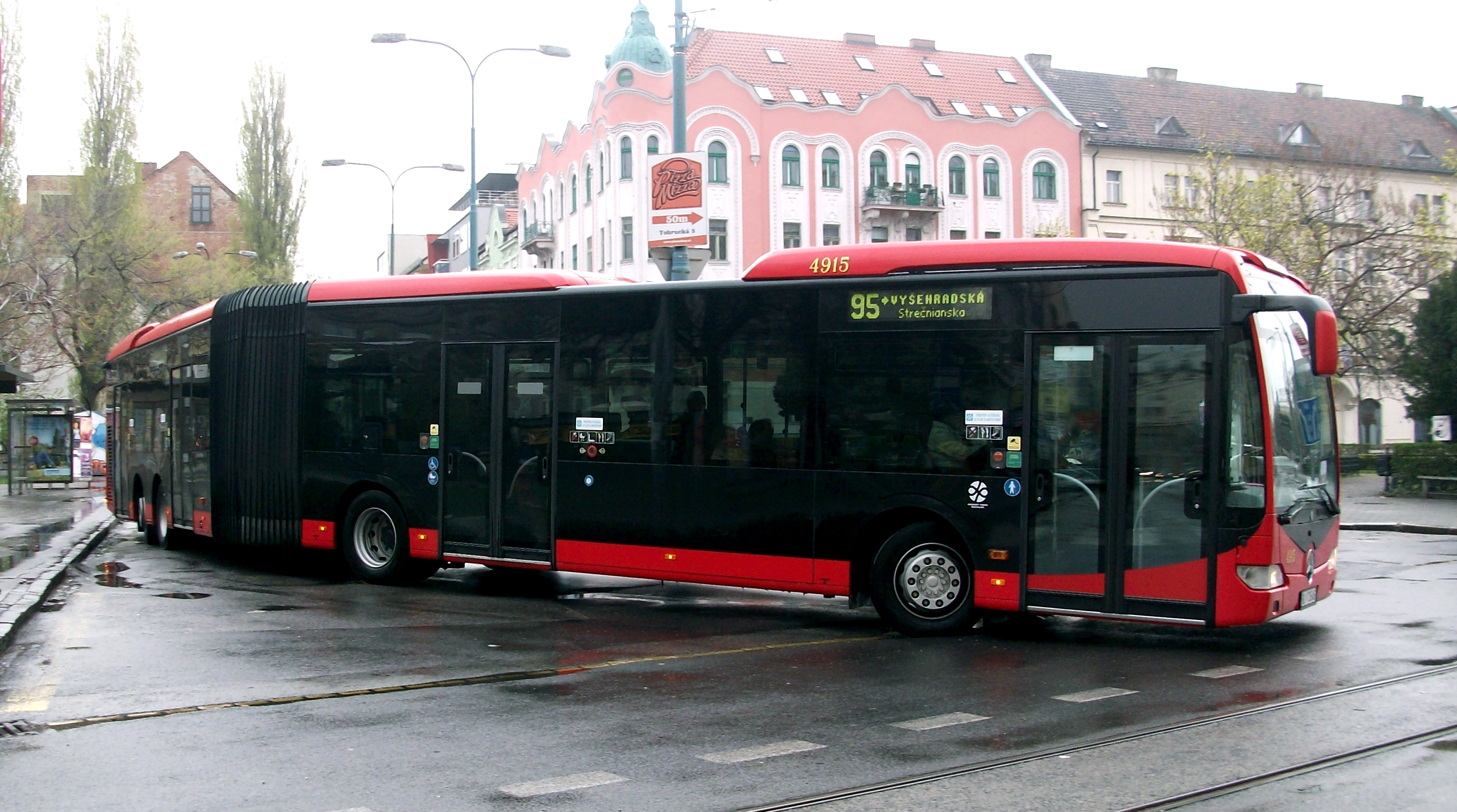
Bus line leaves Šafárik square (Slovak: Šafárikovo nám.) bus stop in Bratislava

DPB operates 20 night routes between the hours of 23:30 and 03:30 (Mon-Sun). Fares are the same at night as during the day. The central transfer hub is Central Station and the sub-link transfer hub is Hodžovo Square. The basic interval of night services is 60 minutes, which is reduced to 30 minutes at certain times. DPB offer additional late night services during certain holidays, such as New Year's Eve.

== Ticketing ==
Single tickets are available at pre-sale points such as newsstands, ticket machines and DPB offices and customer has to validate them in stamping machine on board the vehicle at the beginning of his journey. Customers can choose between the 30-minute tickets (€0.90), or the 60-minute tickets (€1.20). All tickets are transferable. A 50% discount is offered to children, students, pensioners, while some other groups of customers such as passengers over 70 years can travel for free. These tickets are valid on all DPB lines within Slovakia, including night services (N21-N99). Prepaid tickets and free travel for certain groups of passengers apply on night routes as well. Tickets can't be bought on board.

So called tourist tickets are available with validity of 24 hours, 48 hours, 72 hours or 168 hours. Tickets can be purchased at ticket machines, DPB offices and other pre-sale points such as hotels or tourist agencies with prices ranging from €4.50 for 24 hours ticket to €15.00 for one week ticket. These tickets are issued on a same stock as single tickets and must be validated at the beginning of the first journey. No discounts are available. Tickets are valid on DPB service within Bratislava (fare zones 100 and 101), including night services.

SMS tickets are available to customers of Slovak mobile providers. SMS tickets can only be used on DPB services within the city of Bratislava, including night services, and are offered in three types: a 40-minutes ticket for €1.20, a 70-minutes ticket for €1.80 or a 24-hours ticket for €5.40.

Travelcards are available for 7, 30, 90 or 365 days and are issued within Integrovaný dopravný systém v Bratislavskom kraji (IDS BK; literally Integrated transit system of Bratislava region) and therefore are valid not only on DPB services but also on regional buses of Slovak Lines and regional trains of Železničná spoločnosť Slovensko. When purchasing an IDS BK travelcard, the passenger can choose its territorial validity – for this purpose the area of IDS BK is split into fare zones. The price is calculated based on the number of fare zones purchased. Travelcards are valid also on night services.

To purchase an IDS BK travelcard the customer needs a smartcard accepted by IDS BK operators. These are smartcards issued by DPB, Slovak Lines and Železničná spoločnosť Slovensko, a student card issued by selected Slovak schools and universities as well as Bratislavská mestská karta which is a Maestro PayPass card issued only to residents of Bratislava by participating banks. Customer can then load a travelcard at ticket offices of participating operators, some DPB ticket machines or via websites of IDS BK operators. Online purchase is only available at least one day before the first day of the travelcard validity – this is to ensure enough time for all operators' control devices (such as regional bus cash registers, or train conductor's control devices) to synchronize data about online tickets. Such synchronization is necessary since online tickets are not physically loaded into smartcard's chip when purchased. Instead, all control devices have database of tickets purchased online and compare loaded card's ID with this database. When purchasing travelcard on Bratislavská mestská karta, 10% discount from price of Bratislava zones is provided by City of Bratislava.

Tickets for animals, bigger baggage and bicycle transport must be purchased separately. A 15-minutes reduced travel ticket is used for this purpose and is valid for 180 minutes in this case. Transport of baggage not exceeding 60×45×25 cm, or of an animal transported in a container not exceeding these dimensions are free of charge. Bicycle transport is possible only on weekends and work holidays (whole day) or in intervals between 09:00–13:00 and 18:00–06:00 on workdays.

Some other special offers are also available, most notably discounted tickets available to customers of Železničná spoločnosť Slovensko together with train ticket to Bratislava, or free use of DPB services for customers arriving to Bratislava on selected EURegio tickets of Österreichische Bundesbahnen.

There is no ticket inspections when boarding DPB vehicles (except regional lines in some situations). Instead, random inspections by plain clothes ticket inspectors are conducted. It is mandatory for a ticket inspector to identify themselves by a company badge and an employee ID when asked to do so. The penalties for failing to comply with the transport rules are as follows: €50 when paid by card or cash at the time of the inspection or within 5 workdays, €70 when paid within 30 days from the time of the inspection, €5 in case of forgotten prepaid ticket or discount document, €5 in case of unpaid transport of animals, baggage or bicycles.

If the penalty is not paid at the time of the inspection, the inspectors have the right to ascertain the passenger's identity by means of inspecting their ID card, driver's license, passport or residence permit. If this is not possible, the inspector will cooperate with the City or National Police with the goal of discovering the passenger's identity.

=== International services ===
On international services operated by DPB (routes 801 to Rajka in Hungary and 901 to Hainburg an der Donau in Austria), special fares apply when crossing the border. Tickets cost €1.50 with a 50% discount available to some groups of customers (such as youth or seniors) and are valid for one journey without transfer, irrespective of the length of the journey. These tickets are purchased from driver. Minor discount is available when buying return ticket. When boarding in Hungary, fares can also be paid in Hungarian Forint.

For domestic journeys in Slovakia made on 801 services, standard domestic fares described above apply. All other kinds of domestic journeys (domestic journey in Hungary or any domestic journey on 901) are forbidden. Special offers are available on 901 services such as weekly tickets or discounted tickets, including use of the S7 route of the Vienna S-Bahn.

== Transport junctions ==
Transport junctions include Trnavské mýto, Račianske mýto, Patrónka, Bratislava main railway station, Zochova and Mlynské Nivy.

== Vehicles ==
Dopravný podnik Bratislava operates three types of vehicles. The current line-up comprises 481 buses, 168 trolleybuses (including 21 dual-mode buses) and 203 trams. The tables below list the individual models used today and in the past.

List of past and current models
Vehicle	In service	Ordered	Decommissioned	Introduced	Fleet Nos.	Notes
Buses
Otokar e-Kent C 12	3	—	—	2026	2611–2613	electrobus
SOR NS 18 Diesel	80	—	—	2026	3501–3580	
SOR NSG 18	43	—	—	2025–2026	3401–3443	Runs on CNG.
Solaris Urbino 12 Hydrogen	4	—	—	2023	2601–2604	Hydrogen buses.
SOR NS 12 Diesel	63	—	—	2022	2501–2563	
Otokar Kent C 18,75	71	—	—	2021–2022	3311–3381	
Rošero First FCLEI	4	—	—	2020	1231–1234	
Solaris New Urbino 18	12	—	—	2020	3221–3231	
Solaris New Urbino 18	12	—	—	2020	8012	#8012 used for driver training.
SOR NS 12 Electric	16	—	—	2018	3001–3016	electrobus
SOR EBN 8	2	—	—	2018	3901–3902	electrobus
Solaris Urbino 8.6	6	—	—	2018	1911–1916	
Iveco Urbanway 10.5M	24	—	—	2018	2401–2424	
SOR NB 12 City	28	—	—	2017	1021–1030	
SOR NB 12 City	28	—	—	2017	2031–2048	
SOR NBG 12 City	—	—	1	2017	2990	Runs on CNG.
Iveco Urbanway 12M	40	—	—	2014–2015	1041–1070	
Iveco Urbanway 12M	40	—	—	2014–2015	4041–4050	
Solaris Urbino 10	10	—	—	2014–2015	2001–2010	
Irisbus Crossway LE 12M	2	—	—	2010	3102	#8013 used for driver training.
Irisbus Crossway LE 12M	2	—	—	2010	8013	#8013 used for driver training.
SOR NB 18 City	178	—	5	2010–2017	1821–1868	#1838 decommissioned in 2016 after being heavily damaged in an accident.
SOR NB 18 City	178	—	5	2010–2017	2201–2251	#1838 decommissioned in 2016 after being heavily damaged in an accident.
SOR NB 18 City	178	—	5	2010–2017	2841–2870	#1838 decommissioned in 2016 after being heavily damaged in an accident.
SOR NB 18 City	178	—	5	2010–2017	4221–4274	#1838 decommissioned in 2016 after being heavily damaged in an accident.
SOR NB 18 City	178	—	5	2010–2017	8011	#8011 used for driver training.
Mercedes-Benz O405GN	—	—	11	2009–2014	1501–1511	Buses were rented to combat acute deficiency of high capacity vehicles.
Irisbus PS09D1 Citelis 12M TP	6	—	—	2010–2011	1031–1036	Variation adjusted for wheelchair users.
SOR BN 10.5	23	—	15	2009–2010	3401–3438	#3428, #3432, #3434 and #3437 rented to Prešov in 2018. All 4 buses were later sold to Prešov in summer 2020.
SOR BN 10.5	23	—	15	2009–2010	3401–3438	#3409, #3418 and #3436 rented to Prešov in 2019. All 3 buses were later sold to Prešov in summer 2020.
SOR BN 10.5	23	—	15	2009–2010	3401–3438	#3408 is used for winter maintenance of stops.
SOR BN 10.5	23	—	15	2009–2010	3401–3438	#3431 and #3433 rented to Prešov in 2020. Both buses were later sold to Prešov in February 2021.
Mercedes-Benz O530 GL CapaCity	39	—	2	2008–2013	4901–4941	#4909 and #4926 decommissioned, both due to fire.
SOR C 10.5	5	—	3	2008	3301–3305	3 vehicles (8006–8008) are being used for driver training.
SOR C 10.5	5	—	3	2008	8006–8008	3 vehicles (8006–8008) are being used for driver training.
Iveco Daily	4	—	4	2008–2010	1902–1909	#1904 and #1906 decommissioned in 2017 after independent accidents.
Karosa B 961	—	—	9	2008–2014	4385–4386	Rented in two phases (2008–2010 and 2014–2015).
Karosa B 961	—	—	9	2008–2014	4393–4399	Rented in two phases (2008–2010 and 2014–2015).
Karosa B 941	—	—	6	2008	1391–1394	Rented (2008–2010).
Karosa B 941	—	—	6	2008	4391–4392	Rented (2008–2010).
SOR BN 9.5	4	—	14	2007	3534–3551	#3535 decommissioned in 2019 after independent accident.
SOR BN 9.5	4	—	14	2007	3534–3551	9 vehicles (3534, 3538, 3540–3546) are used for winter maintenance of stops.
Trolleybuses
SOR TNS 12	11	—	—	2023–2024	6121–6131	Dual-mode bus, equipped with battery.
Škoda 27Tr Solaris	23	—	—	2023–2024	6711–6733	Dual-mode bus, equipped with battery.
Škoda-Solaris 24m	16	—	—	2023–2024	6901–6916	Dual-mode bus, equipped with battery.
Škoda 31Tr SOR	70	—	—	2014–2015	6801–6870	#8148 used for driver training.
Škoda 31Tr SOR	70	—	—	2014–2015	8148	#8148 used for driver training.
Škoda 30Tr SOR	35	—	—	2014–2015	6001–6035	#8147 used for driver training.
Škoda 30Tr SOR	35	—	—	2014–2015	8147	#8147 used for driver training.
Škoda 30TrDG SOR	15	—	—	2014–2015	6101–6115	Dual-mode bus, equipped with diesel APU.
Škoda 25Tr Irisbus	5	—	1	2006	6701–6706	Dual-mode bus, equipped with diesel APU.
Škoda 21Tr ACi	1	—	—	2004	6401	
Trams
Škoda 29T ForCity Plus	50	10	—	2015–2026	7401–7460	Delivery of 10 remaining units expected in 2026.
Škoda 30T ForCity Plus	40	—	—	2015–2024	7501–7540	Bi-directional.
ČKD Tatra T6A5	58	—	—	1991–2006	7901–7958	Usually used in couples.
ČKD Tatra K2	25	—	73	1969–2009	7085–7086	Most of the operational vehicles have been modernised.
ČKD Tatra K2	25	—	73	1969–2009	7103–7135	Several of the fleet numbers have been assigned to two different vehicles. Only active vehicles are listed here.
ČKD Tatra T3	48	—	146	1965–2007	7301–7304	Usually used in couples.
ČKD Tatra T3	48	—	146	1965–2007	7602–7704; 7706; 7610	Usually used in couples.
ČKD Tatra T3	48	—	146	1965–2007	7715; 7717–7718; 7733–7734	Most of the operational vehicles have been modernised.
ČKD Tatra T3	48	—	146	1965–2007	7781–7792; 7795–7796; 7799–7800	Most of the operational vehicles have been modernised.
ČKD Tatra T3	48	—	146	1965–2007	7835–7846	Several of the fleet numbers have been assigned to two different vehicles. Only active vehicles are listed here.
ČKD Tatra T3	48	—	146	1965–2007	8434,8437,8439	Several of the fleet numbers have been assigned to two different vehicles. Only active vehicles are listed here.

== Routes ==
Operating hours are from 4:00 am to 11:30 pm every day. Operating hours of night lines are 11:30 pm to 4:00 am every day.

City routes
Number	Route	Vehicle types
	Hlavná stanica (Main Station) - Nám Ľ. Štúra	Škoda 29T Forcity Plus ČKD Tatra K2S
	Rača - Petržalka	Škoda 30T Forcity Plus ČKD Tatra T6A5
	Zlaté Piesky, Stn. Nové Mesto - Dúbravka	Škoda 29T Forcity Plus ČKD Tatra T3
	Južné mesto - Ružinov	Škoda 29T Forcity Plus ČKD Tatra K2G
	Karlova Ves - Ružinov	Škoda 29T Forcity Plus ČKD Tatra T6A5 ČKD Tatra K2S
	Ružinov - Záhorská Bystrica	Škoda 30T Forcity Plus ČKD Tatra T3G
	Devínska Nová Ves, Opletalova, VW5 – Tesco Lamač	SOR NS 12 Diesel
	Devínska Nová Ves, Volkswagen, VW2 – Autobusová stanica (Bus Station)	SOR NB 18 City Otokar Kent C 18,75
	Devínska Nová Ves, Jána Jonáša, Volkswagen-1 (Volkswagen car factory) – Lamač	SOR NS 12 Diesel
	Devínska Nová Ves, Volkswagen, VW2 – Autobusová stanica (Bus Station)	
	Devínska Nová Ves, Jána Jonáša, VW1 (Volkswagen car factory) – Dúbravka, Homolova	
	Devinská Nová Ves, Opletalova, VW5 – Malá scéna (Blue church)	Otokar Kent C 18,75
	Patrónka – Dúbravka, Podvornice	SOR NS 12 Diesel
	Blumentál – Cintorín Slávičie	SOR NB 18 City Otokar Kent C 18,75
	Dlhé diely – Hlavná stanica (Main Railway Station)	Solaris New Urbino 18
	Dlhé diely – Riviéra	Škoda 30Tr SOR
	Dlhé diely – Dúbravská cesta	
	Strmé vŕšky – OC Bory	Iveco Urbanway 10,5M
	Most SNP – Záhorská Bystrica	SOR NB 18 City Otokar Kent C 18,75
	Ostredky, Súhvezdná – Cintorín Slávičie	SOR NB 18 City Otokar Kent C 18,75
	Hlavná stanica-Nové SND	Škoda 27Tr Solaris
	Cintorín Vrakuňa - Červený most	Škoda 31Tr SOR
	Hlavná stanica-Koliba	SOR TNS 12
	Kramáre NOÚ - Červený Most	Škoda 30Tr SOR
	TIPOS aréna - Červený Most	Škoda 30Tr SOR
	Ružová dolina, Mliekarenská - Kramáre NOÚ, Kramáre NÚSCCH	
	Petržalka, OC Einsteinova – Nové Mesto, Kukučínova	SOR NB 18 City Otokar Kent C 18,75
	MiÚ Nové Mesto – Depo Krasňany	SOR EBN 8
	Rača, Tbiliská – Stanica Vajnory (Vajnory Station)	Solaris Urbino 8,6
	Nové Mesto, Trnavské mýto – Vajnory	SOR NB 12 City SOR NS 12 Electric SOR NS 12 Diesel
	Rača, Tbiliská – Trnávka, Studená	Iveco Urbanway 10,5M SOR NS 12 Diesel
	Depo Jurajov dvor – Žabí majer	
	Rajská - Trnávka, Rádiová	Škoda 30Tr SOR
	Hlavná Stanica (Main Station) - Letisko (Airport)	Škoda 27Tr Solaris
	Trnávka, Avion Shopping Park – Lamač	Otokar Kent C 18,75
	Patrónka, Valašská - Ružinov, Jelačičova	Škoda 30Tr SOR
	Dolné hony, Čiližská – Rača, Tbiliská	SOR NB 12 City
	Prievoz, Domkárska – Grófska niva	Iveco Urbanway 10,5M Solaris Urbino 10 SOR NS 12 Diesel
	Podunajské Biskupice, Vinohradnícka – Ružinov, Astronomická	Iveco Urbanway 12M SOR NB 12 City SOR NS 12 Electric
	Nové Mesto, Trnavské mýto – Petržalka, Holíčska	Mercedes-Benz O530 GL CapaCity
	Trnávka, Avion Shopping Park – Pharos	Rošero First FCLEI
	Stanica Podunajské Biskupice (Podunajské Biskupice Station) – Most SNP	SOR NB 12 City; SOR NB 18 City Otokar Kent C 18,75
	Hlavná stanica (Main railway station) – Stn. Vrakuňa (Vrakuňa station)	Solaris Trollino 24
	Rajská – Stn. Vrakuňa (Vrakuňa station)	Škoda 31Tr SOR
	Krasňany, Kadnárova – Stn. Vrakuňa (Vrakuňa station)	SOR NS 12 Electric Solaris Urbino 12 Hydrogen
	Vlčie hrdlo – Spaľovňa	Rošero First FCLEI
	Staré Mesto, Nové SND (Slovak national theatre new building) – Stanica Podunajské Biskupice (Podunajské Biskupice Station)	SOR NB 12 City; SOR NB 18 City SOR NS 12 Electric Iveco Urbanway 12M Otokar Kent C 18,75 SOR NS 12 Diesel
	Stanica Podunajské Biskupice (Podunajské Biskupice Station) – Lieskovec	Rošero First FCLEI
	Staré mesto, Kollárovo nám. – Petržalka, Nesto	SOR NS 12 Diesel
	Dúbravka, Pri kríži – Petržalka, Kutlíkova	Mercedes-Benz O530 GL CapaCity
	Dúbravka, Pri kríži – Petržalka, Ovsište	Mercedes-Benz O530 GL CapaCity; Solaris New Urbino 18
	Petržalka, Ovsište – Vrakuňa, Bodvianska	Iveco Urbanway 12M SOR NB 12 City SOR NS 12 Diesel
	Autobusová stanica (Bus Station) – Most SNP	Iveco Urbanway 12M Otokar Kent C 18,75 SOR NB 18 City SOR NS 12 Electric SOR NS 12 Diesel
	Staré mesto, Nové SND – Danubiana	Irisbus Crossway LE 12M SOR NS 12 Diesel
	Most SNP – Čunovo	
	Depo Petržalka – Devinská Nová Ves, VW2	
	Hlavná stanica (Main Railway Station) – Petržalka, Vyšehradská	Solaris New Urbino 18
	Blumentál – Petržalka, Holíčska	SOR NS 12 Diesel
	Trnávka, Avion Shopping Park – Petržalka, Prokofievova	SOR NS 12 Diesel; SOR NB 18 City Otokar Kent C 18,75
	Nové Mesto, Kukučínova – Jasovská	Otokar Kent C 18,75
	Petržalka, Antolská – Petržalka, Ovsište	SOR NS 12 Diesel
	Hlavná stanica (Main Railway Station) – Cintorín Slávičie	
	Karlova Ves, Riviéra – Cintorín Slávičie	
	Koliba – Kamzík	SOR BN 10,5 SOR EBN 8 Solaris Urbino 8,6 Iveco Urbanway 10,5M
	Koliba – Jaskový rad	Rošero First FCLEI
	Staré Mesto, Hodžovo námestie (Presidential palace) – Búdková	Rošero First FCLEI
	Vinohrady, Lopenícka – Nové Mesto, Trnavské mýto	Solaris Urbino 8,6
	Horáreň Krasňany – Pekná cesta, Hubeného	SOR EBN 8
	Za Mokráňom – Račianske mýto	SOR NB 12 City
	Ekonomická univerzita (Economical university) – Staré Mesto, Prokopa Veľkého	
	Most SNP – Stanica Rusovce (Rusovce Station)	SOR NB 18 City
	Červený most – Petržalka, Jungmannova	SOR NS 12 Diesel

== See also ==
- Transport in Bratislava – for information about the transport in Bratislava in general
- Economy of Bratislava – for more information about the economic background of Bratislava
