= Dopravný podnik Bratislava =

- Type: City-owned company
- Industry: Services
- Genre: Transportation
- Founded: 1895 (then under the name "Bratislavská elektrická účastinná spoločnosť")
- Founder: Alexander Werner
- Headquarters: Bratislava, Slovakia
- Area served: Bratislava
- Key people: Martin Rybanský (CEO)
- Services: Public transportation, Driving lessons, Bus maintenance
- Owner: city Bratislava
- Divisions: Elektrické dráhy (Electric Tracks) – trams and trolleybuses, Autobusy (Buses)
- Website: dpb.sk

Dopravný podnik Bratislava, a.s. (literally Public Transport Company Bratislava, inc., abbr. DPB a.s.) is the only provider of city public transport in Bratislava. It provides 3 types of transportation:

- trams (streetcars) 230 vehicles
- buses 464 vehicles
- trolleybuses 174 vehicles

The 100% owner of the company is the city of Bratislava.

== Vehicles ==
DPB provides public transport using these vehicles:

Trams:

- Tatra-ČKD T3 113 vehicles (110 vehicles have digital/electronic destination sign installation and acoustic information system)
- Tatra-ČKD T3 4 vehicles are reconstructed to T3MOD (1 vehicle), T3AS (1 vehicle), T3S (2 vehicles)
- Tatra-ČKD T3P 20 vehicles
- Tatra-ČKD K2 3 historic vehicles
- Tatra-ČKD K2S 22 vehicles
- Tatra-ČKD K2G 1 vehicle (reconstructed in 1998–2005)
- Tatra-ČKD T6A5 58 vehicles (2 prototype trams delivered in 2006)
- Škoda 29 T 50 vehicles
- Škoda 30 T 40 vehicles

Buses:

- Ikarus 280 1 historic vehicle (all vehicles are reject)
- Karosa B 732 30 vehicles and 2 historic vehicles (48 vehicles are reconstructed to Karosa B732 NSTG)
- Ikarus 283 1 vehicle and 2 historic vehicles (the others vehicles are reject)
- Karosa B 741 91 vehicles (86 vehicles are reconstructed to Karosa B741 NSTG)
- TAM 260 A 180 M 1 historic vehicle
- TAM 272 A 180 M 6 vehicles and 1 historic vehicle (all vehicles are reconstructed)
- TAM 232 A 116 M 4 vehicles (all vehicles are reconstructed, one vehicle is reject)
- Ikarus 435 85 vehicles (3 vehicles are reconstructed)
- Ikarus 415 35 vehicles (1 vehicle was reconstructed abortion in years 2004–2005 to Ikarus 415 CNG)
- Ikarus 412 3 vehicles with low-floor (1 vehicle is specially using for handicapped children)
- SOR B 9.5 32 vehicles
- SOR BN 9.5 18 vehicles with low-floor
- Mercedes-Benz Sprinter 416 CDI 2 minibuses with low-floor
- Solaris Urbino 15 CNG 22 vehicles with low-floor
- Iveco Daily Way 8 minibuses with low-floor
- SOR C 10.5 8 vehicles
- Tedom C12 G 30 vehicles (lease by Tedom from January 2009 to January 2017)
- SOR BN 10.5 38 vehicles with low-floor
- Mercedes-Benz O 530 Citaro CNG 1 vehicle
- Mercedes-Benz O 530 GL CapaCity 41 vehicles
- Mercedes-Benz O 405 GN2 11 vehicles with low-floor (lease by Abuss s.r.o. Nitra from November 2009)
- SOR NB 18 City 182 vehicles
- Irisbus Citelis 12M 35 vehicles
- Iveco Urbanway 12M 40 vehicles
- Solaris Urbino 10 10 vehicles
- SOR NB 12 City 28 vehicles
- Solaris Urbino 8,6 6 vehicles
- SOR EBN 8 2 vehicles
- SOR NS 12 Electric 16 vehicles
- MAN NG 313 5 vehicles (all vehicles are from Klagenfurt)
- Solaris Urbino 18 6 vehicles (all vehicles are from Berlin BVG)
- Solaris New Urbino 18 12 vehicles
- Rošero First FCLEI 4 vehicles
- Otokar Kent C 18,75 71 vehicles
- SOR NS 12 Diesel 80 vehicles
- Solaris Urbino 12 Hydrogen 4 vehicles

Trolleybuses:

- Škoda 14Tr 65 vehicles (21 vehicles are reconstructed)
- Škoda 14TrM 12 vehicles
- Škoda 15Tr 16 vehicles (all vehicles are reconstructed)
- Škoda 15TrM 23 vehicles
- Škoda 21Tr 1 vehicle with low-floor
- Škoda 25Tr 6 vehicles with diesel-electric agregat with low-floor
- Škoda 30Tr 35 vehicles with low-floor and 15 vehicles with diesel-electric agregat with low-floor
- Škoda 31Tr 70 vehicles with low-floor
- Škoda-Solaris 24m 16 vehicles with battery with low-floor
- Škoda 27Tr 23 vehicles with battery with low-floor
- SOR TNS 12 11 vehicles with battery with low-floor

== Aggregate ==
1 January 2009 Public Transport Company Bratislava have 880 carry on vehicles.

== Directors ==
- 1895–1907 – Karol Kakulay
- 1907–1920 – Rudolf Pleskott
- 1920–1939 – Ing. Jaroslav Bartošek
- 1939–1943 – Ing. Štefan Januš
- 1943–1949 – Dr. Vladimír Brežný
- 1949–1950 – Ján Bauman
- 1950–1951 – Ján Mazáček
- 1951–1954 – Martin Hanzlík
- 1954–1960 – Jozef Zatlkaj
- 1960–1970 – Ladislav Studenič
- 1970–1972 – František Mariš
- 1972–1987 – Ing. Ladislav Moštenan
- 1986–1990 – Ing. Ján Novotný
- 1990–1992 – dpt. Jozef Hlavina
- 1992–1994 – JUDr. Ivan Letaši
- 1994–1995 – Ing. Peter Forgáč
- 1995–1997 – Ing. Peter Klučka
- 1997–2007 – Ing. Ján Zachar
- 2007–2009 – Róbert Kadnár
- 2009–2011 – Ing. Pavel Derkay
- 2011–2015 – Ing. Ľubomír Belfi
- 2015–2019 – Ing. Milan Urban
- 2019–present – Ing. Martin Rybanský

== Former names of DPB ==
Over the course of the past century Public Transport Company Bratislava has had about 14 names.

- BEÚS – Bratislavská elektrická účastinná spoločnosť
- BKH – Elektrická lokálna železnica Bratislava- krajinská hranica
- BMEŽ – Bratislavská mestská elektrická železnica
- DOZAB – Dopravné závody hl. m. Bratislavy, komunálny podnik
- DPMB – Dopravný podnik mesta Bratislava
- DPHMB koncern – Dopravné podniky hl. m. SSR Bratislavy – koncern
- DZHMB – Dopravné závody hl. m. SSR Bratislavy, koncernový podnik
- DPB, š.p. – Dopravný podnik Bratislava, štátny podnik
- POHéV – Pozsony Országhatárszeli Helyiérdekú Villamos Vasút
- PVVV – Pozsonyi Város Villamos Vasút
- LWP – Lokalbahn Wien – (Pozsony) Pressburg (Pressburgerbahn)
- NOLB – Niederosterreichische Landdesbahnen – Dolnorakúske krajinské železnice
- DPB – Dopravný podnik Bratislava, štátny podnik
- DPB – Dopravný podnik Bratislava, akciová spoločnosť (today)

== Gallery ==
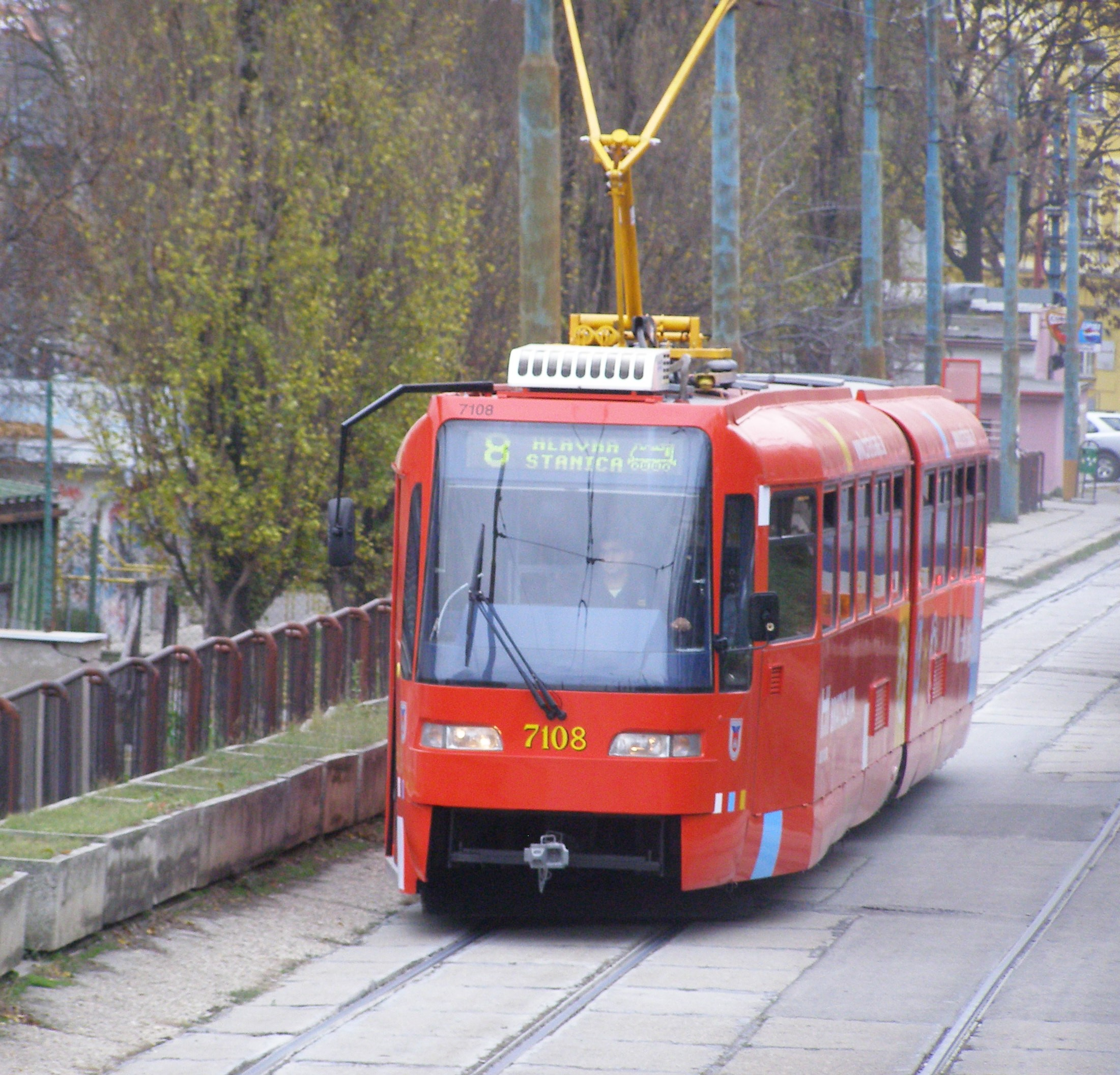
TATRA ČKD K2S (Little Big City promotion) #7108, Hlavná stanica (main railway station)

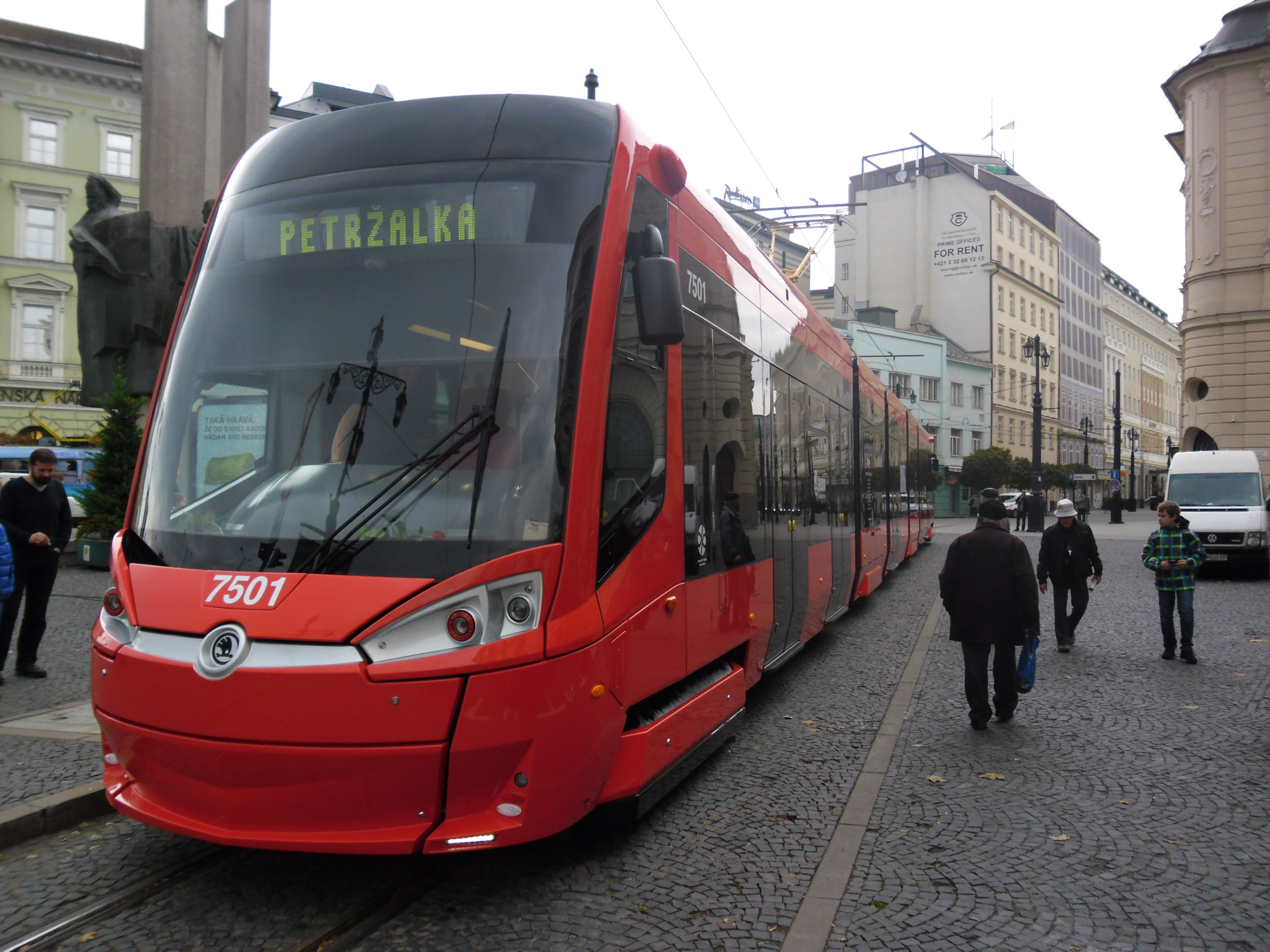
Škoda 30 T, one of the vehicles to be used on a fast tram track to Petržalka

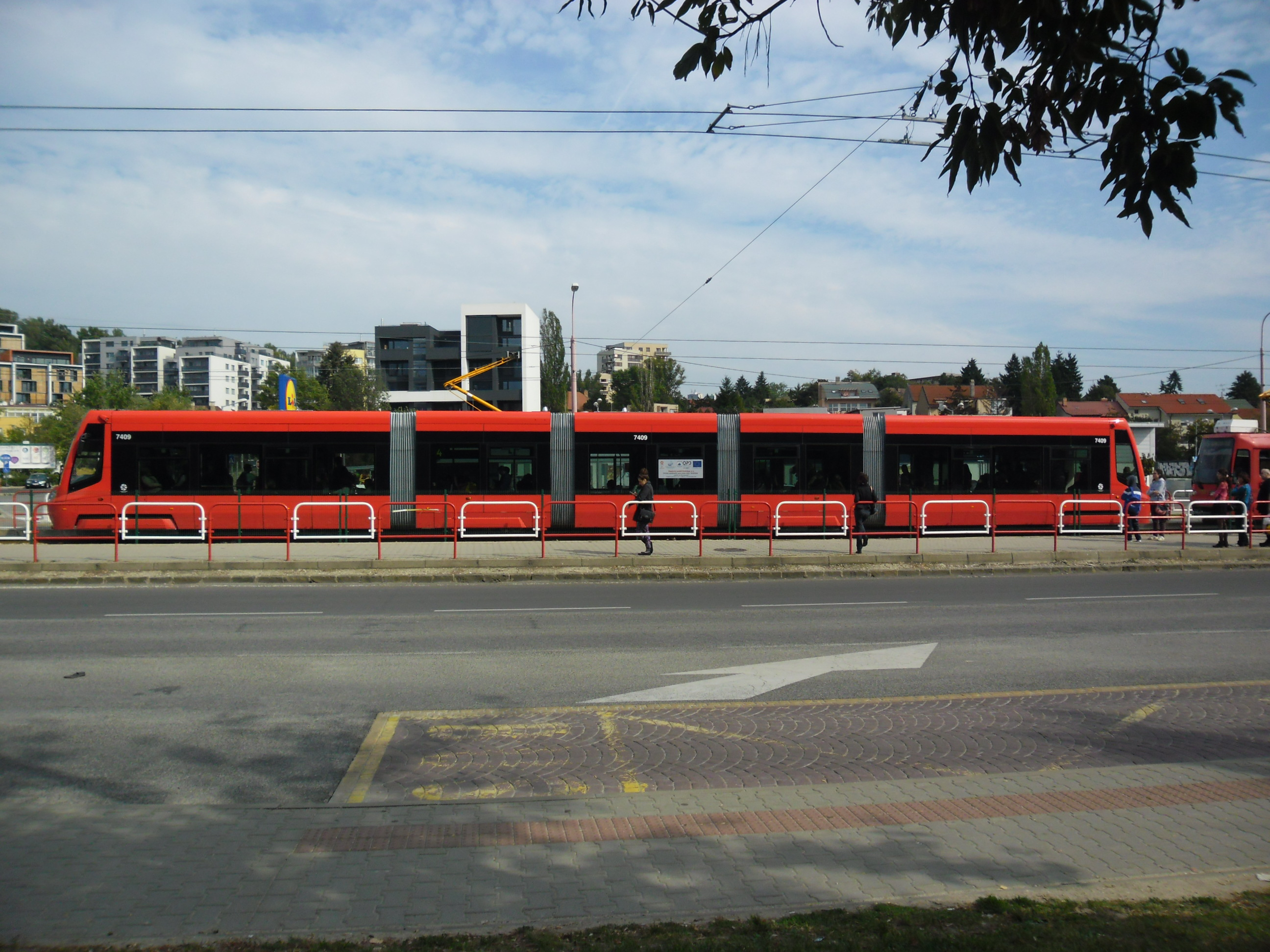
Škoda 29 T in Bratislava

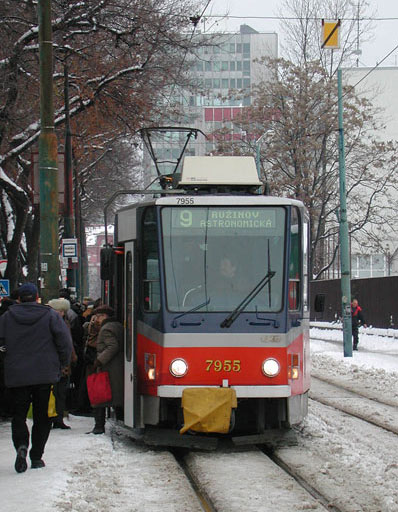
TATRA ČKD T6A5 from third #7955–7956 series, Miletičova ulica (Miletič street) on bus stop Záhradnícka.

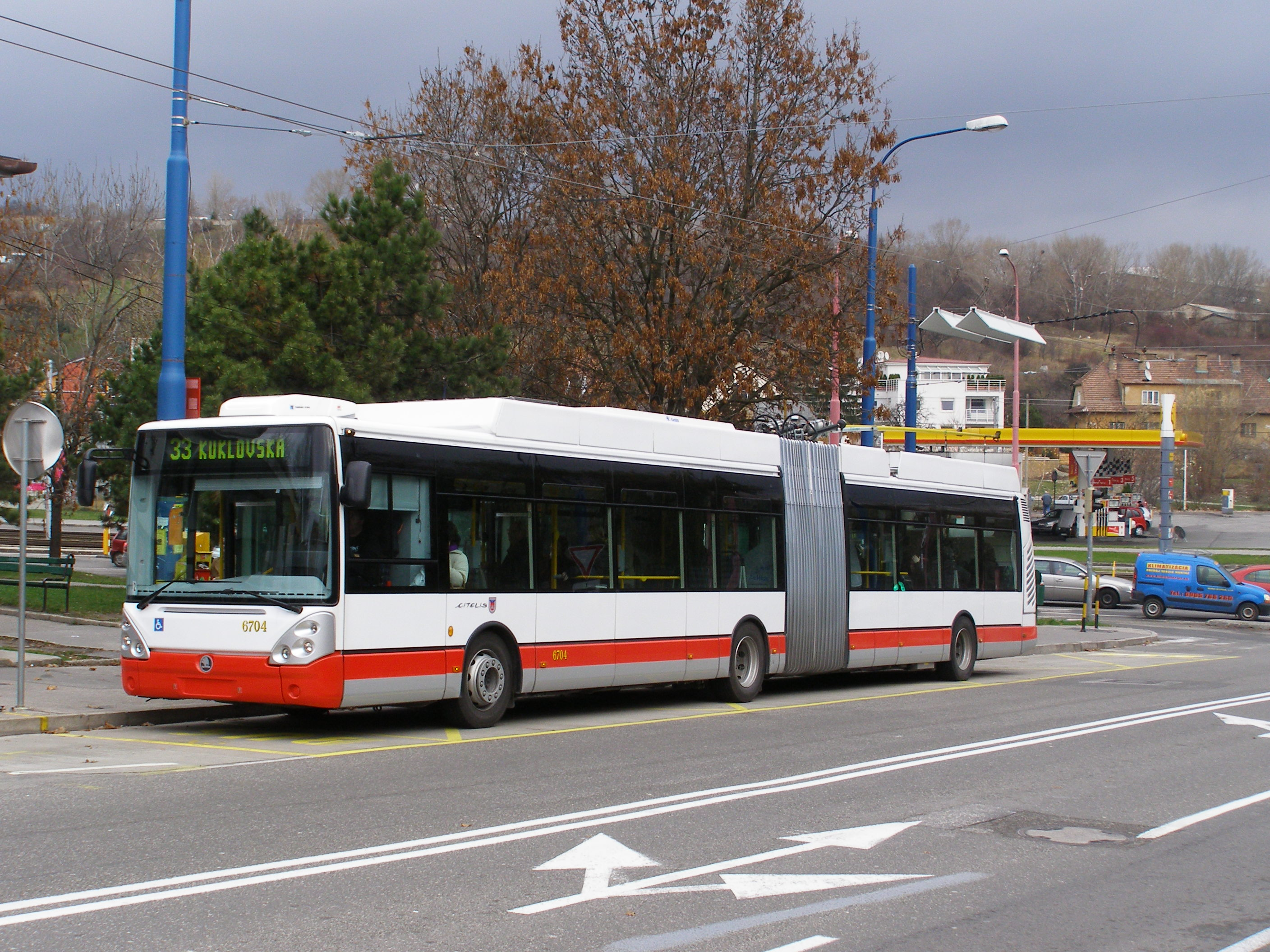
ŠKODA 25Tr with diesel-electric aggregate #6704, Molecova ulica (Molecova street) on Molecova stop.

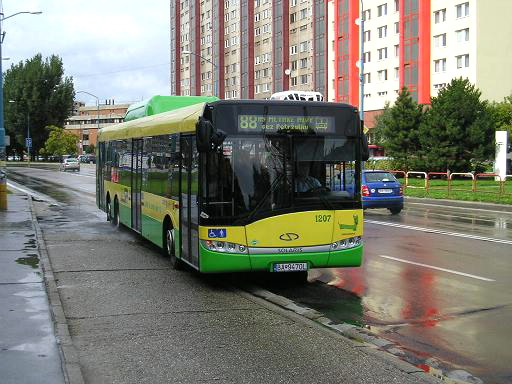
SOLARIS URBINO 15CNG III #1207, Námestie hraničiarov in Petržalka
