= SOR LH 12 =

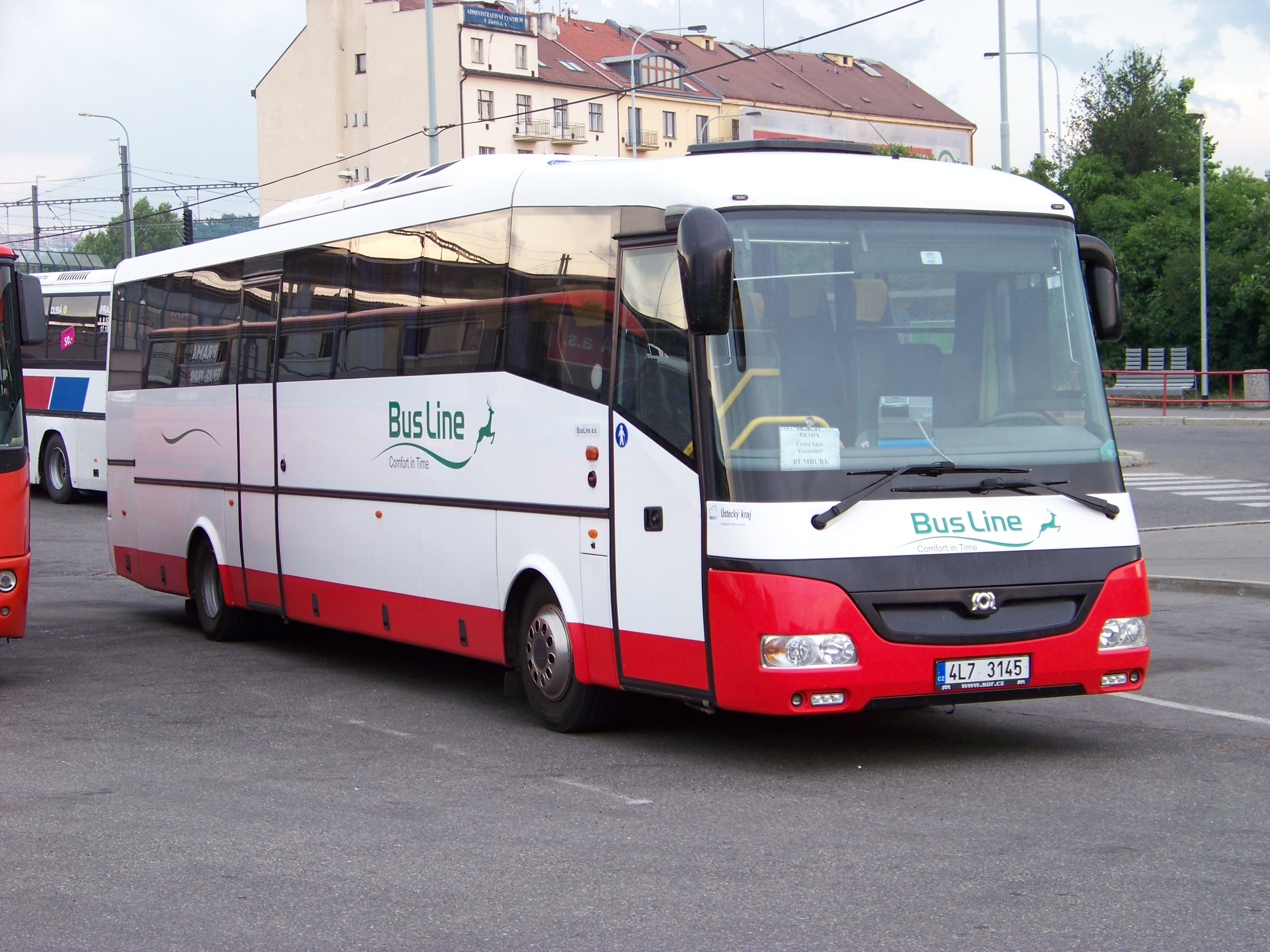
- SOR LH 12 in Prague, Czech Republic

Overview
- Manufacturer: SOR

Body and chassis
- Doors: 2
- Floor type: High-floor

Powertrain
- Engine: IVECO Tector NEF V6 Diesel engine
- Capacity: 51 sitting
- Power output: 220 kW (295 hp)
- Transmission: ZF 6-speed manual

Dimensions
- Length: 11,820 mm (465.4 in)
- Width: 2,525 mm (99.4 in)
- Height: 3,265 mm (128.5 in)
- Curb weight: 10,400 kg (22,900 lb)

SOR LH 12 is a touristic bus and long-distance coach produced by Czech bus manufacturer SOR since 2005.

== Construction features ==
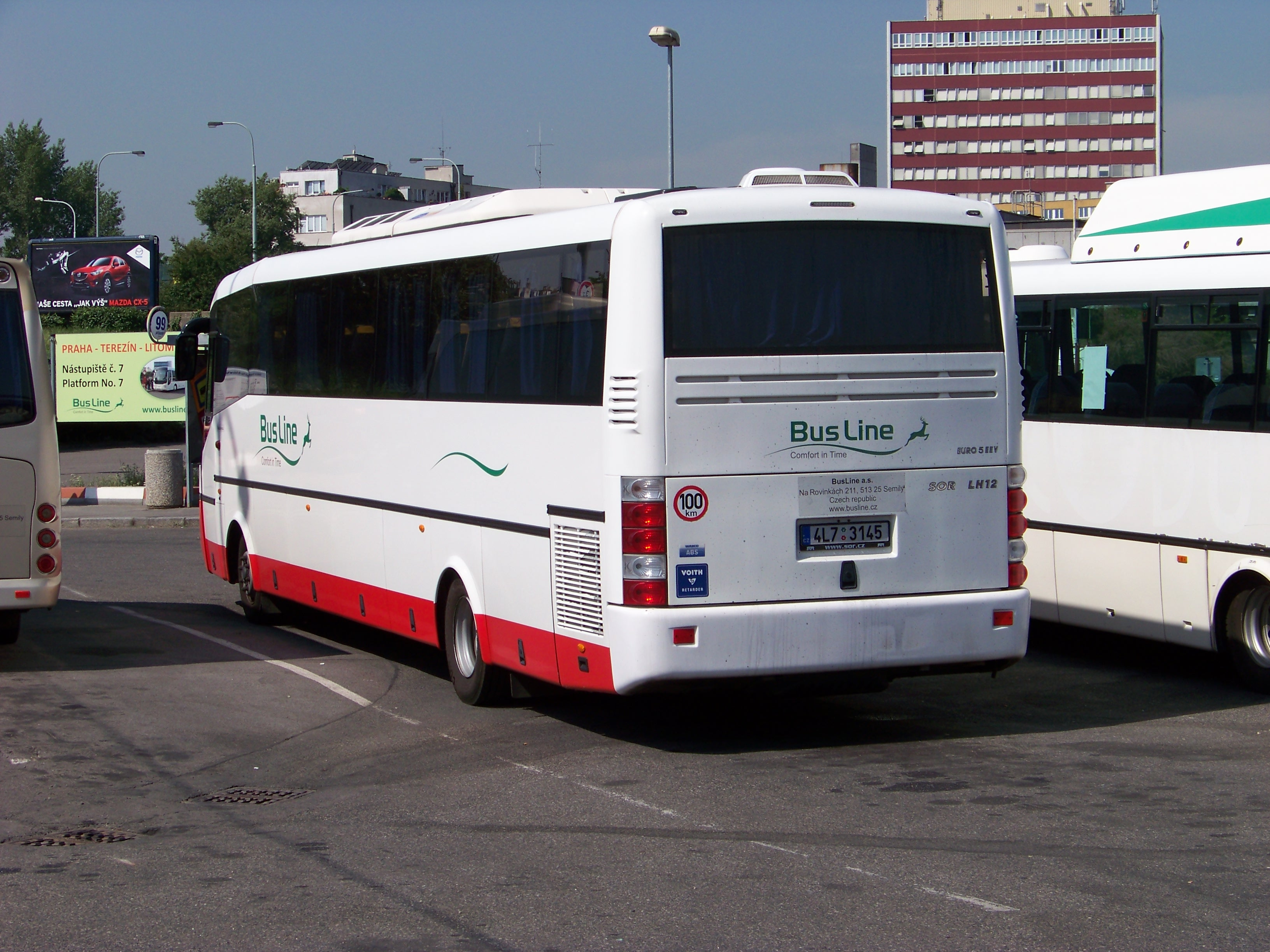
SOR LH 12 rear

LH 12 is a two-axle bus with a semi-self supporting bodywork which is welded from closed steel profiles. The outer part of the body is lined with flashing, the interior is lined with plastic sheeting. Some of the lower parts of the skeleton are made of stainless steel. The engine and manual gearbox are located at the rear of the vehicle under the floor. Rear-driven axle is the Spanish brand DANA, front axle of custom design is trapezoidal with independent wheel suspension. Seats for passengers are disposed on the raised pedestals are spaced 2 + 2 central aisle. The luggage compartment under the floor of the car has a volume of 8 m³. The bus has two doors. The first is located in front of the front axle, the latter can be customized to be placed in front of or behind the rear axle.

== Production and operation ==
LH 12 is the flagship bus of company SOR, which was introduced at Autosalon Nitra in 2005. The manufacturer has responded to the wishes of customers who wanted a classic twelve-meter length Coach, which were in the Czech Republic until then domain competing Karosa. Production of vehicle LH 12 was launched shortly thereafter. LH 12 buses are designed for long-distance lines or for chartered transport. Between transport companies which run this model, includes Veolia Transport ČSAD Vsetín or in Slovakia SAD Humenné.
