= SOR NS 18 =

Czech electric articulated bus

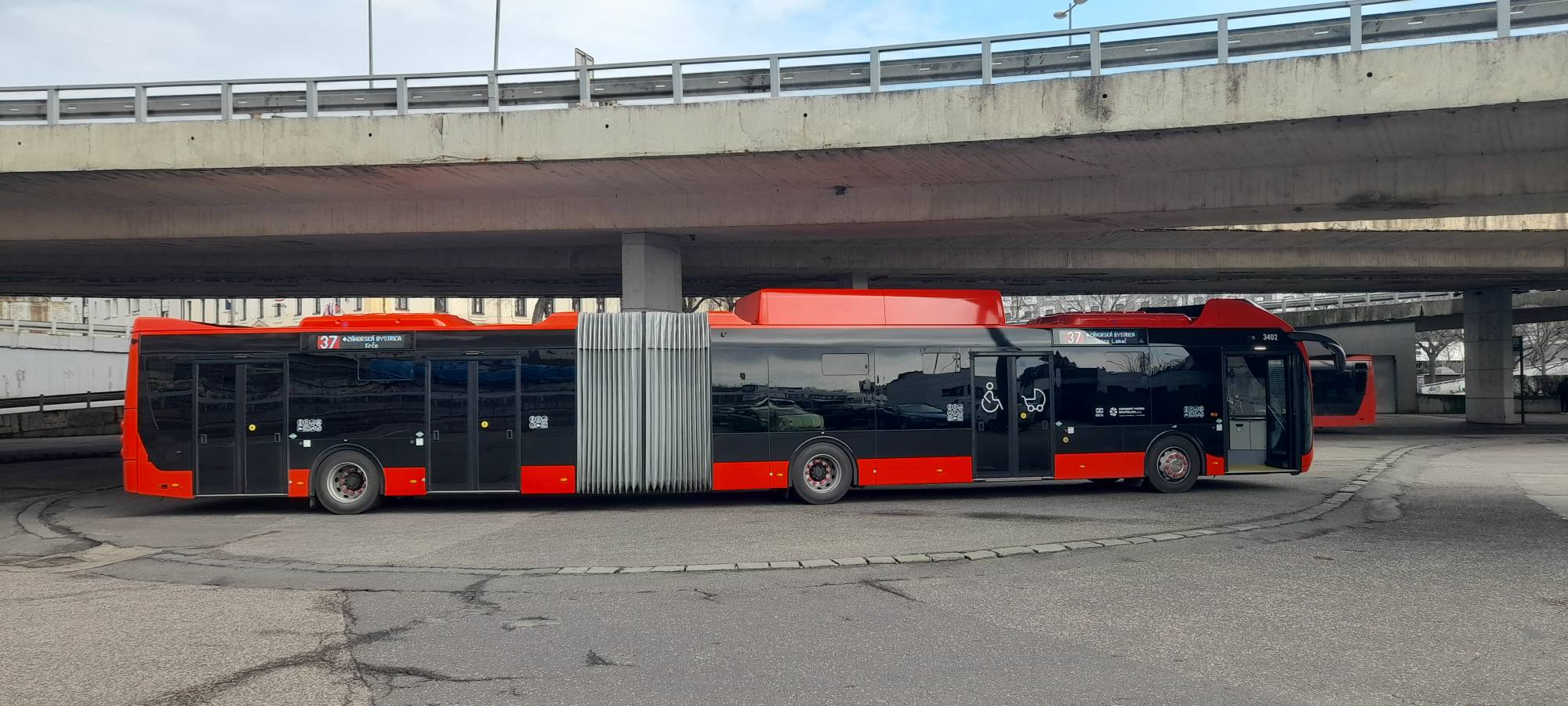
- SOR NSG 18 in Bratislava

Overview
- Manufacturer: SOR

Body and chassis
- Doors: 4 or 3 doors
- Floor type: low-floor

Powertrain
- Engine: Iveco Cursor 9 Euro VI
- Capacity: 64 to 80 seated
- Power output: 243 kW (326 hp)
- Transmission: ZF 6-speed automatic

Dimensions
- Length: 18,750 mm (738.2 in)
- Width: 2,550 mm (100.4 in)
- Height: 2,995 mm (117.9 in)
- Curb weight: 14,500 kg (32,000 lb)

Chronology
- Predecessor: SOR NB 18

SOR NS 18 is a low-floor articulated single-decker bus produced by Czech bus manufacturer SOR since 2018. In many towns they will replace Karosa B 741 and Karosa B 941.

== Construction features ==
SOR NS 18 is derived from the SOR NS 12 rigid single-decker bus. It is made of two rigid sections linked by a pivoting joint. Engine and automatic transmission are located in the left rear corner of the bus. Inside are used plastic Ster seats. Rear axle is VOITH brand, as well as medium axle, the front axle is of its own production with independent wheel suspension. Only third C axle is propulsed, meaning that this articulated bus has pusher configuration. Body of the vehicle is welded from steel-voltage profiles, flashings from the outside and interior are lined with plastic sheeting. The floor of the bus is at a height of 340 mm above the ground. On the right side of the bus are four doors.

In Czechia are also produced trolleybus Škoda 33Tr SOR in Škoda Transportation, which are based on SOR NS 18 bodies.

== Production and operation ==
In 2018 SOR introduced in Prague on Czechbus. Articulated single-decker bus NS 18 was presented with their prototype after the prototype has done both test drive through cities in Czechia and Slovakia. From May 15 to June 3, 2019, Bratislava became the first to test this bus. From December 6, 2019 to January 31, 2020, Hradec Králové leased this bus for tests.
