= Škoda 30Tr SOR =

Full-sized low-entry trolleybus produced by Škoda

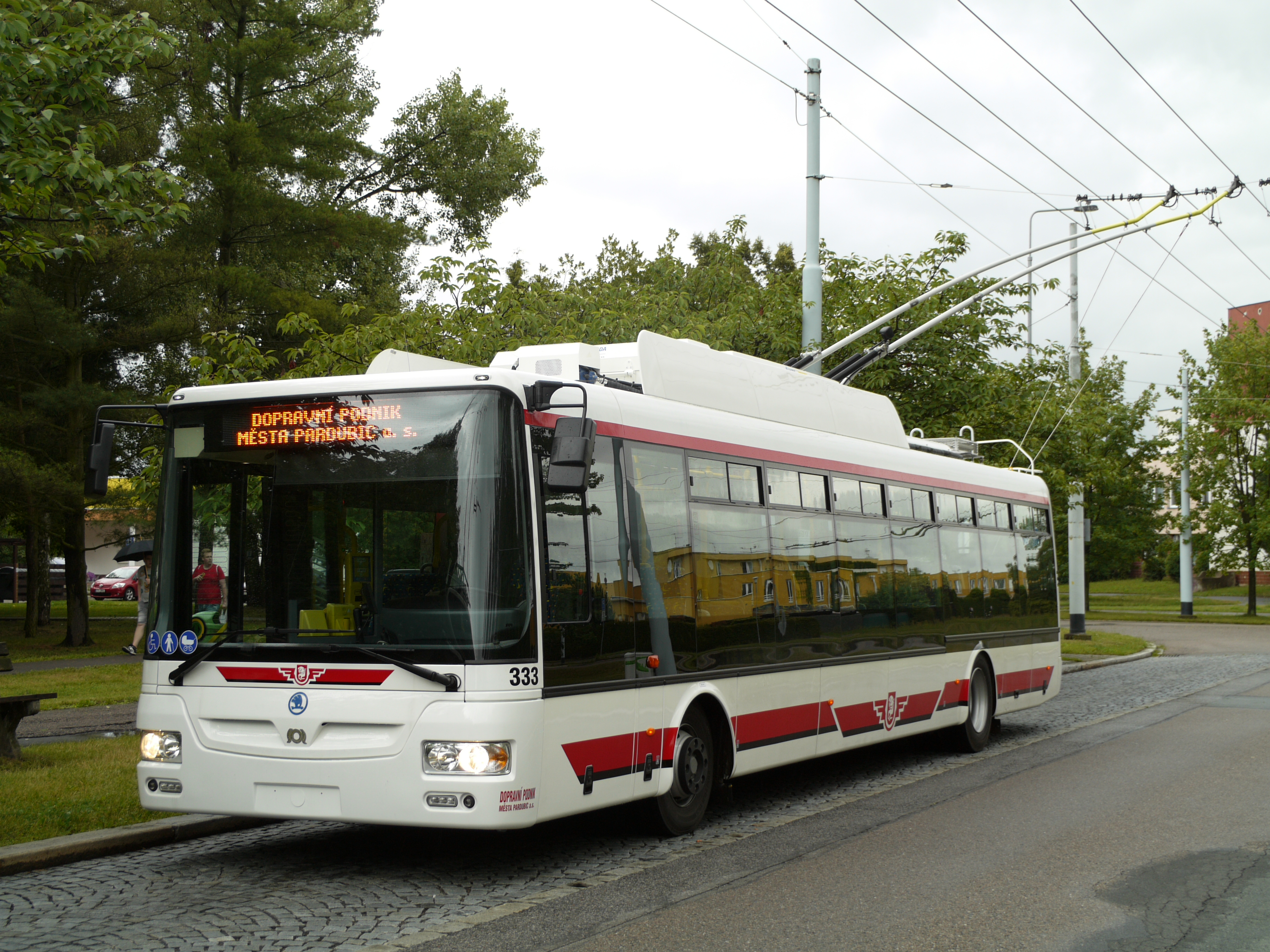
- Škoda 30Tr SOR in Pardubice

Overview
- Manufacturer: SOR, Škoda Transportation

Body and chassis
- Doors: 4 or 3
- Floor type: Low-floor; Low-entry

Powertrain
- Engine: Škoda 4ML 3444 K/4
- Capacity: 32 sitting 68 standing
- Power output: 1 × 160 kW (210 hp)

Dimensions
- Length: 12,180 mm (39 ft 11 1/2 in)
- Width: 2,550 mm (8 ft 4 3/8 in)
- Height: 2,900 mm (9 ft 6 1/8 in)
- Curb weight: 10,180 kg (22,440 lb)

The Škoda 30Tr SOR is a full-sized low-entry trolleybus produced in cooperation of Škoda Electric (subsidiary of Škoda Transportation) (electrical equipment and assembly) and SOR, which supplies the body based on the bus SOR NB 12.

== Construction features ==
The Škoda 30Tr is derived from the SOR NB 12 rigid bus. Electric motor is located in the rear of the bus. Plastic Ster seats are used inside. Rear axle is VOITH brand, the front axle is its own production with independent wheel suspension. Only rear axle is driven. Body of the vehicle is welded from steel-voltage profiles, flashings from the outside and interior are lined with plastic sheeting. The floor of the bus is at a height of 360 mm (14 in) above the ground. On the right side of the bus, there are four passenger doors (first is narrower than the other doors).

== Production and operation ==
Production started in 2011. In Czech and Slovak cities they replaced old high-floor trolleybuses Škoda 14Tr

Country	City	Year	Amount	Reference
Czech Republic	Hradec Králové	2011–2020	28	
Czech Republic	Pardubice	2016–2018	22	
Czech Republic	Prague	2018	1	
Czech Republic	Teplice	2013–2018	8	
Czech Republic	Zlín – Otrokovice	2019	7	
Slovakia	Banská Bytrica	2011–2015	20	
Slovakia	Bratislava	2014–2015	50	
Slovakia	Prešov	2017–2020	9	
Slovakia	Žilina	2012–2013	7	
