= Prievoz viaduct =

Coordinates: 48°9′21″N 17°10′53″E

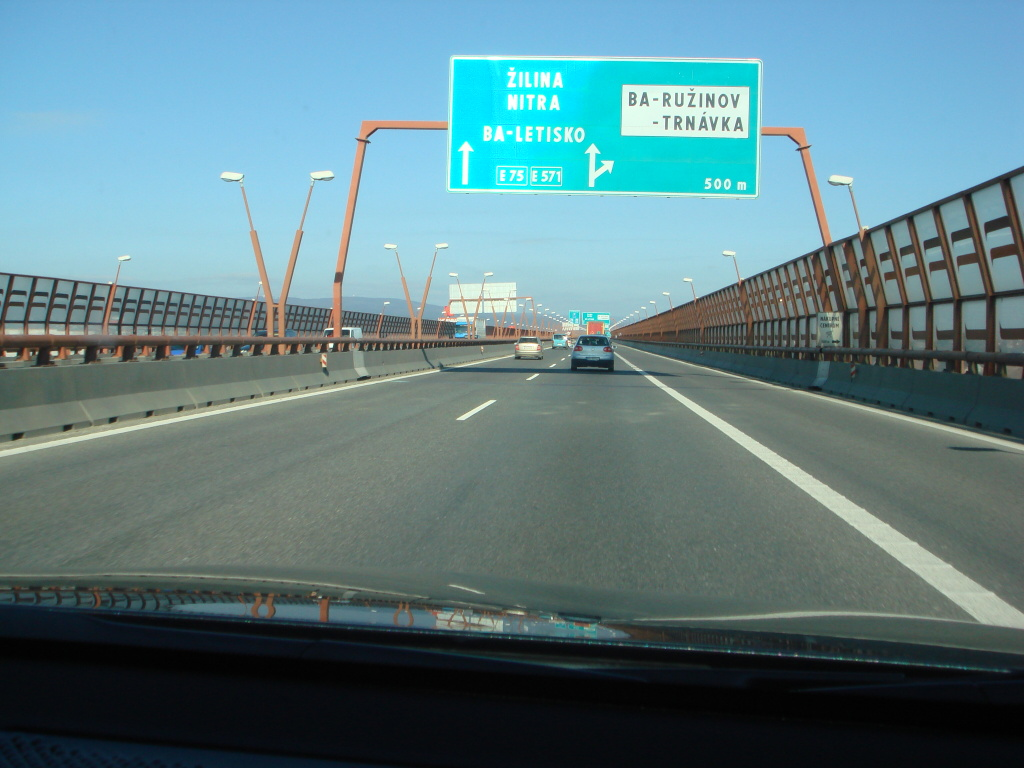
Prievoz viaduct, Žilina and Nitra direction

Prievoz viaduct is a 1,756-metre-long (5,761 ft) viaduct in Bratislava, Slovakia. It is located on the D1 highway and spans several streets and the main railroad near the borough of Ružinov. On the viaduct there are 2 interchanges: one full (Gagarinova street) and one partial (Galvaniho street, close to the airport). The viaduct was built from 1999 to 2002 and opened on August 30, 2002.
