= SOR NB 12 =

Czech single-decker city bus

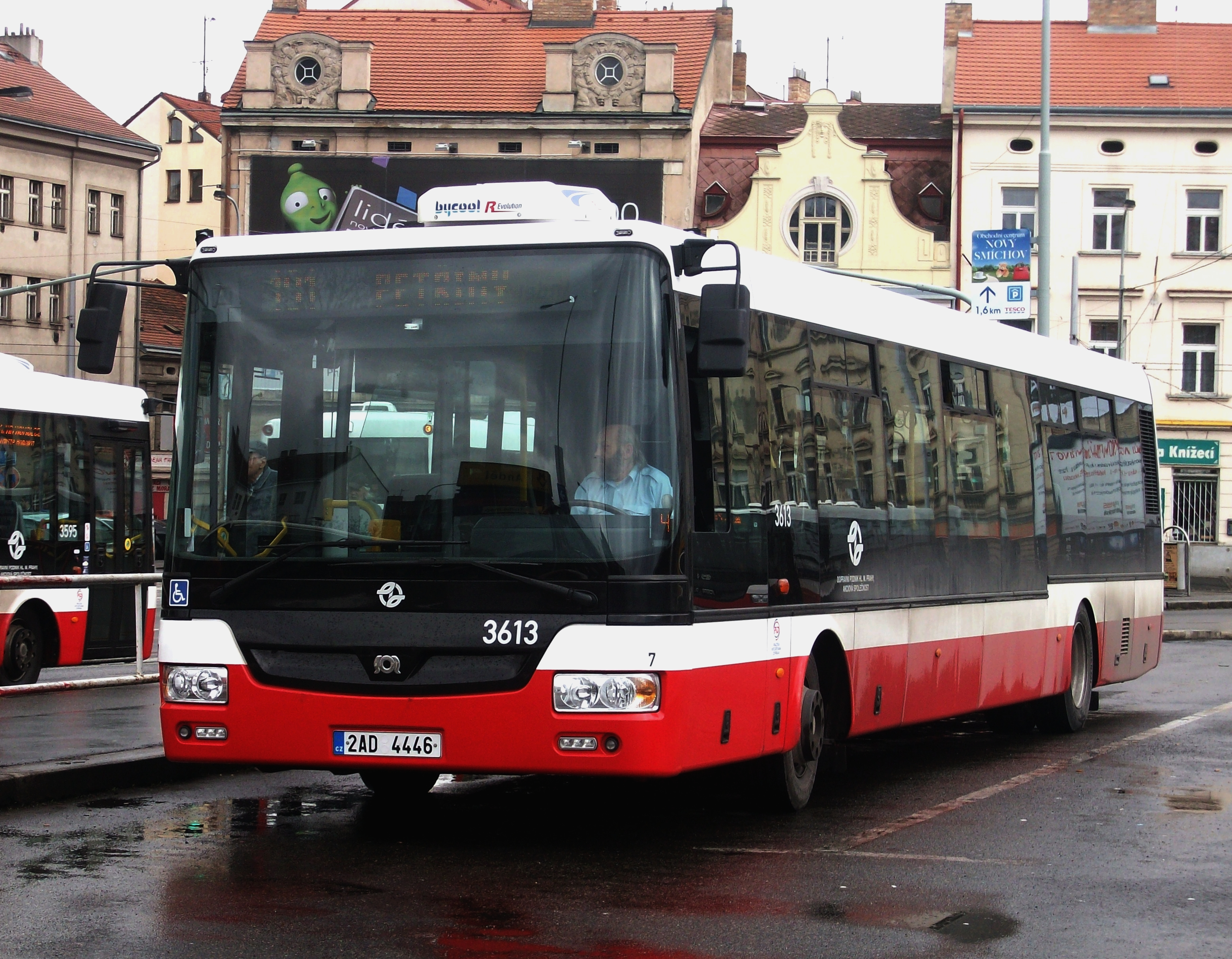
- A SOR NB12 made in the year 2011, operated by Prague transport company (DPP)

Overview
- Type: Standard City Bus
- Manufacturer: SOR
- Production: 2008-2022

Body and chassis
- Doors: 4, 3 or 2
- Floor type: Fully low-floor

Powertrain
- Engine: Iveco Tector F4AE3682E Euro V
- Capacity: 36 seated, 80 standing 116 passengers
- Power output: 194 kW (260 hp)
- Transmission: ZF 6-speed automatic Allison 6-speed automatic

Dimensions
- Length: 12,180 mm (479.5 in)
- Width: 2,550 mm (100.4 in)
- Height: 2,900 mm (114.2 in)
- Curb weight: 9,700 kg (21,400 lb)

Chronology
- Successor: SOR NS 12

The SOR NB 12 is low-floor single-decker bus produced by the Czech bus manufacturer SOR since the year 2008. As of July 2026 they are still the most common bus to find in the streets of Prague but they are slowly getting replaced by more modern buses such as the Iveco Streetway 12M and the Iveco Urbanway 12M Hybrid.

== Construction features ==
The SOR NB 12 is a bus model derived from the SOR NB 18, an articulated single-decker bus. The engine and the automatic transmission are located in the left rear corner of the bus. The bus uses plastic Ster seats. The rear axle is manufactured by Voith and the front axle is own production with independent wheel suspension. Only the rear axle is propulsed. The body of the vehicle is welded from steel-voltage profiles, the flashings from the outside and the interior are lined with plastic sheeting. The floor of the bus is 360mm above the ground. The bus has 4 doors on the right side, with the first door being smaller than the other 3 doors

They also produced the trolleybuses SOR TNB 12 and the Škoda 30Tr SOR in Škoda Transportation, which are both based on the body of the SOR NB 12.

== Production and operation ==
In 2006 the bus company SOR introduced a completely new range of low-floor buses at the Autotec exhibition in Brno. Their standard bus (SOR NB 12) and their articulated bus (SOR NB 18) were presented with their prototypes after they had done test drives in cities in the Czech Republic and Slovakia. The SOR NB 18 was introduced at the Autotec exhibition in 2008 with its differences mostly consisting of a modified design. Serial production began in the fall of 2008.

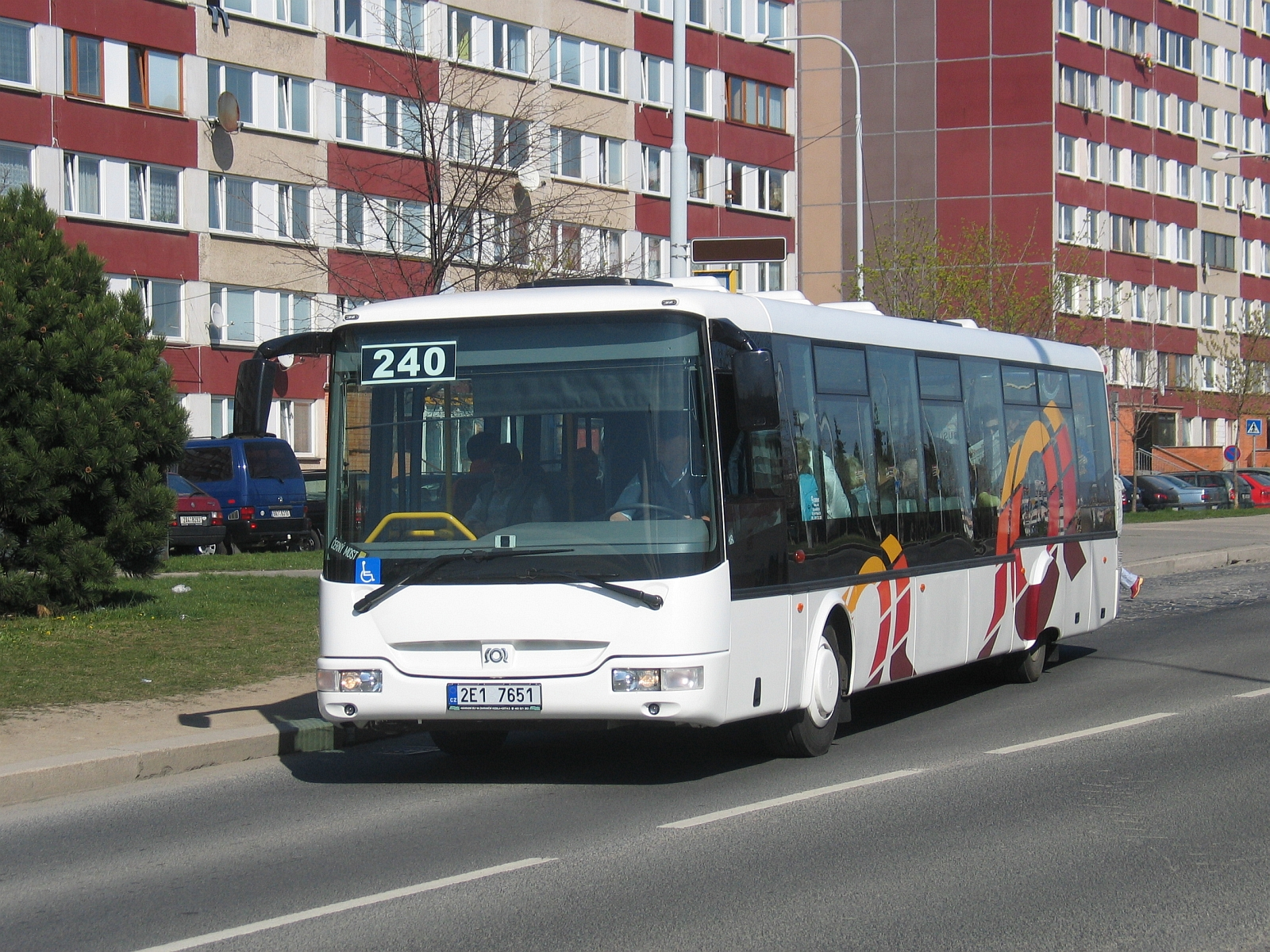
First prototype

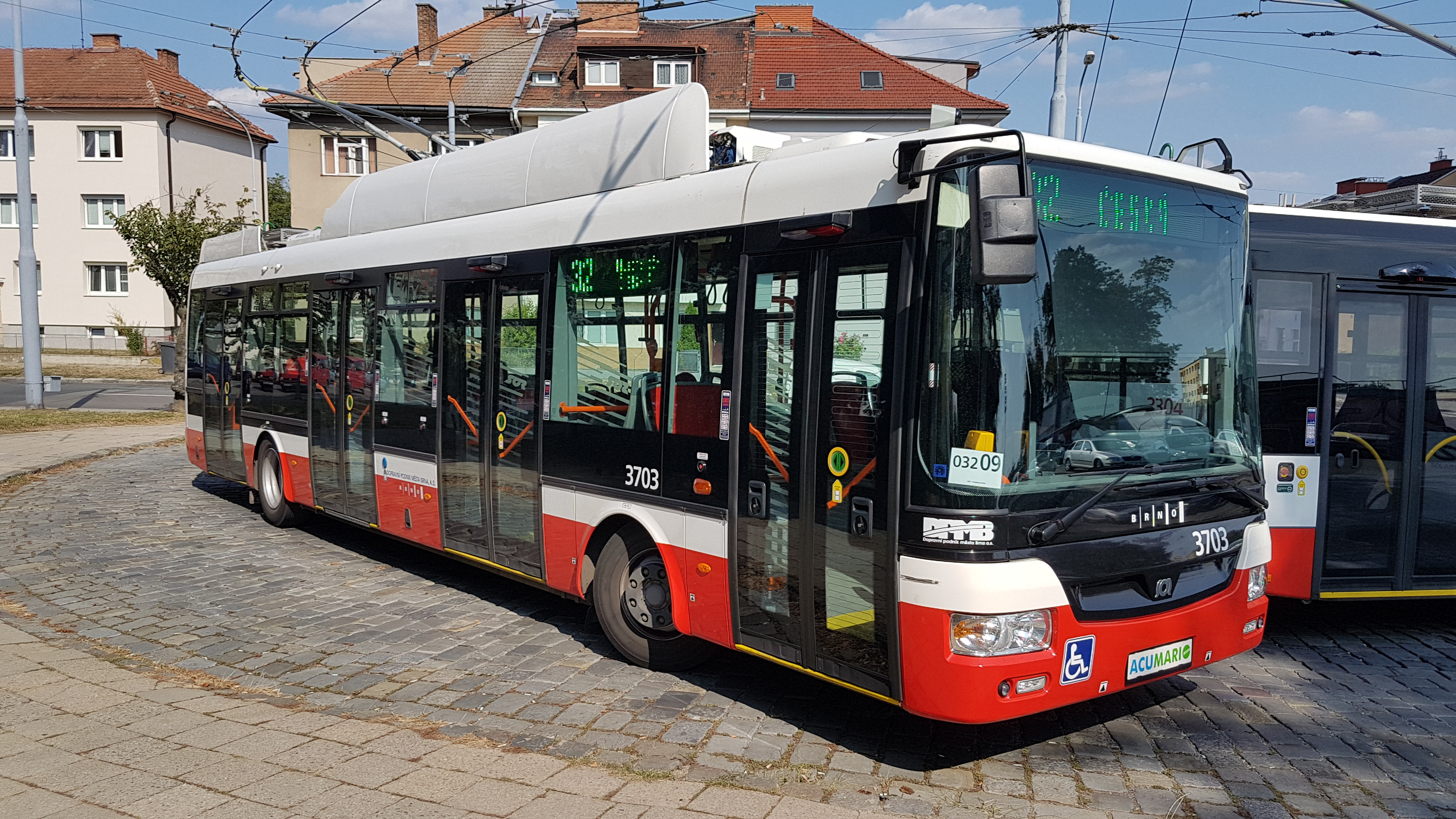
Trolleybus SOR TNB 12 in Brno, Czech Republic

== See also ==
- (in Czech)Photos of second prototype
