= SOR NB 18 =

Czech articulated bus

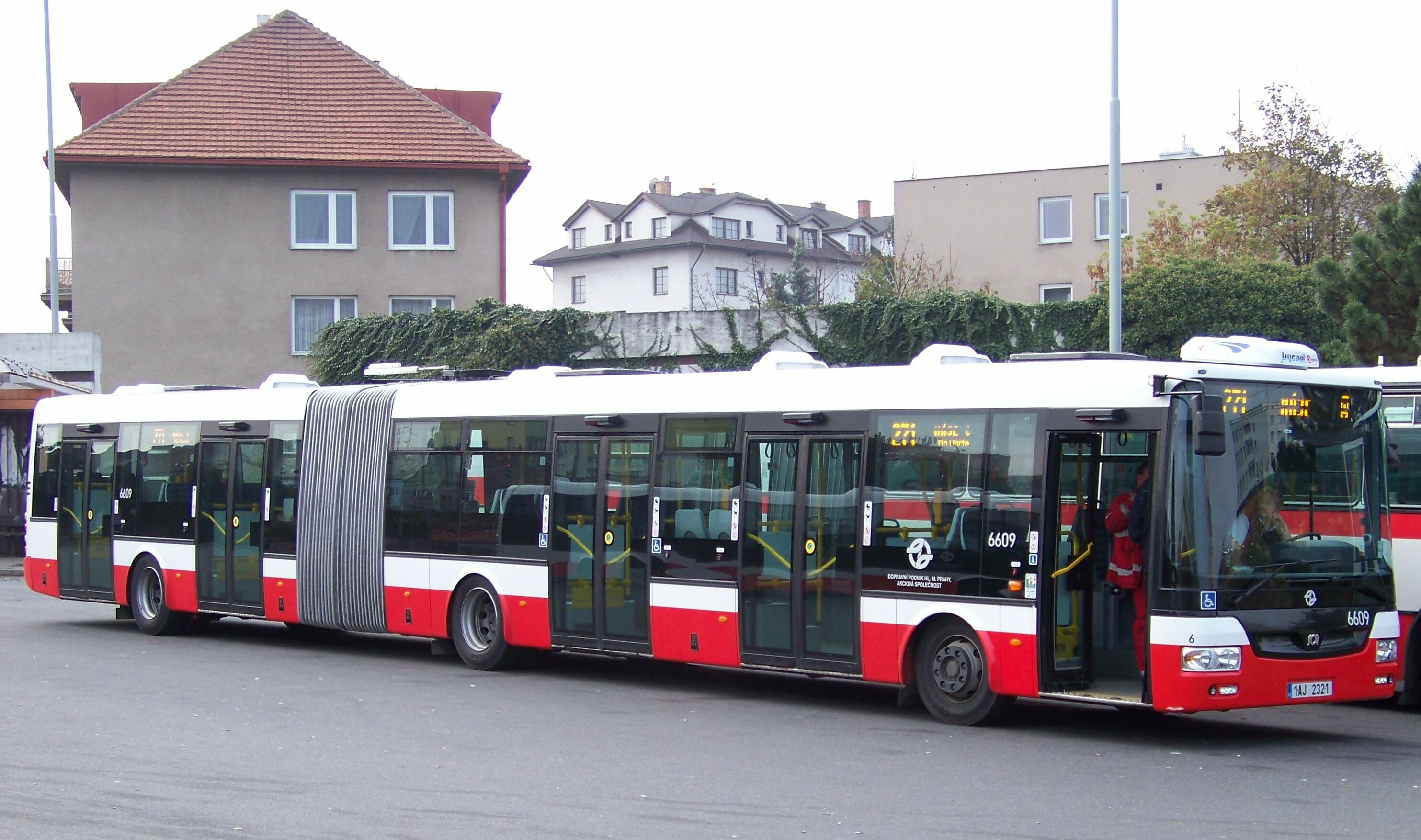
- SOR NB18 operated by Prague transport company

Overview
- Manufacturer: SOR

Body and chassis
- Doors: 5 or 3 doors
- Floor type: low-floor
- Chassis: Integral

Powertrain
- Engine: Iveco Cursor F2BE3681B Euro V
- Capacity: 64 to 80 seated
- Power output: 243 kW (326 hp)
- Transmission: ZF 6-speed automatic Allison 6-speed automatic

Dimensions
- Length: 18,750 mm (738.2 in)
- Width: 2,550 mm (100.4 in)
- Height: 2,900 mm (114.2 in)
- Curb weight: 14,500 kg (32,000 lb)

Chronology
- Successor: SOR NS 18

The SOR NB18 is a low-floor articulated single-decker bus produced by Czech bus manufacturer SOR since 2008. Since 2009 bus also comes with hybrid drive SOR NBH 18. In many towns they currently replace Karosa B 741 and Karosa B 941.

== Construction features ==
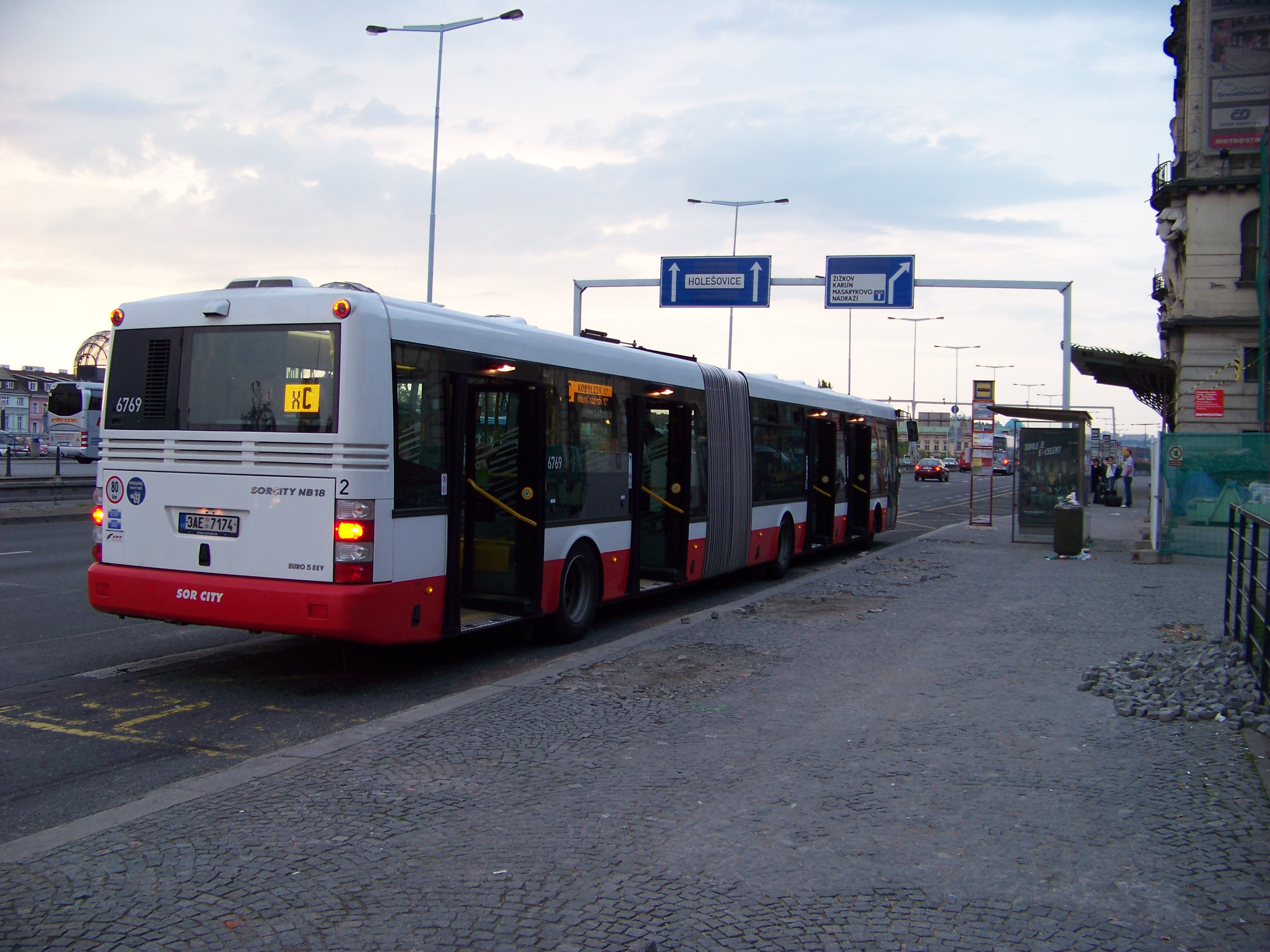
SOR NB 18 rear

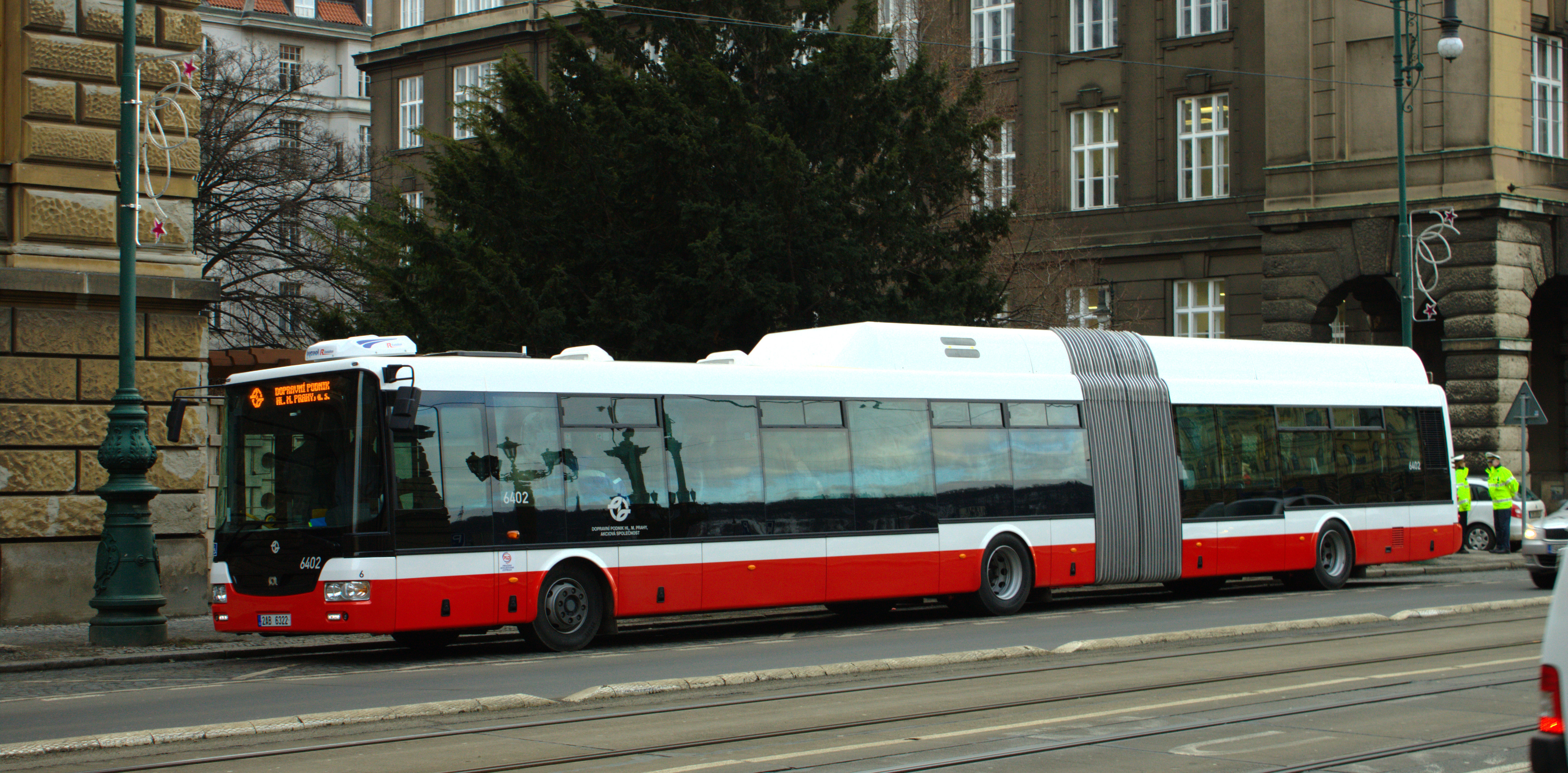
SOR NBH 18 rear

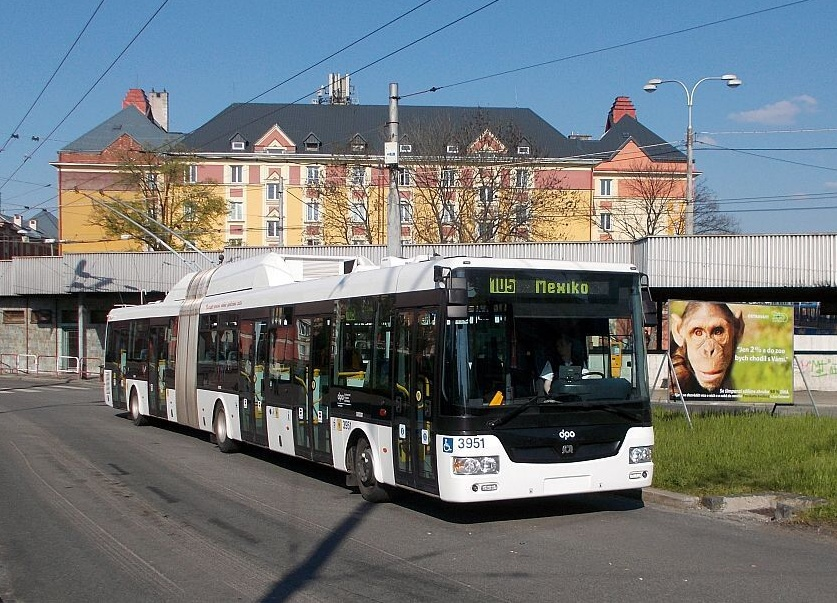
SOR TNB 18

SOR NB18 is derived from the SOR NB 12 rigid single-decker bus. It is made of two rigid sections linked by a pivoting joint. Engine and automatic transmission are located in the left rear corner of the bus. Inside are used plastic Ster seats. Rear axle is ZF brand, as well as medium axle, the front axle is of its own production with independent wheel suspension. Only third C axle is propulsed, meaning that this articulated bus has pusher configuration. Body of the vehicle is welded from steel-voltage profiles, flashings from the outside and interior are lined with plastic sheeting. The floor of the bus is at a height of 360 mm above the ground. On the right side of the bus are five doors (first are narrower than other doors).

The diesel hybrid bus NBH 18 is derived from NB 18, but it has hybrid drive (parallel hybrid drive unit from Allison allows accumulation of braking energy), which is then used for start-up by two electric motors built into Automatic transmission.

In Czechia are also produced trolleybuses SOR TNB 18 and Škoda 31Tr SOR in Škoda Transportation, which are based on SOR NB 18 bodies.

== Production and operation ==
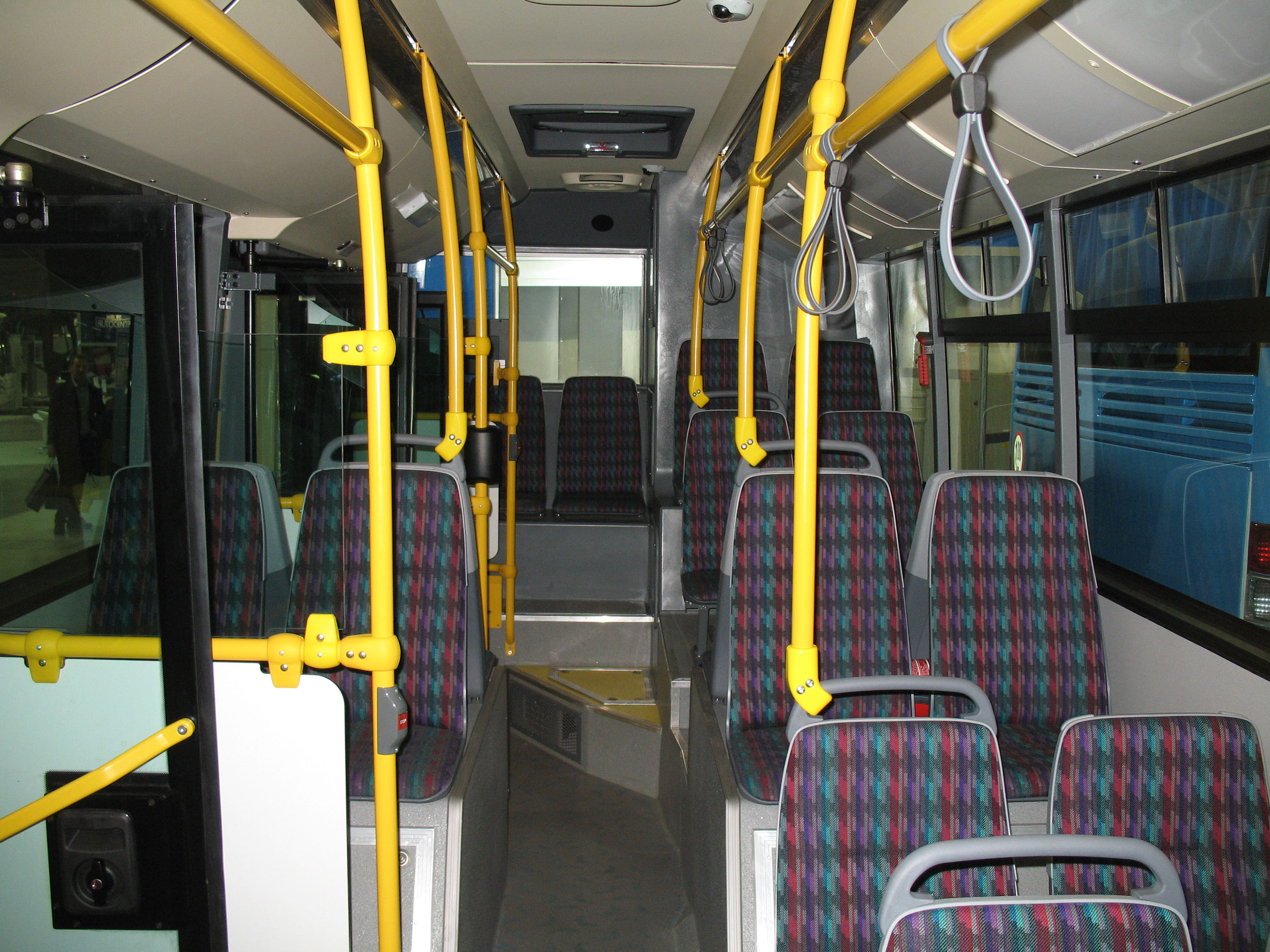
Interior of SOR NB18

In 2006 SOR introduced in Brno on Autotec a completely new range of low-floor buses. Rigid single-decker bus NB 12 and articulated single-decker bus NB 18 were presented with their prototype after the prototypes hav done both test drive through cities in Czechia and Slovakia. The second bus type NB 18 was introduced at Autotec 2008 and from first prototype it differs with modified design. Serial production began in the fall of 2008, and in January 2009 was delivered first serial bus NB18 to Nitra.

== See also ==
- List of buses
