= SOR Libchavy =

Czech manufacturer of buses for urban, intercity and tourist service, and trolleybuses

SOR s.r.o
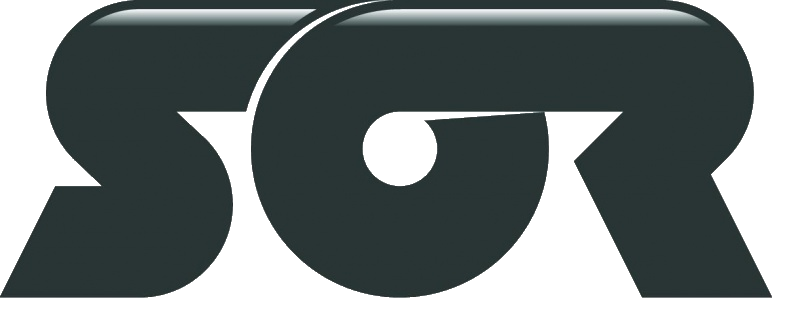

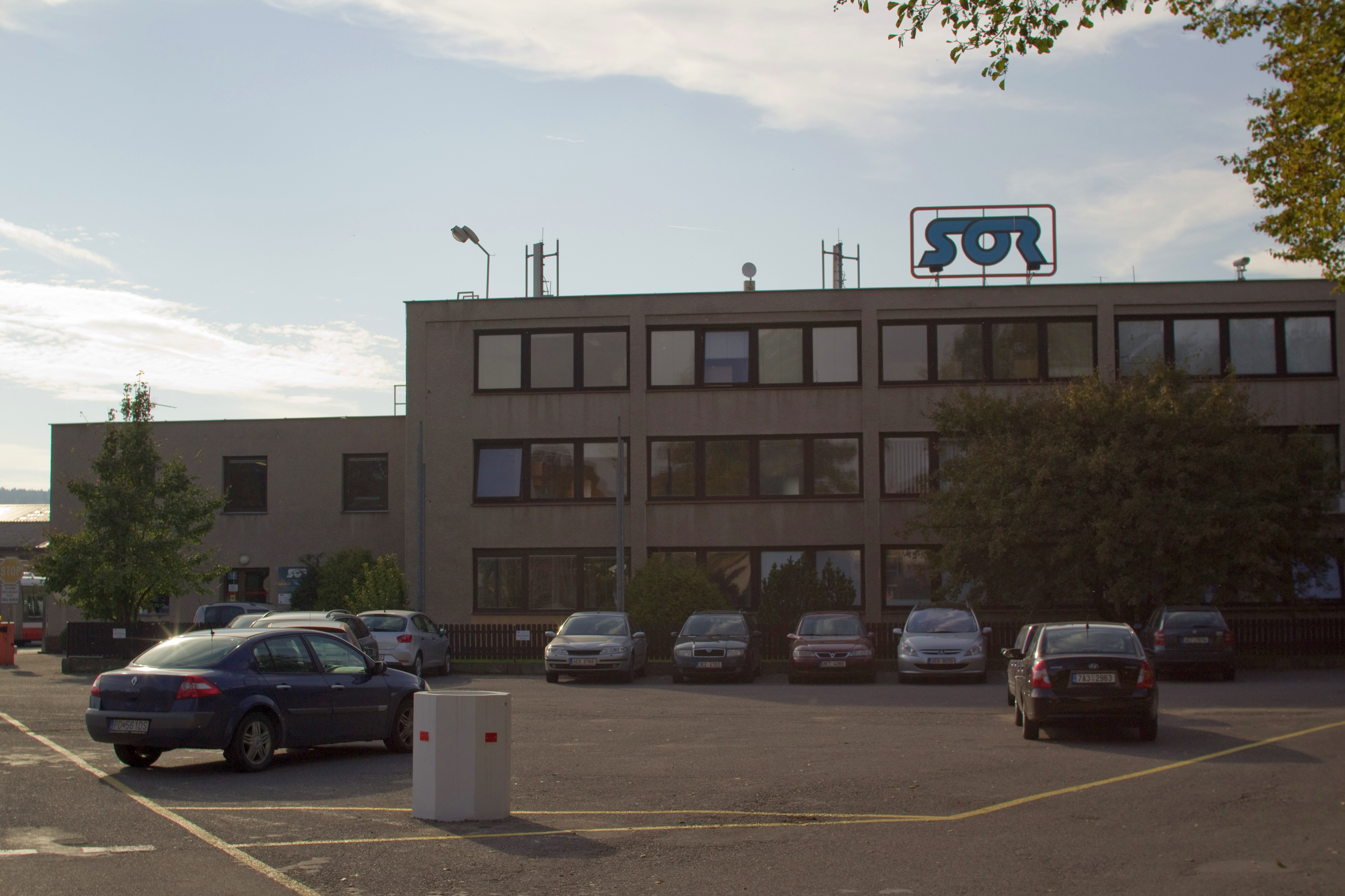
- SOR factory in Libchavy
- Founded: 1990
- Headquarters: Libchavy, Czech Republic
- Area served: Worldwide
- Key people: Jaroslav Trnka
- Products: Buses, trolleybuses
- Revenue: 3,373,656,000 Czech koruna (2020)
- Operating income: 211,590,000 Czech koruna (2020)
- Net income: 164,712,000 Czech koruna (2020)
- Total assets: 2,191,793,000 Czech koruna (2020)
- Owner: J&T
- Number of employees: 739 (2020)
- Website: www.sor.cz/en/

SOR Libchavy (Full called as Sdružení Opravárenství a Rozvoje) is a Czech manufacturer of buses for urban, intercity and tourist traffic and trolleybuses. It was established in Libchavy in 1991.

== History ==
Until 1990, the company produced and repaired agricultural machinery. Then privatization took place and the new company was registered on 6 December 1991. The manufacturer was established with business intent to focus on the design, production, sale and service of buses. The company management decided to develop a 7.5 m long bus which would combine SOR's own body and chassis with engine-gearbox assembly from prominent world manufacturers.

The production of buses was introduced by Jaroslav Trnka, the former director of Karosa Vysoké Mýto, and his team. Design works were initiated at the end of 1992 and already at the end of 1993, the first buses with Perkins motor and Voith gearbox were sold in 1994 to Kadaň. The company produced a wide range of different-sized buses (8.5 m, 9.5 m, 10.5 m, 12 m, 13.5 m and 18 m long).

SOR Libchavy is currently producing about 750 vehicles per year and is the second largest manufacturer of buses in the Czech Republic, behind Iveco-Karosa. About one third is delivered abroad. The company has offices in the Baltics, Slovakia, Poland, Romania and Russia. Their buses run for example in the Czech capital Prague, or Slovak capital Bratislava. Also, more than 100 electric buses were delivered in Romania. They are operating in the following cities : Brașov (60 buses delivered between 2020 and 2021, 50 ENS12 and 10 EBN8), Turda (20 buses since 2019, 10 EBN11 and 10 EBN9.5), Zalău ( 20 buses since 2020, 10 ENS12 and 10 EBN9.5), Slatina (8 ENS12 buses since 2022), Ploiești (9 ENS12 buses since 2023), Bistrița (10 EBN9.5 buses delivered in 2022, waiting to enter operation, for the moment in testing), Alba Iulia (13 ENS12 buses since 2023), Drobeta Turnu-Severin ( 6 EBN11 Buses delivered in 2023, entered in service in December 2023), Rovinari ( 3 EBN8 buses in 2022, waiting to enter operation, for the moment in testing).

20 electric buses EBN 9.5, as well as 15 model TNS 12 trolleybuses are in operation in Ruse, Bulgaria. Additional SOR vehicles also operate in the Bulgarian cities of Pernik and Sliven.

It manufactures medium-class buses with occupation rate from 25 to 51 sitting and total occupation rate up to 161 passengers. These buses are manufactured on the basis of the company own design. As a matter of course, they provide service, repairs and sale of spare parts.

In 2015, SOR Libchavy recorded an increase of production by 31% and revenues increased by 42%. The company currently sells (2022) city (SOR NS, NSG, IBN, IBNG), intercity (SOR IC, ICN, ICNG, LH) and electric buses (SOR EBN, NS) and trolleybuses (SOR TNS).

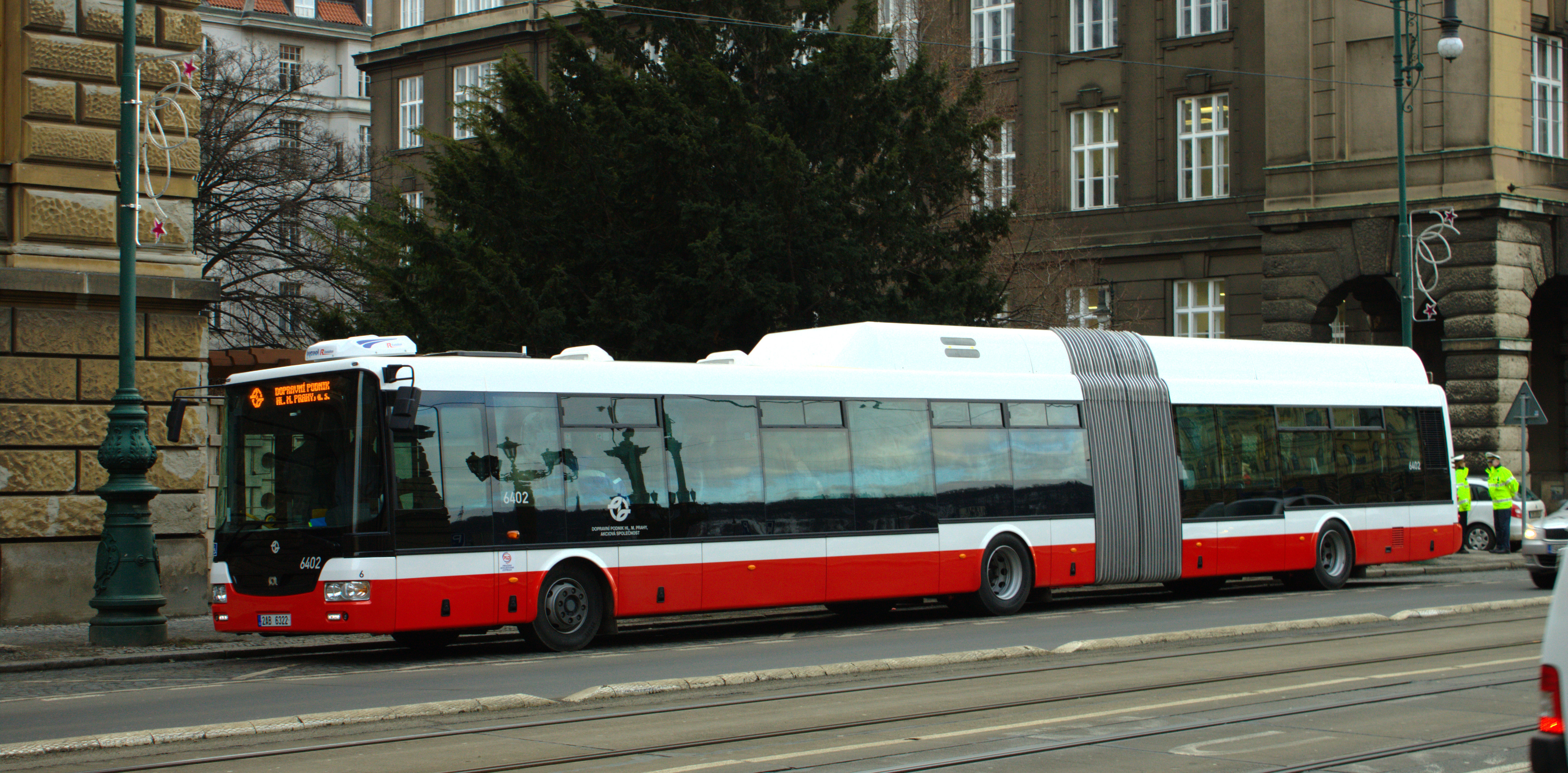
Low-floor articulated city bus SOR NBH 18

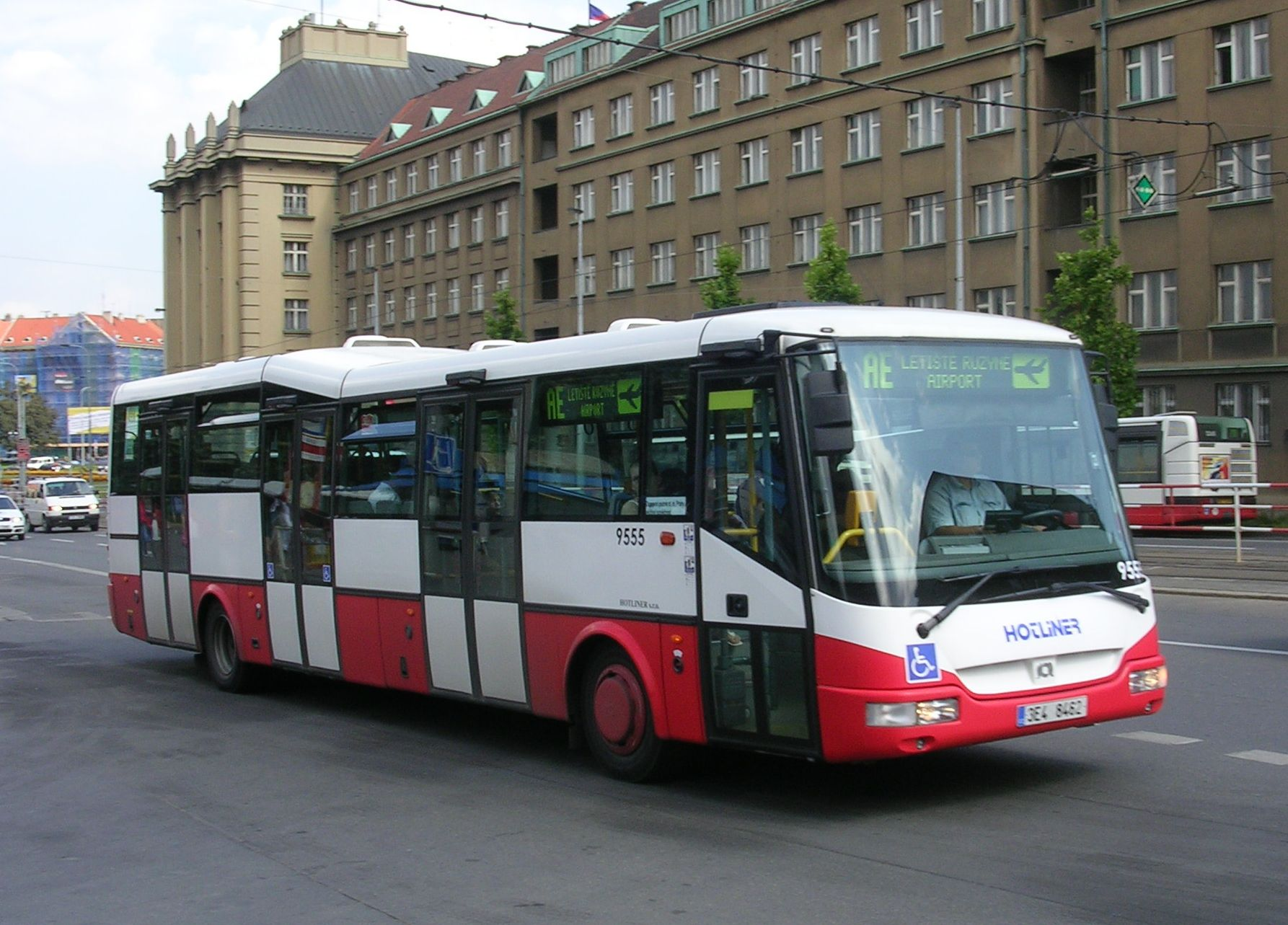
City bus SOR BN 12

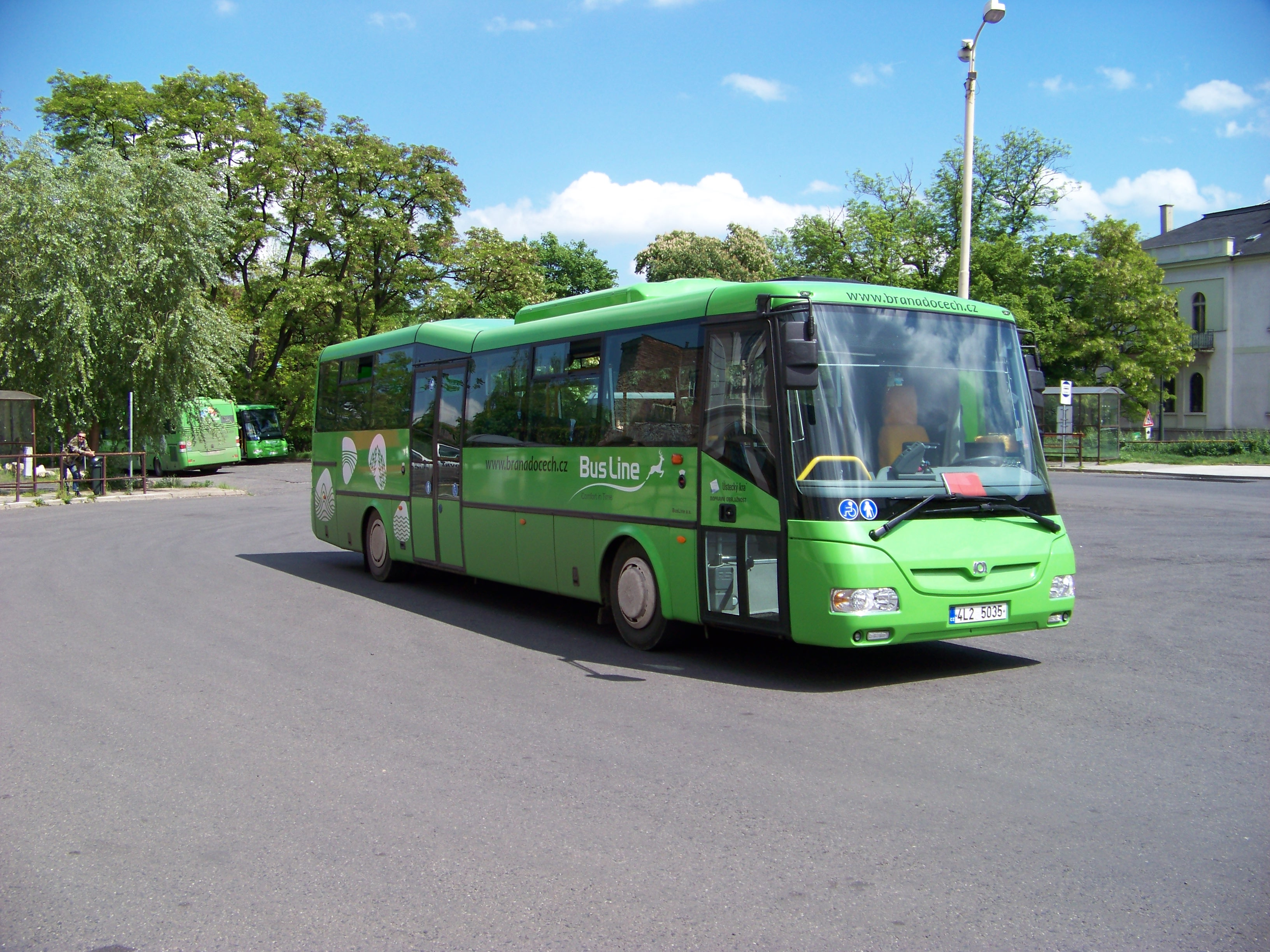
Intercity bus SOR CN 10,5

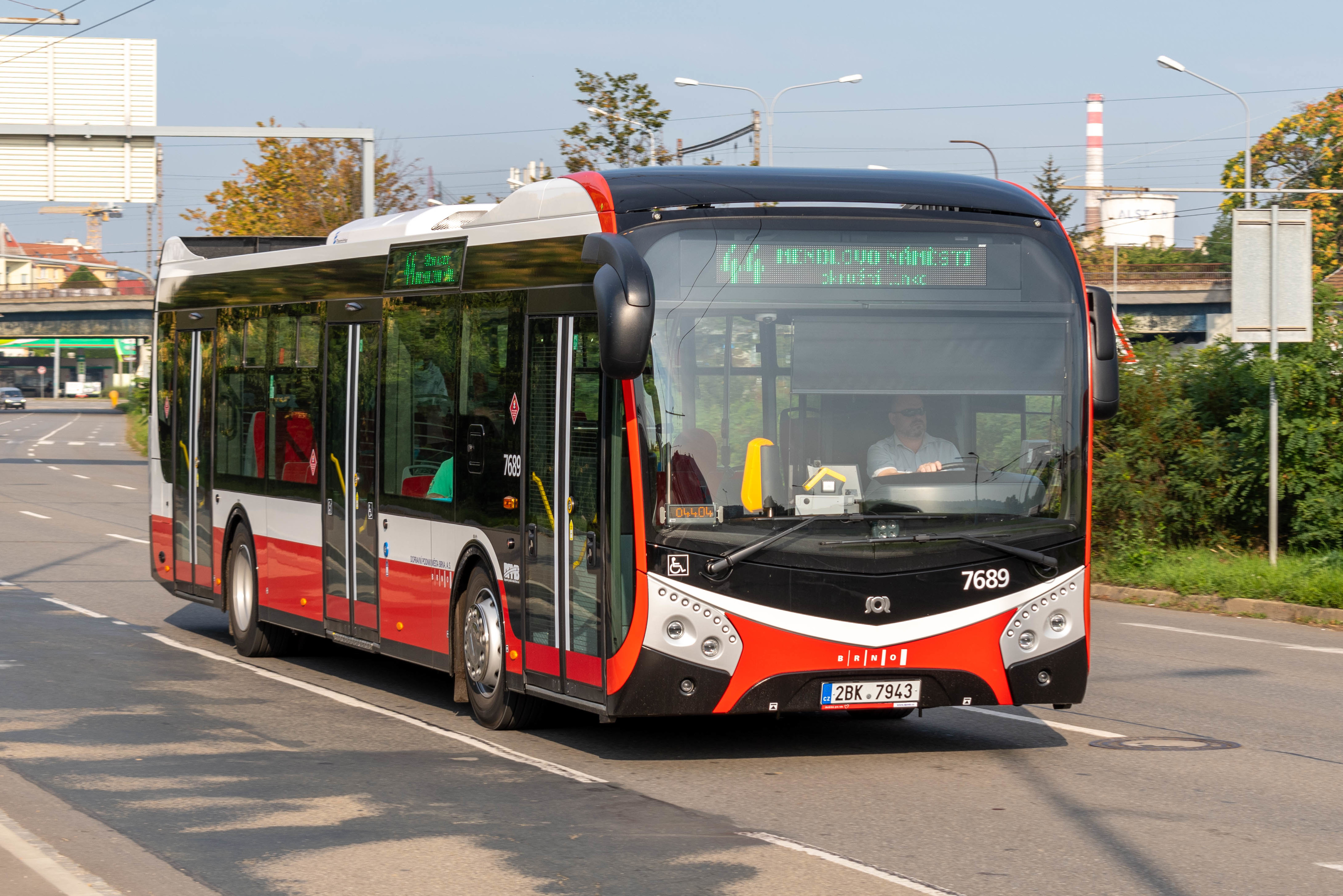
City bus SOR NS 12 in Brno on bus line 44

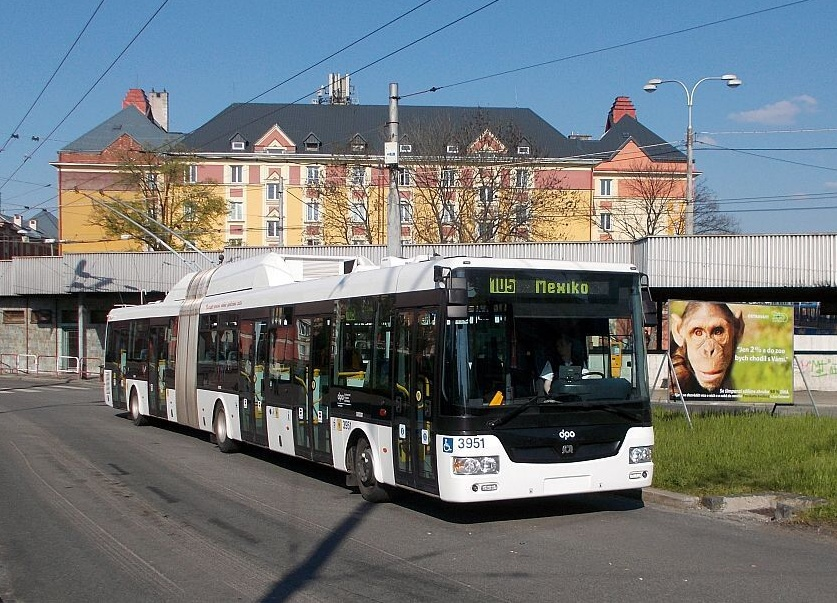
Trolleybus SOR TNB 18

== See also ==
- Karosa
- TEDOM
