= Karosa B 961 =

Czech articulated bus

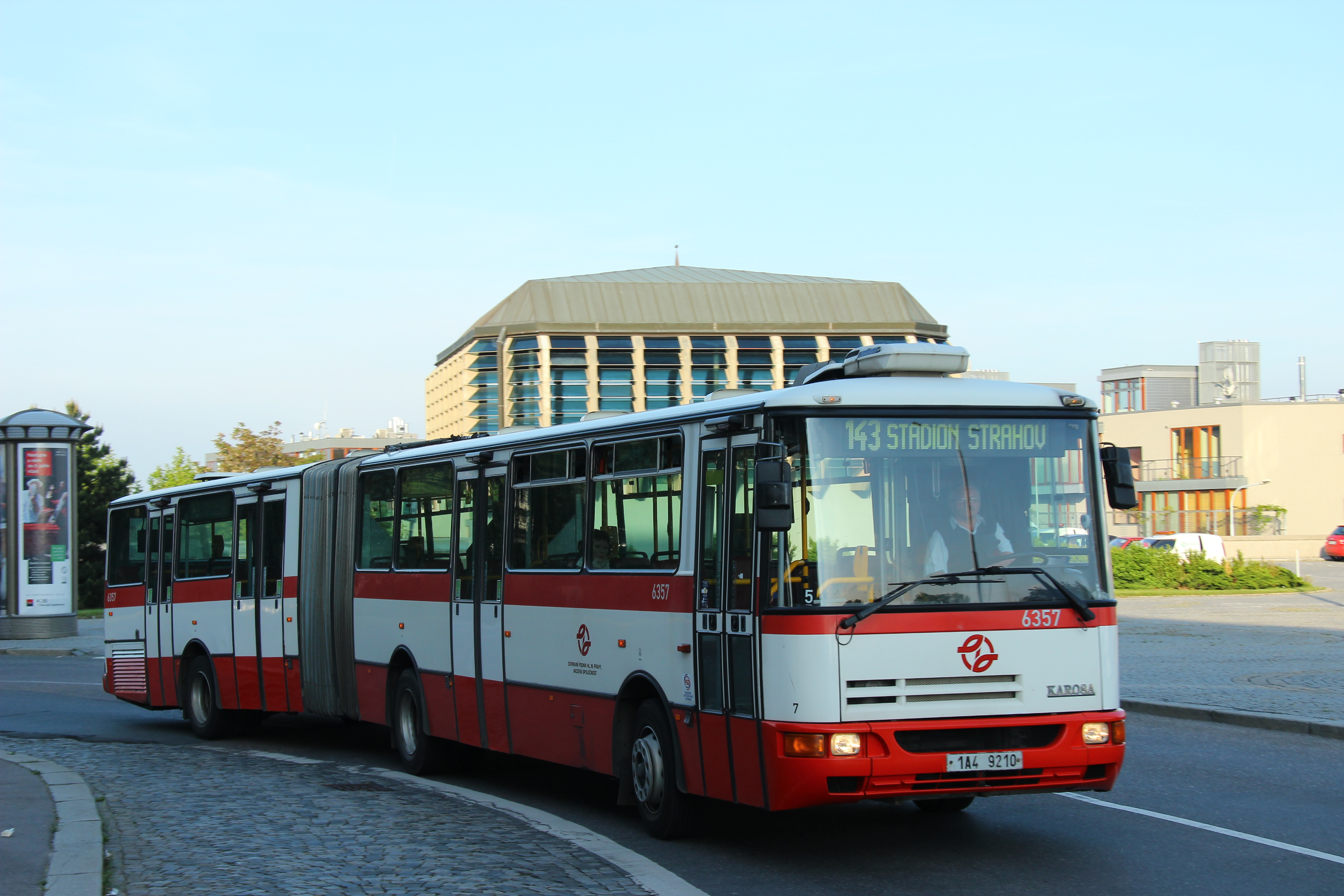
- Karosa B961 no.6357 from year 2002 of Prague transport company

Overview
- Manufacturer: Karosa

Body and chassis
- Doors: 4, air-operated
- Floor type: High-floor
- Chassis: semi-self-supporting with frame

Powertrain
- Engine: Iveco Cursor 8 Euro III V6 Diesel engine
- Power output: 210 kW (282 hp)
- Transmission: Voith DIWA 3-speed automatic Voith DIWA 4-speed automatic ZF 4-speed automatic (prototype)

Dimensions
- Length: 17,590 mm (692.5 in)
- Width: 2,500 mm (98.4 in)
- Height: 3,165 mm (124.6 in)
- Curb weight: 13,870 kg (30,580 lb) (B 961); 14,400 kg (31,700 lb) (B 961 E)

Chronology
- Predecessor: Karosa B 941
- Successor: Irisbus Citelis

Karosa B 961 is an articulated urban bus produced from 2002 to 2006 by bus manufacturer Karosa from the Czech Republic. A modernised version, Karosa B 961E, was introduced in 2003. In many towns, they replaced Karosa B 741. It was the last high-floor bus built in Karosa, before it was renamed to Iveco Czech Republic.

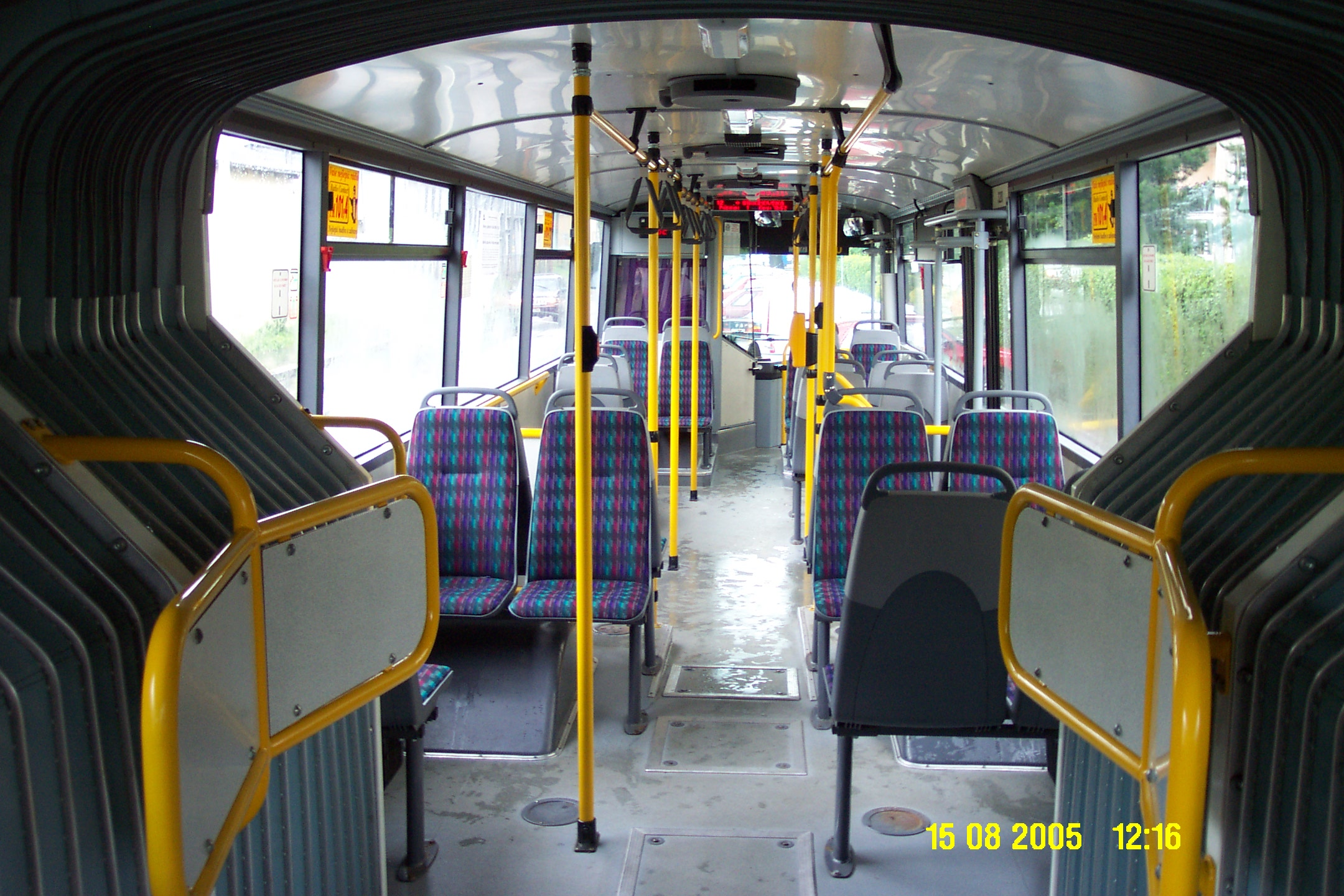
Interior of Karosa B 961 E

== Construction features ==
Karosa B 961 is a model of the Karosa 900 series. The B 961 is derived from its predecessor the Karosa B 941, and also unified with city bus models such as the B 951 and the B 952. The body was assembled to the skeleton, which has undergone a dip stage, sheets were galvanized and painted and then to have it installed additional components. The body is made of two rigid sections linked by a pivoting joint. The body is semi-self-supporting with frame and engine with automatic gearbox is placed in the rear part. The engine drives only the third C axle, meaning that this articulated bus has a pusher configuration. The front, middle and rear axles are solid. All the axles are mounted on air suspension. On the right side are four doors (first and last are narrower than middle doors). Inside are used plastic Vogelsitze or Ster seats. The driver's cab is separated from the rest of the vehicle by a glazed partition. In the middle part and in the rear part, is room for a pram or wheelchair. Buses have an enclosed design of the turntable.

== Production and operation ==
Prototype of Karosa B 961 was built in 2000. Later it was given to Prague Transport Company as a help after floods in Prague in 2002. It operates until now with number 6360. It has ZF gearbox and Iveco engine.
Serial production started in the year 2002, when first buses were delivered to first operators in Czech Republic and Slovakia, and continued until 2006. Since 2003 were buses produced only modernised version B 961 E, which had glass glued to skeleton, instead of glass mounted in rubber and better ventilation of the engine compartment. The last B 961 E, which left the production line in 2006, is now operated by Martin Uher in Prague, Czech Republic under the number 1147.

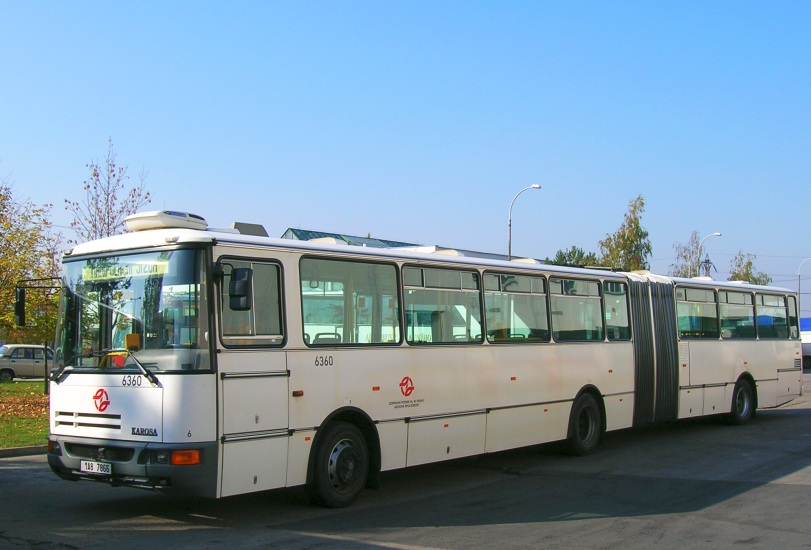
Prototype of Karosa B 961 from the year 2000

== Historical vehicles ==
- Private collector (1 car no. 17, ex Transport Company Tabor)
- Transport Company Prague (1 car no. 6366)

== See also ==
- Technical specs on manufacturers page (on web archive)
- List of buses
