= Karosa B 931 =

Type of Czech urban bus

Karosa B931
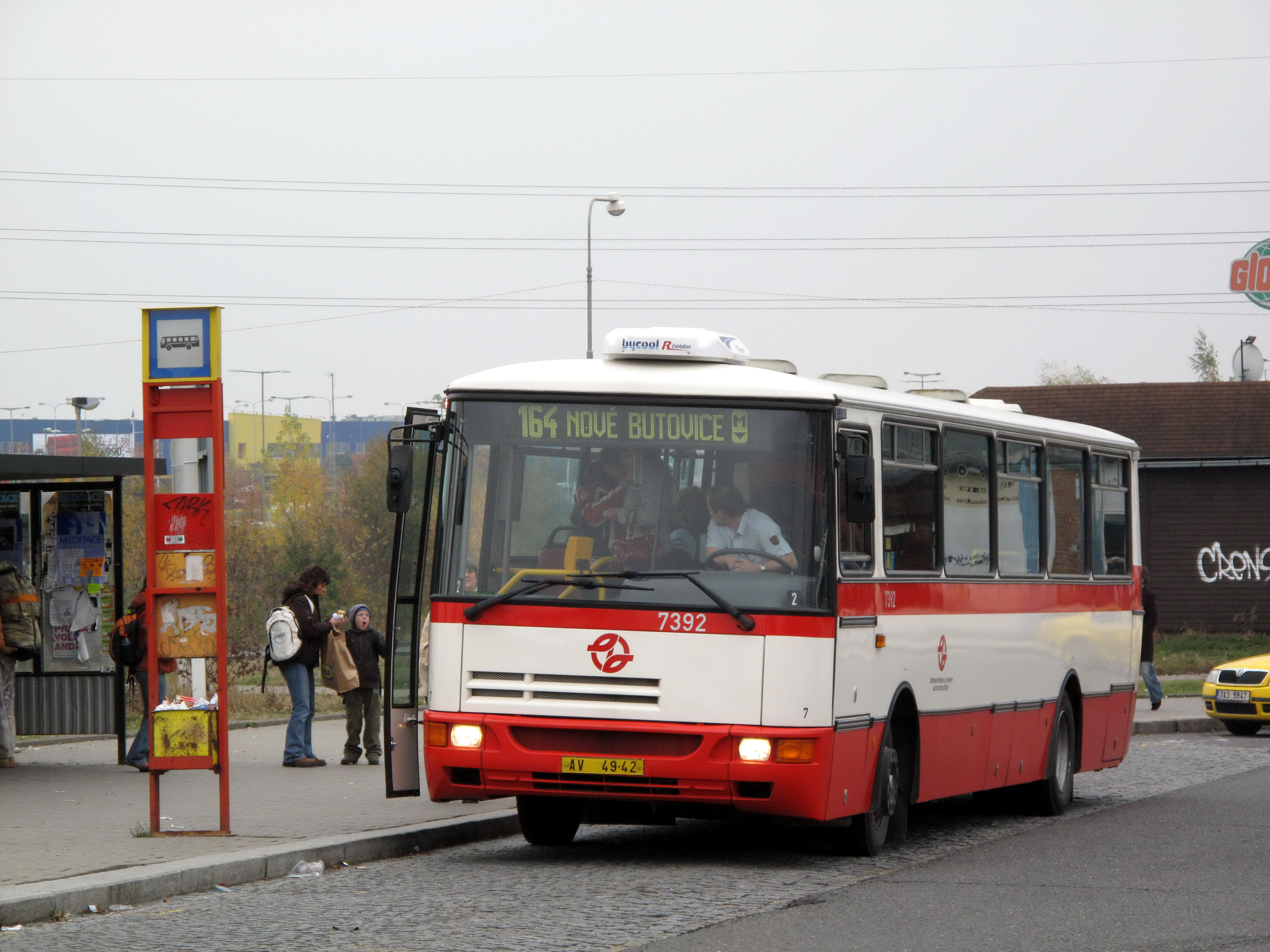
- Karosa B931 no.7392 from 1996 of Prague transport company

Overview
- Manufacturer: Karosa

Body and chassis
- Doors: 3, air-operated
- Floor type: High-floor
- Chassis: semi-self-supporting with frame

Powertrain
- Engine: LIAZ ML636N V6 Diesel engine Renault MIHR 062045 V6 Diesel engine
- Capacity: 31 sitting/63 standing
- Power output: 175 kW (235 hp) (LIAZ); 152 kW (204 hp) – 188 kW (252 hp) kW (Renault MIHR 062045)
- Transmission: Voith DIWA 3-speed automatic ZF 4-speed automatic ZF 5-speed automatic

Dimensions
- Length: 11,345 mm (446.7 in)
- Width: 2,500 mm (98.4 in)
- Height: 3,165 mm (124.6 in)
- Curb weight: 9,800 kg (21,600 lb) – 10,500 kg (23,100 lb)

Chronology
- Predecessor: Karosa B 731
- Successor: Karosa B 951

Karosa B 931 is an urban bus produced from 1996 to 2002 by bus manufacturer Karosa from the Czech Republic, in the years of 1996 to 2002. An upgraded version, B931E, was introduced in 1999. It was succeeded by Karosa B 951 in 2002.

== Construction features ==
Karosa B 931 is a model of the Karosa 900 series. The B 931 is derived from the Karosa B 731 city bus, and also unified with city bus models such as the B 941 and the B 932. The body is semi-self-supporting with frame and engine with automatic gearbox in the rear part. The engine drives only the rear axle. The front axle is independent, rear axle is solid. All axles are mounted on Air suspension. On the right side are three doors (first are narrower than middle doors). Inside are used plastic Vogelsitze or Fainsa seats. The driver's cab is separated from the rest of the vehicle by a glazed partition (prototype BK1 made in the year 1995 didn't have this partition). In the middle part is room for a pram or wheelchair.

== Production and operation ==
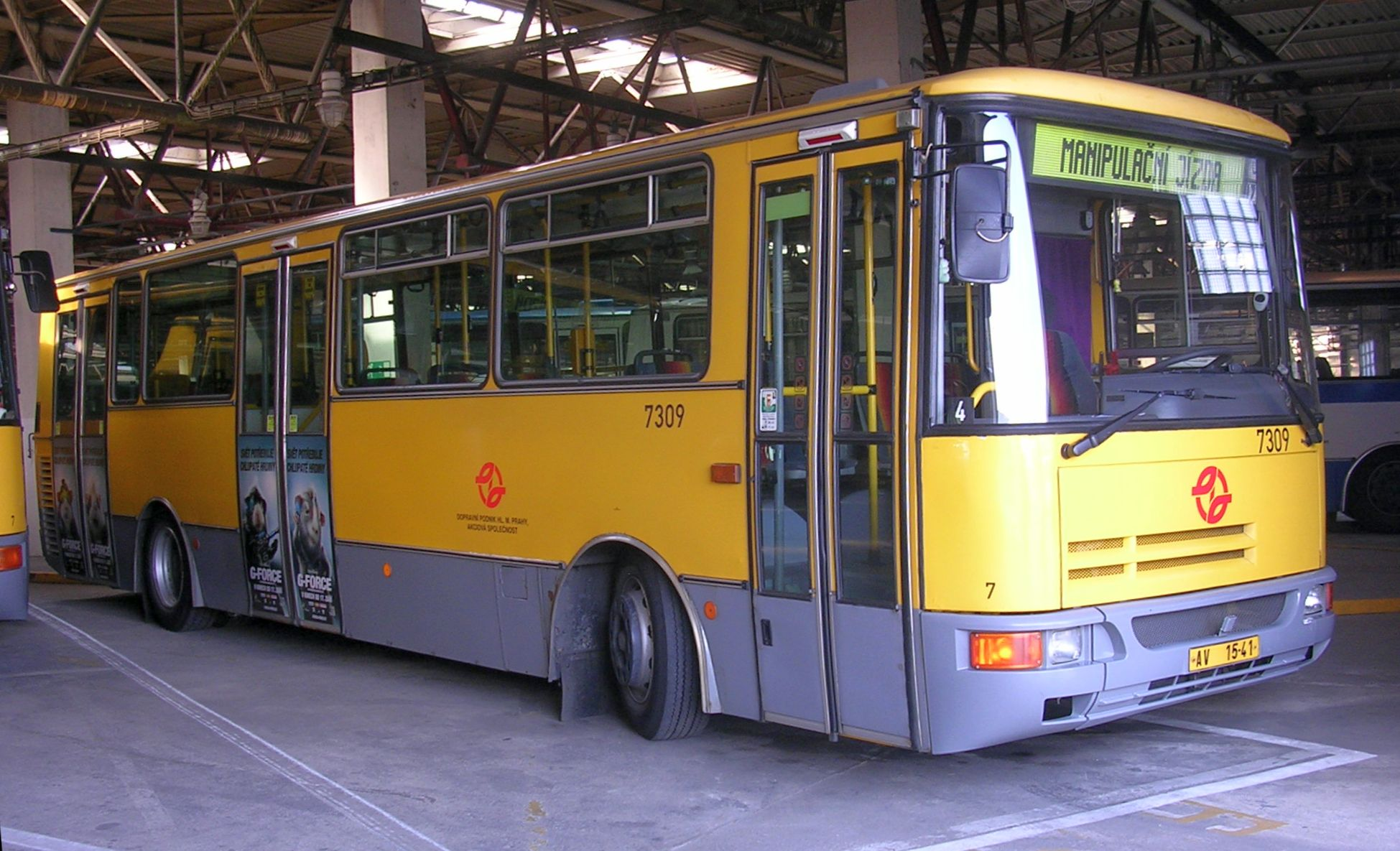
One of the first ten buses B 931 made for Prague transport Company at the end of 1995

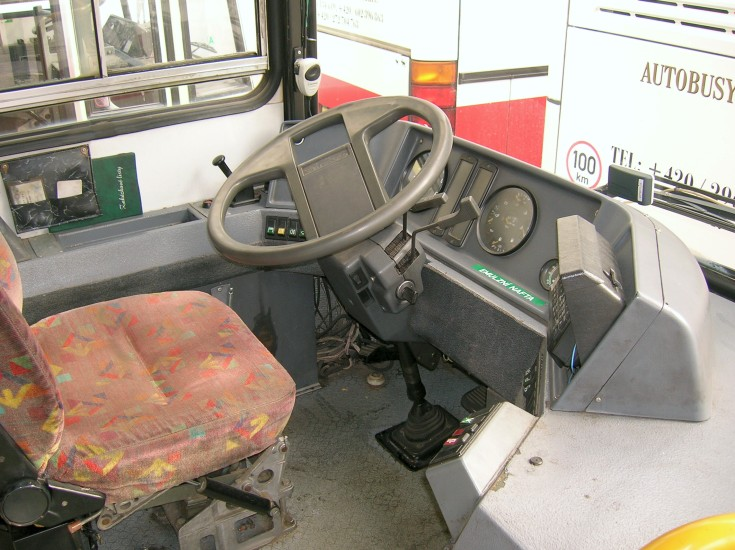
Drivers cab of prototype of Karosa B 931

Prototype of Karosa B931 was built in 1995. It was bought in 1996 by Prague transport company and operated until 2012.
First ten serial buses were made at the end of 1995 for Prague transport company.
In 1996 started serial production, which continued until 2002. Since 1999 were buses produced only in modernised version B931E, which has new solid front axle Škoda-LIAZ, floor lowered in front part by 10 centimeters, ABS and ASR.

Currently, number of Karosa B931 buses is decreasing, due to supply of new low-floor buses, for example by SOR NB 12 made in Czech Republic.

{Clear}

== Historical vehicles ==
- Unknown owner (bus ex. DP Plzeň no. 433)
- Technical museum in Brno (1 bus B931.1675 no. 7425, year 1998)

== See also ==
- List of buses
