= TEDOM Kronos 122 =

Overview
- Manufacturer: TEDOM

Body and chassis
- Doors: 2 doors
- Floor type: Low floor

Powertrain
- Engine: TEDOM CNG
- Power output: 210 kW (282 hp)
- Transmission: ZF 6-speed automatic Voith 4-speed automatic

Dimensions
- Length: 11,990 mm (472.0 in)
- Width: 2,550 mm (100.4 in)
- Height: 3,333 mm (131.2 in)

TEDOM Kronos 122 is a low-floor intercity bus produced by the now defunct bus manufacturing division of the company TEDOM from the Czech Republic in 2006, when it was replaced by TEDOM L 12.

== Construction features ==
The Kronos 122 is a low-floor bus (floor height 340 mm above the ground). Frame chassis is welded thin-walled hollow sections of stainless steel. The cladding is formed from aluminum sheet faces the vehicle and the roof is made of fiberglass.

== Production and operation ==
Two buses were made in 2006. The company TEDOM ceased bus production in 2012.

== See also ==
- List of buses
