= Karosa B 941 =

Czech articulated urban bus

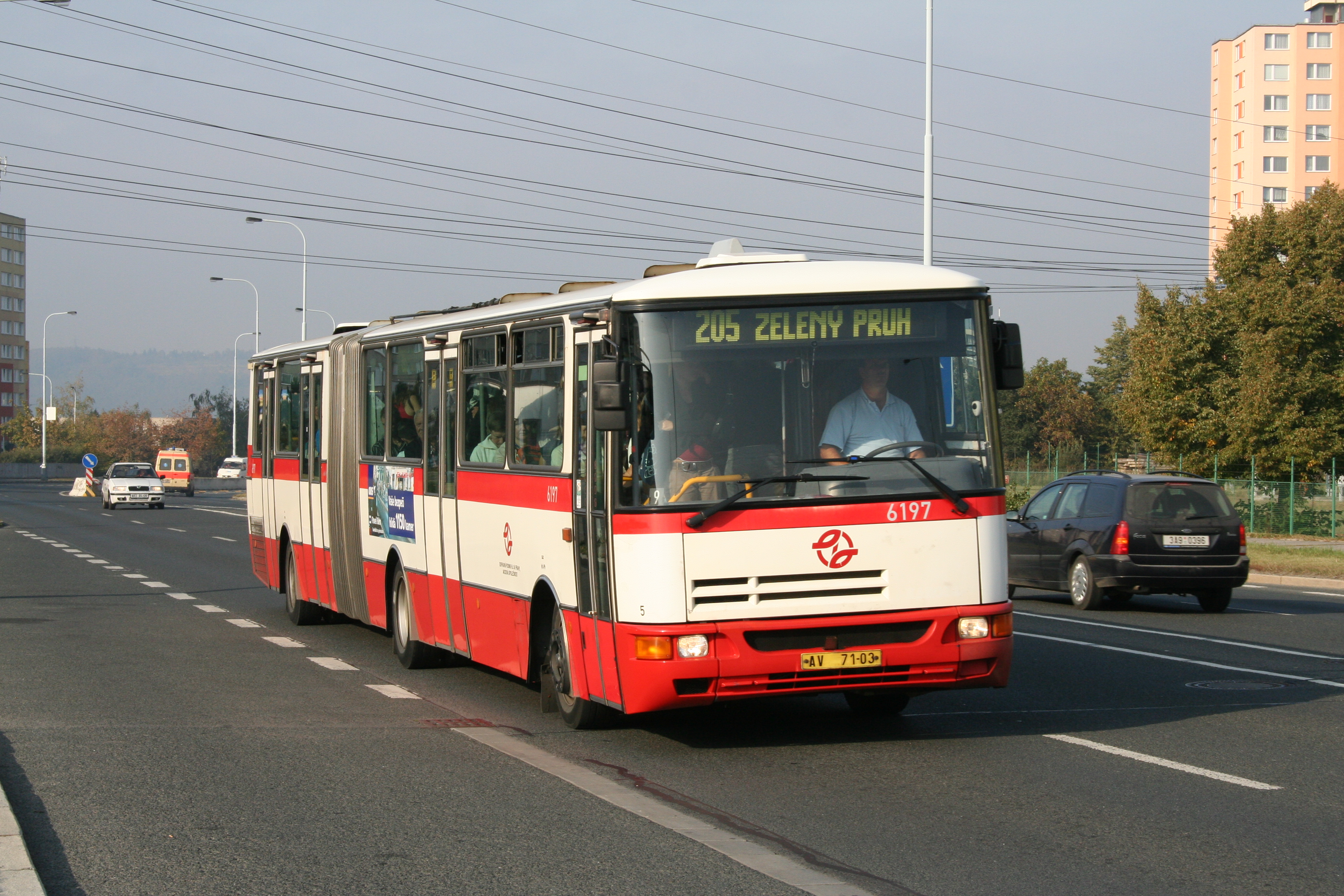
- Karosa B941 made in the year 1997, retired in 2010, operated by Prague transport company

Overview
- Manufacturer: Karosa

Body and chassis
- Doors: 4, air-operated
- Floor type: High-floor
- Chassis: semi-self-supporting with frame

Powertrain
- Engine: LIAZ ML636N Euro II V6 Diesel engine Renault MIHR 062045 V6 Diesel engine
- Capacity: 42 sitting 102 standing
- Power output: 175 kW (235 hp) (LIAZ); 186 kW (249 hp) - 217 kW (291 hp) (Renault)
- Transmission: Voith DIWA 3-speed automatic ZF 4-speed automatic

Dimensions
- Length: 17,615 mm (693.5 in)
- Width: 2,500 mm (98.4 in)
- Height: 3,165 mm (124.6 in)
- Curb weight: 14,300 kg (31,500 lb) (B 941); 14,400 kg (31,700 lb) (B 941 E)

Chronology
- Predecessor: Karosa B 741
- Successor: Karosa B 961

Karosa B 941 is an articulated urban bus produced from 1997 to 2002 by bus manufacturer Karosa from the Czech Republic. An upgraded version, Karosa B941E, was introduced in 1999. In many towns they replaced Ikarus 280 made in Hungary. In production was succeeded by Karosa B 961 in 2002.

== Construction features ==
Karosa B 941 is a model of the Karosa 900 series. The B 941 is derived from its predecessor the Karosa B 741, and also unified with city bus models such as the B 931 and the B 932. It is made of two rigid sections linked by a pivoting joint. The body is semi-self-supporting with frame and engine with automatic gearbox is placed in the rear part. The engine drives only the third C axle, meaning that this articulated bus has a pusher configuration. The front axle is independent, the middle and rear axles are solid. All the axles are mounted on air suspension. On the right side are four doors (first and last are narrower than middle doors). Inside are used plastic Vogelsitze or Fainsa seats. The driver's cab is separated from the rest of the vehicle by a glazed partition. In the middle part and in the rear part is room for a pram or wheelchair. The prototype made in 1995 has an open design of turntable, but serial produced buses have an enclosed design of the turntable.

== Production and operation ==
Prototype of Karosa B941 was built in the year 1995, and is operated until now in Brno, Czech Republic under number 2336.
Serial production started in 1997 and production continued until 2001. Since 1999 were buses produced only in modernised version B941E, which has new solid front axle Škoda-LIAZ, floor lowered in front part by 10 centimeters, ABS and ASR.
Between the years 1997 and 2001 was made 335 buses mainly for transport companies in Czech Republic and Slovakia.
Currently, number of Karosa B941/B941E buses is reduced, due to supply of new low-floor buses, for example by SOR NB 18 made in Czech Republic and Iveco Urbanway 18m made in France.

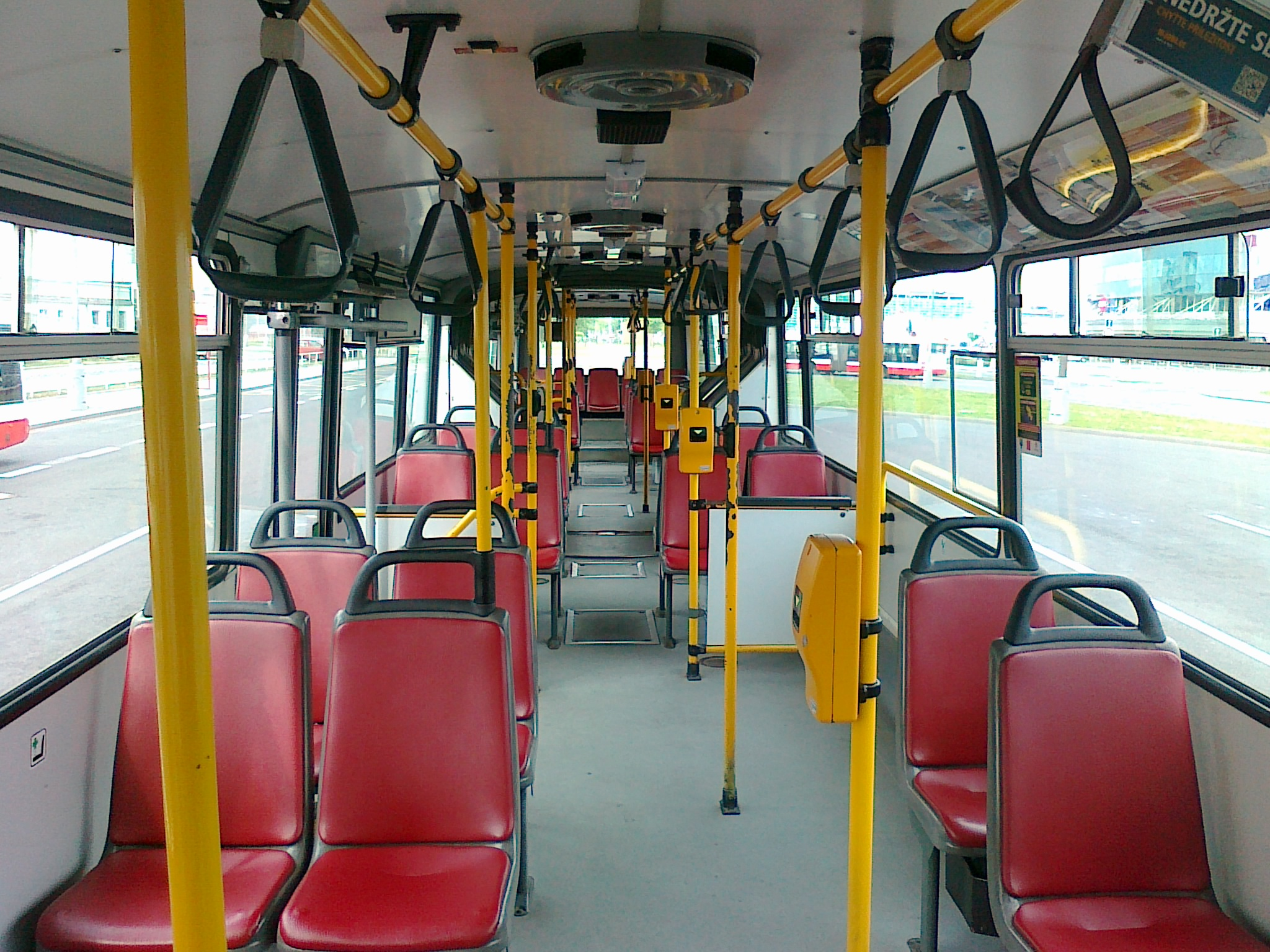
Interior of Karosa B 941 with Fainsa seats

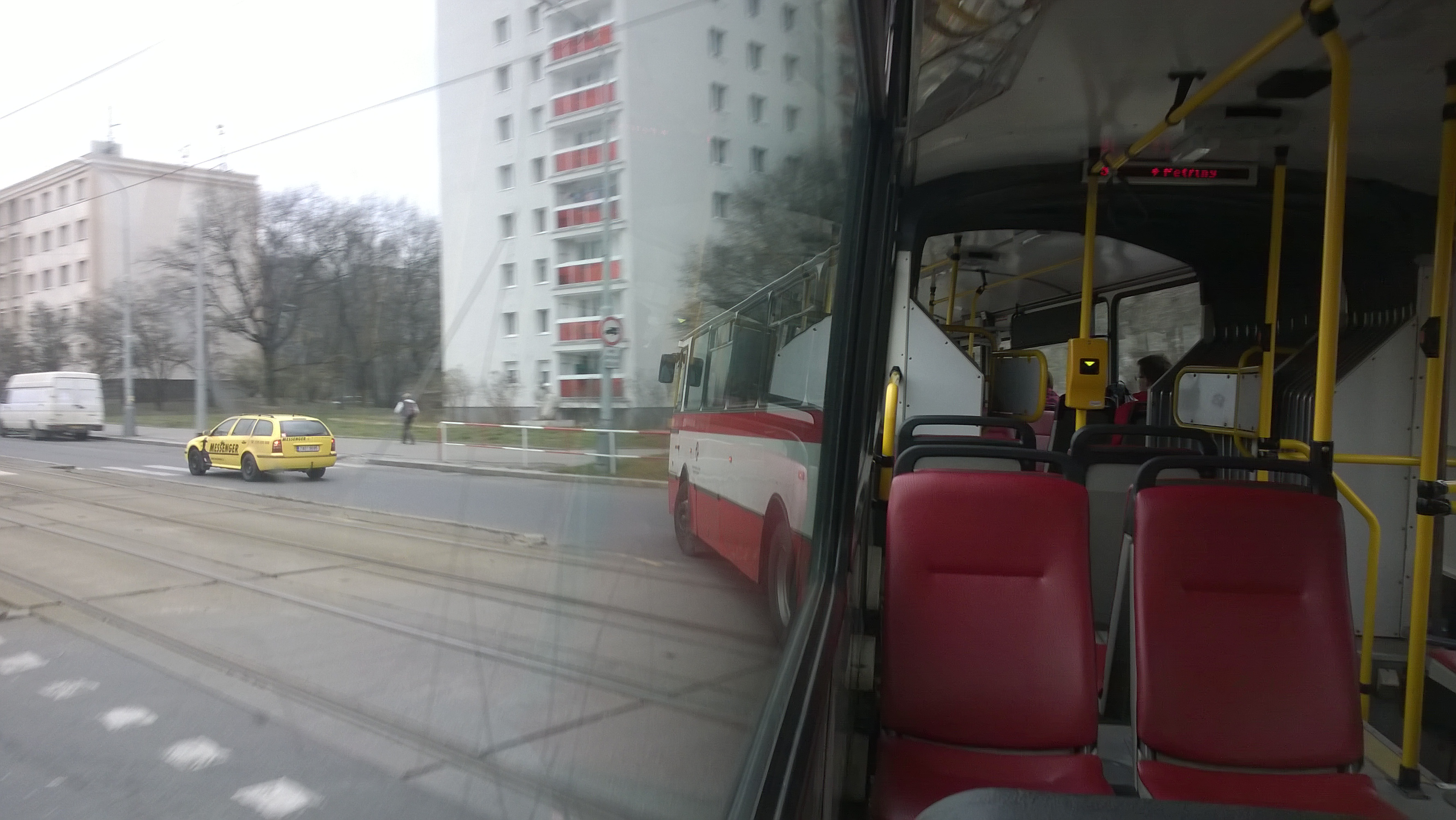
Interior of Karosa B 941E with Vogelsitze

== Historical vehicles ==
- private collector (1 cars no.267, ex Transport Company Hradec Králové)

== See also ==
- (in Czech) Article about Karosa B 941 a B 941E
- List of buses
