= Štěpánovice =

Štěpánovice may refer to places in the Czech Republic:

- Štěpánovice (Brno-Country District), a municipality and village in the South Moravian Region
- Štěpánovice (České Budějovice District), a municipality and village in the South Bohemian Region
- Štěpánovice, a village and part of Klatovy in the Plzeň Region
- Štěpánovice, a village and part of Rovensko pod Troskami in the Liberec Region
- Štěpánovice, a village and part of Výčapy in the Vysočina Region
