= Solaris Urbino 10 =

Polish 10,5 meters bus model

Solaris Urbino 10.5
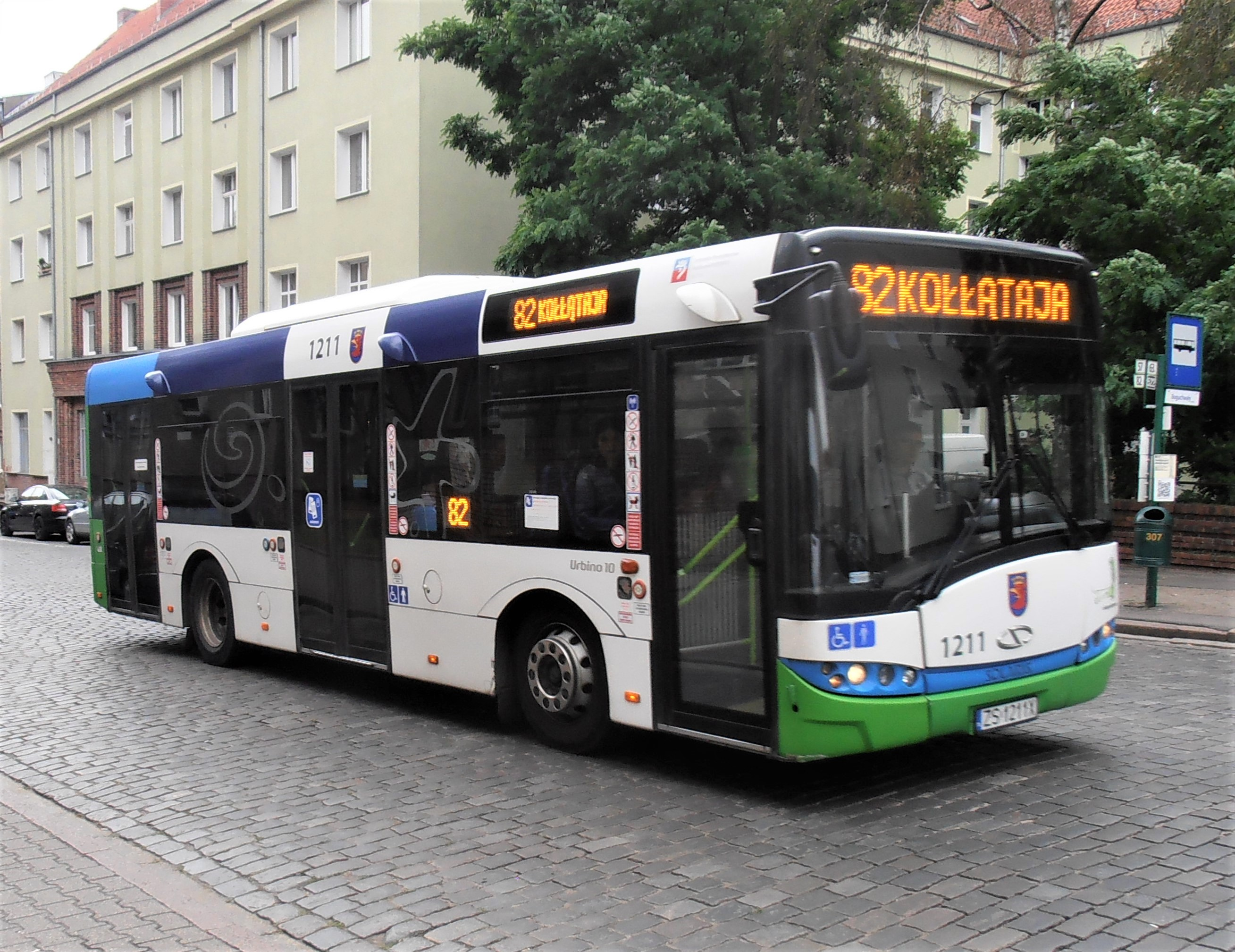

Overview
- Manufacturer: Solaris Bus & Coach
- Production: 2002–present
- Assembly: Bolechowo, Poland

Body and chassis
- Class: Single-deck city-bus
- Doors: 3 doors
- Floor type: Low floor

Powertrain
- Engine: Iveco NEF F4AE0681B; Cummins ISB6.7E6 250B; Cummins ISB6.7E6 280B
- Capacity: 91
- Power output: 177 / 184 / 206 kW (237 / 247 / 276 hp)
- Transmission: VOITH D851.3; ZF EcoLife

Dimensions
- Length: 9940 mm
- Width: 2550 mm
- Height: 2850 mm 3035 mm (with air conditioning)
- Curb weight: 15500 kg

Chronology
- Predecessor: Solaris Urbino 9

The Solaris Urbino 10.5 (or simply called as Solaris Urbino 10) is the 10-metre variant of the Solaris Urbino line of low-floor buses. It has been produced since 2002 by the Polish company Solaris Bus & Coach in Bolechowo near Poznań.

== History ==
The Neoplan Polska company had created a family of buses under the new brand name Solaris and started from the models with lengths of 9, 12, 15 and 18 metres. After an announcement by one of the cities in the tender for larger number of buses with lengths of 10 metres, Solaris Bus & Coach developed a new model with this length, initially offered under the brand Solaris Urbinetto 10. At the same time they abandoned the production of the shortest model Solaris Urbino 9.

Since the spring of 2005 the company has produced Solaris Urbino 10 in their third generation, but this is the second version of this bus. It is produced in versions with diesel engines (initially meeting emission standards of Euro 3 and Euro 4, Euro 5 or EEV), and since 2005 can be manufactured with a variety of gas-powered CNG engines by companies like Iveco and MAN. The basic engine used in this bus model is the Cummins ISB6.7E5 250B with a maximum power 180.5 kW (245 hp), meeting the requirements of the Euro 5 standard, with an option of stronger Cummins ISB6.7E5 285B unit with maximum power of 209 kW (284 hp). All axles come from ZF. The front axle is ZF RL 75 EC or optional ZF RL 85 A, rear axle ZF AV 132 is fitted as standard with a gearbox retarder. The chassis has a central lubrication system. The bus has the construction made from corrosion-resistant steel. Similarly the panels are from aluminium. The electrical system is based on the CAN bus system.

== Solaris Urbino 10 in Europe ==
Country	City	Operator	Number (by operator)	Number (by country)
Austria	Bad Ischl	Johann Sklona OPNV Pammesberger KG	2	33
Austria	Dornbirn	EE Rhomberg	21	33
Austria	Ebensee	Sklona Touristik	1	33
Austria	Koblach	Loacker Touristik GmbH	5	33
Austria	Schwaz	Leo Ledermair GmbH	1	33
Austria	Vienna	ÖBB Postbus GmbH	3	33
Czech Republic	Ostrava	Dopravní podnik Ostrava	20	20
France	Antibes	La Sophipolitaine des transports urbains	8	17
France	Lons-le-Saunier	Tallis	3	17
France	Narbonne	SNT	6	17
Germany	Dresden	DVB	5	11
Germany	Speyer	FirstGroup Rhein-Neckar	3	11
Germany	Waiblingen	Omnibus-Verkehr Ruoff GmbH	2	11
Germany	Weinstadt	Omnibus Dannenmann GmbH	1	11
Norway	Lillehammer	Veolia Transport Sør	2	11
Norway	Oslo	Norgesbuss	7	11
Norway	Tønsberg	Unibuss	2	11
Poland	Augustów	Necko	2	187
Poland	Cieszyn	ZGK	1	187
Poland	Czechowice-Dziedzice	PKM	3	187
Poland	Czerwonak	Transkom Koziegłowy	3	187
Poland	Gniezno	MPK	7	187
Poland	Inowrocław	MPK	4	187
Poland	Jastrzębie-Zdrój	PKM	3	187
Poland	Jelenia Góra	MZK	5	187
Poland	Kalisz	KLA	2	187
Poland	Kielce	ZTM	5	187
Poland	Konin	MZK	4	187
Poland	Legnica	MPK	10	187
Poland	Łowicz	MZK	6	187
Poland	Malbork	MZK	1	187
Poland	Ostrów Wielkopolski	MZK	1	187
Poland	Oświęcim	MZK	5	187
Poland	Piła	MZK	4	187
Poland	Rędziny	GZK	10	187
Poland	Sieradz	MPK	3	187
Poland	Skierniewice	MZK	6	187
Poland	Starogard Gdański	MZK	6	187
Poland	Szczecin	SPA Klonowica	4	187
Poland	Świerklaniec	PKM	4	187
Poland	Warsaw	Agencja Mienia Wojskowego	1	187
Poland	Warsaw	Mobilis	53	187
Poland	Warsaw	MZA Warszawa	16	187
Poland	Warsaw	Welcome Airport Services; Warsaw Chopin Airport	2	187
Poland	Włocławek	MPK	18	187
Poland	Żywiec	MZK	2	187
Switzerland	Bern	Eurobus	1	19
Switzerland	Kreuzlingen	VBRF E. Meier Fahrzeugtechnik AG	7	19
Switzerland	Locarno	FART	8	19
Switzerland	Freienbach	Landolt	3	19
Hungary	Debrecen	Piremon	1	5
Hungary	Budapest	BKV	4	5
Italy	Avellino	CTI-ATI	9	15
Italy	Cagliari	Azienda Regionale Sarda Transporti	4	15
Italy	Canosa di Puglia	Caputo Giuseppe	1	15
Italy	Cortina d'Ampezzo	Servizi Ampezzo	1	15
Slovakia	Bratislava	Dopravný podnik Bratislava	10	10
Amount			324	
For: 1 August 2015
