= TEDOM =

Czech engineering company

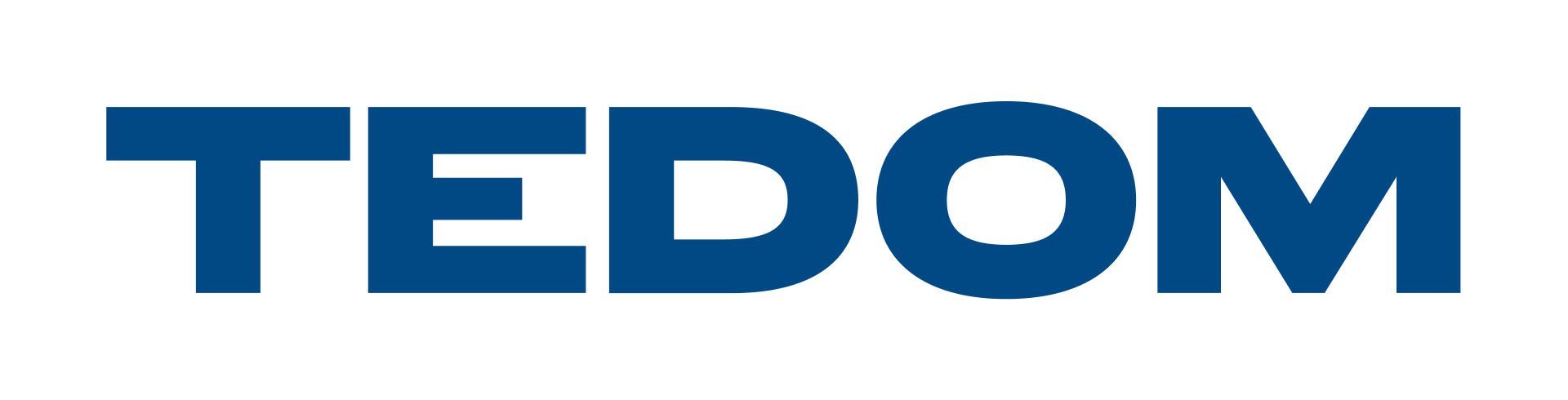
- Company type: Joint-stock company
- Industry: Mechanical Engineering
- Founded: 1991; 35 years ago
- Founder: Josef Jeleček
- Headquarters: Výčapy, Czech Republic
- Area served: Multinational
- Key people: Ladislav Zeman, CEO
- Products: Cogeneration (CHP) units, Engines
- Revenue: 8 billions CZK (2024)
- Operating income: 75,618,000 Czech koruna (2020)
- Net income: 767,564,000 Czech koruna (2020)
- Total assets: 2,697,681,000 Czech koruna (2020)
- Owner: Yanmar (2024–present)
- Number of employees: 1000
- Website: tedom.com

TEDOM a.s is a Czech engineering company based in Třebíč. It was established by Josef Jeleček in 1991. TEDOM is an abbreviation of the Czech words TEplo DOMova (The warmth of home). The primary scope of business of the company is the development and production of CHP (combined heat and power) units with gas combustion engines. The company's product portfolio also includes combustion engines, all of them designed by TEDOM.

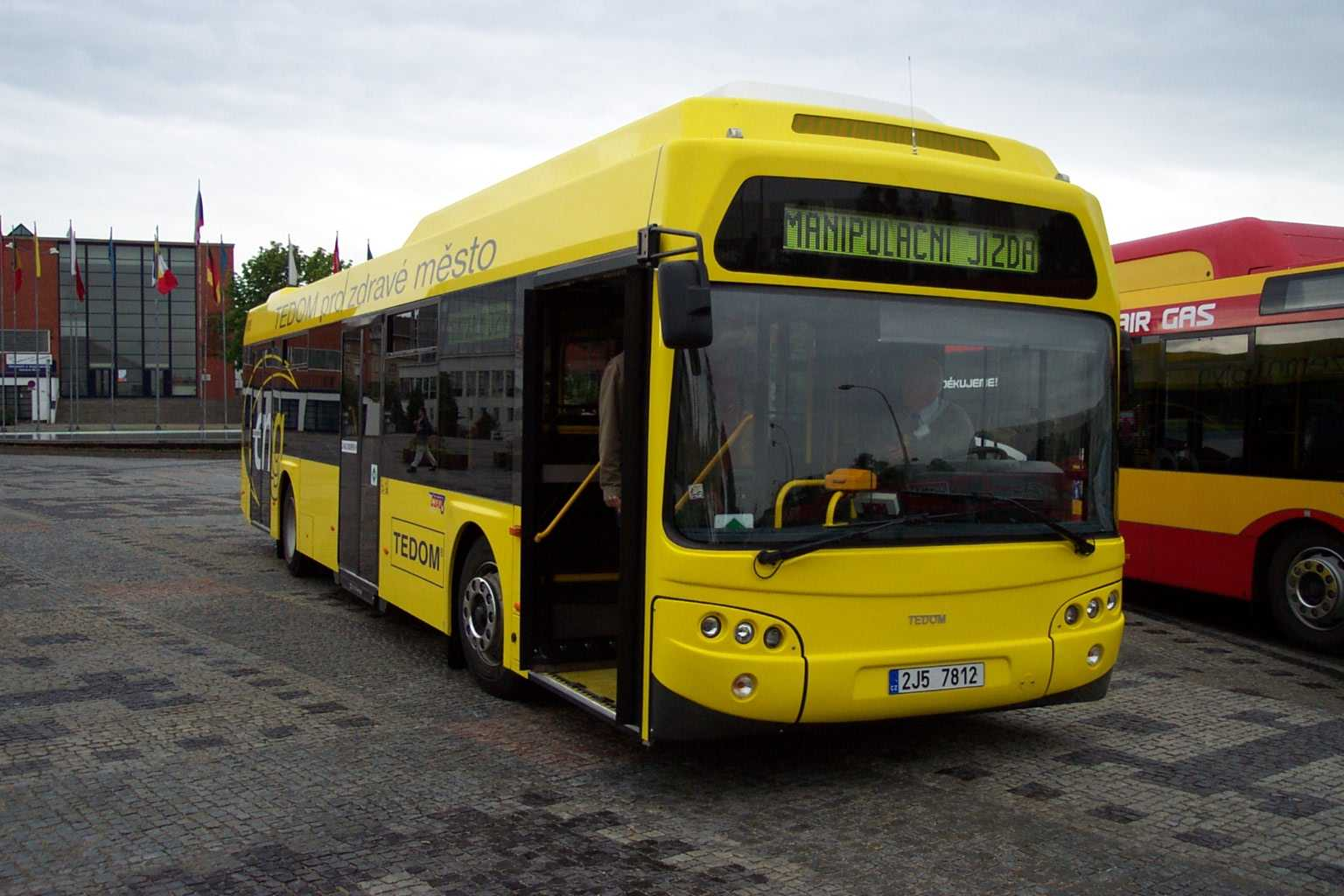

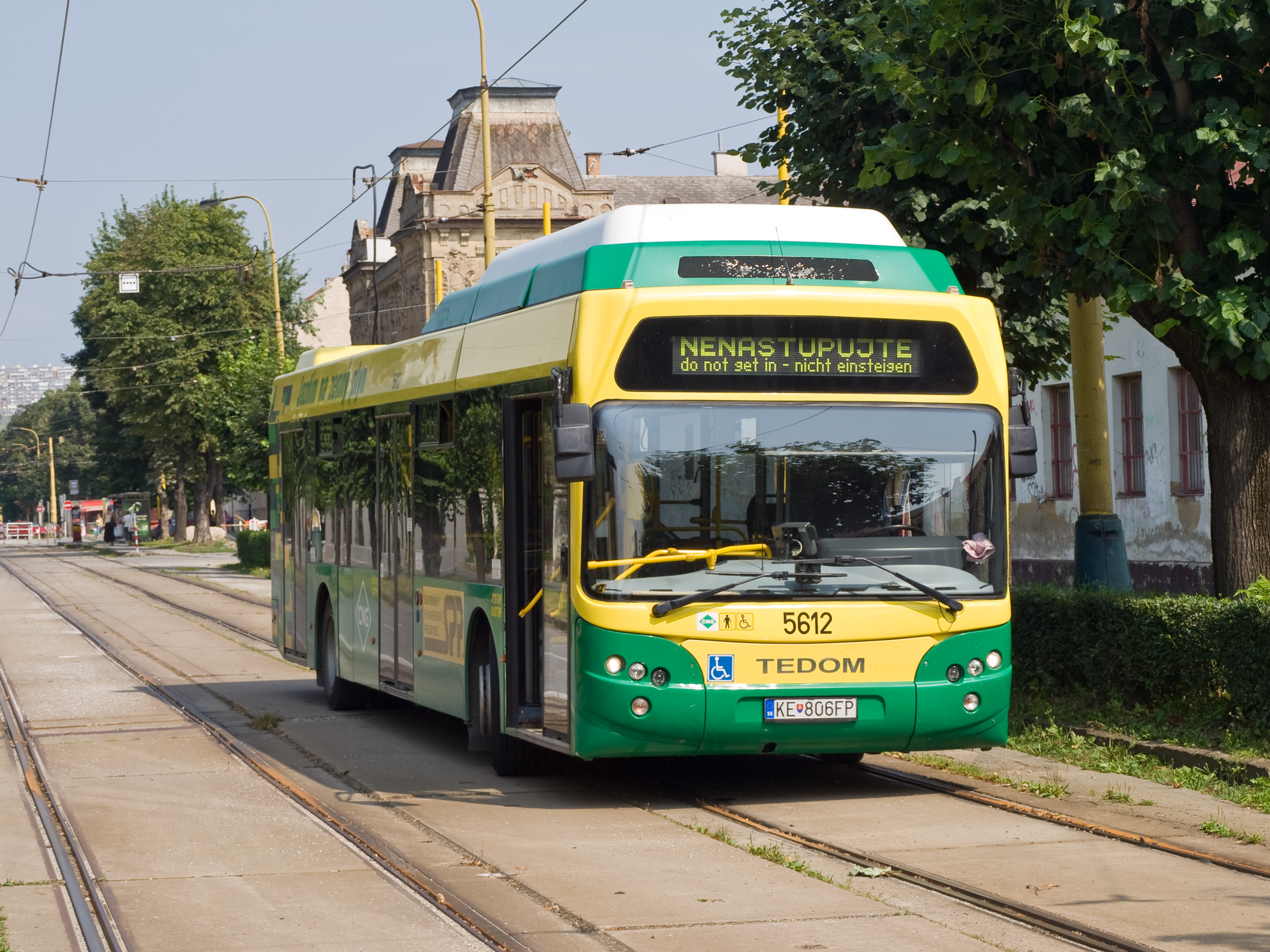

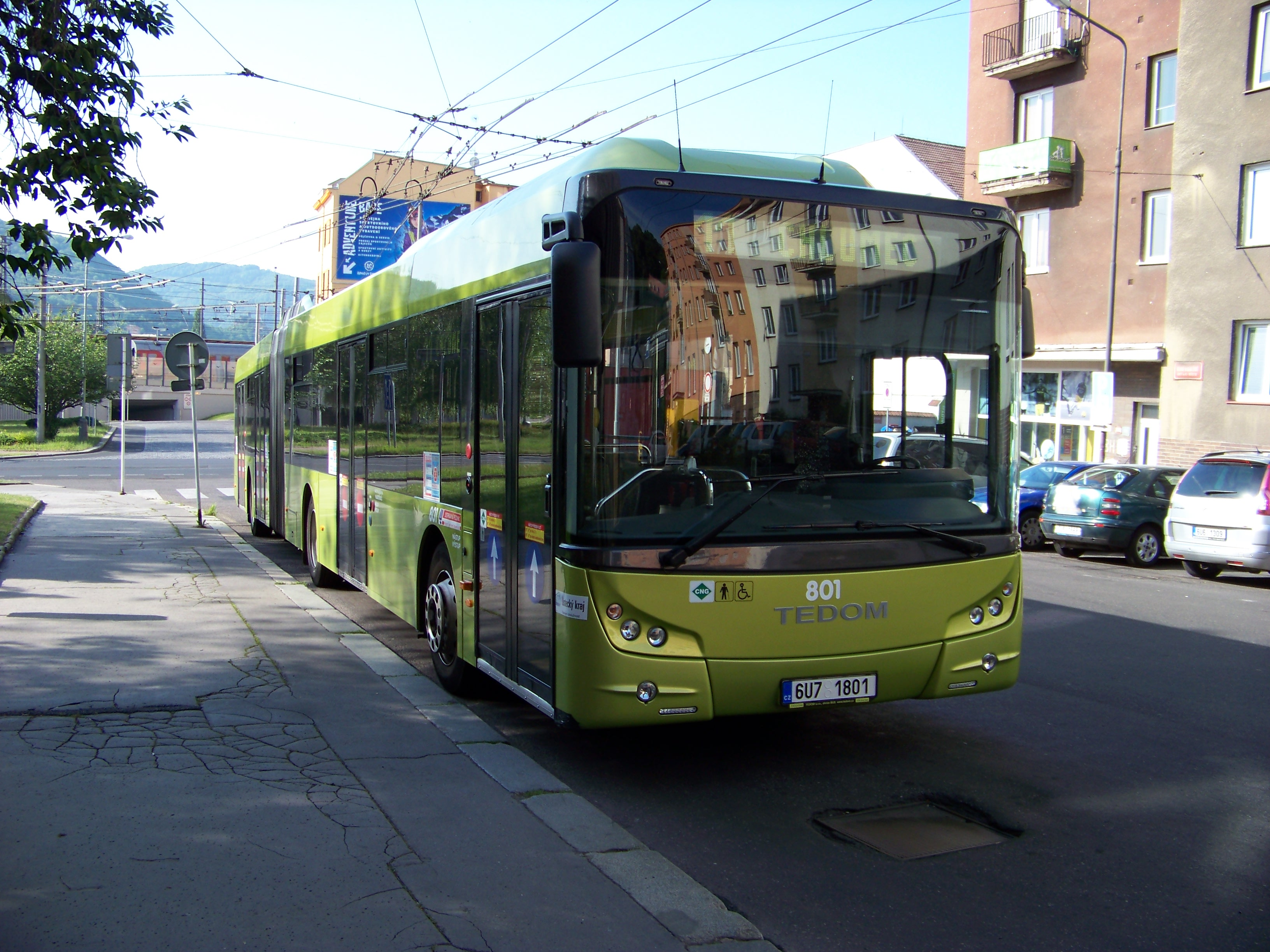

At its inception, TEDOM initially operated as a limited liability company. From 1994, a holding company was gradually established where TEDOM held the leading position. In 2010, the holding company became a joint stock company, and TEDOM a.s. was created. Presently, TEDOM a.s. operates in more than 40 countries worldwide. In 2016, TEDOM acquired the German company SCHNELL Motoren with the aim to lead with TEDOM products in the German market. In 2017 TEDOM established the TEDOM Group – a group of companies that share property with TEDOM. All members of the group deal with either development, production, installation or operation of CHP units.

== History ==
TEDOM was established as a limited liability company in 1991. It was established by Ing. Josef Jeleček. The scope of business for TEDOM s.r.o. from its beginning was the development, production and sales of CHP units with gas-piston combustion engines. The first CHP unit, the TEDOM MT 22 with an output of 22 kW that used the Škoda 781 four-cylinder spark-ignition engine from the Škoda Favorit-model series passenger car, was put into operation this same year.

In 1993, close cooperation was initiated with VKS s.r.o. in Hořovice. This company became the manufacturer of mechanical components for CHP units while TEDOM focused on the production of electrical parts and sales/regional service of CHP units. A new TEDOM MT 130A CHP unit type with an output of 130 kW was developed that year. This CHP unit model employed the model M630-series LIAZ 12-litre compression-ignition 6-cylinder engine (from the model LIAZ 100 truck).

In 1994, TEDOM started a gradual creation of a holding company. The first subsidiary was Třebíčská Tepelná Společnost s.r.o. This subsidiary leased and consequently started operation of the thermal and energy system in the town of Třebíč. The second subsidiary, TEPLO Ivančice s.r.o., responsible for the operation of the thermal system of the town of Ivančice, was established in 1996. The third subsidiary, Jesenická Tepelná Společnost s.r.o., which operates the thermal system in the town of Jesenice, was created in 1997. TEDOM Energo s.r.o. was established in 1999 (originally Příborská Tepelná Společnost s.r.o.). TEDOM Energo s.r.o. started to provide a majority of the activities associated with the production of power and heat within the Czech Republic. In 2000, an additional company, TENERGO Brno a.s. was founded. TENERGO Brno a.s. specialises in operating the thermal and energy systems in Slovakia. In 2003, TEDOM became a member of COGEN Europe (European Association for the Promotion of Cogeneration).

In 2000, individual products were innovated and the new product lines of Premi and CENTO were developed. In 2001, TEDOM oriented its focus on CHP units that operate on biogas. Following this move, a new series of TEDOM CHP units adapted to operate on biogas was introduced in 2002 and the new QUANTO product series was born.

In 2003, TEDOM acquired the JAMOT plant (an engine works plant in Jablonec) in an auction sale. It was a former facility of LIAZ s.r.o. in Jablonec nad Nisou. The engine manufacturing plant became an integral part of TEDOM s.r.o. as a separate motors division. Consequently, the production of low-floor city buses was started in 2004 and the TEDOM city bus prototype was introduced equipped with a TEDOM engine that burned compressed natural gas (CNG). The 1000th CHP unit made under the TEDOM mark was installed in the same year as well.

In 2005, a new product line of MICRO CHP units was introduced.

In 2006, the grand opening of a new TEDOM manufacturing plant for the assembly of low-floor city buses took place in Třebíč. Additionally, TEDOM continued to manufacture trucks and engines to modernise the 810-series railway vehicles into the 814-series motor units.

In 2008, the 2000th CHP unit of the TEDOM trademark was put into operation. Later in the same year, TEDOM Holding was divided into two parts: 25% of the assets passed to TTS Holding, the energy producer, and 75% of the assets remained in TEDOM Holding for the development and production of power engineering technologies. As agreed upon by the partners, TTS Holding was separated to the benefit of the exiting partner, Mr Richard Horký.; the transaction amounted to 60 million CZK. Since that time, TEDOM has focused exclusively on the production of technologies.

In 2010, a merger of the companies took place. The companies joined in the merger were TEDOM s.r.o., TEDOM ENERGO s.ro., TEDOM CHP s.r.o., Jesenická Tepelná Společnost s.r.o., and TEDOM Holding s.r.o., and the newly established joint stock company of TEDOM a.s.

Since 2011, ČEZ Energo s.r.o. operates in the Czech market as the operator of a decentralized power plant. This plant currently comprises almost 130 CHP units with a total output of more than 115 MW. Until 2020, it was jointly operated by ČEZ a.s. and TEDOM a.s. In connection with the entry of Jet Investment a.s. to TEDOM a.s. a 49.9% stake of TEDOM a.s. in ČEZ Energo was acquired by ČEZ ESCO, a.s.

In 2012, the production of city buses was terminated. At the same time, a new product was developed – the POLO 100 gas heat pump that, in the following year, won the Innovation of the Year Award in the "Czech Energy and Ecological Project" competition. It was this same year that TEDOM entered into a contract with the leading Czech power engineering company of ČEZ for the delivery and service of CHP units: TEDOM agreed to deliver more than 100 CHP units with a total electrical output exceeding 100MW within a five-year period.

In 2013, the extensive foreign project in Sydney, was completed, where TEDOM built two trigeneration centres with a total electrical output of 11.8MW. Since 2013, TEDOM has been regularly placed in the competition of the "Czech Top 100" companies.

In 2016, TEDOM celebrated 25 years of operation and more than 3500 manufactured CHP units with the TEDOM trademark. In collaboration with American company Tecogen Inc., a joint venture of TTCogen was established to sell the TEDOM CHP units in US territory. TEDOM share in TTCogen was 50%. The same year, TEDOM also acquired the German company SCHNELL Motoren – one of the leading manufacturers of CHP units intended predominantly for biogas plants. TEDOM took over the company assets and 300 employees of the manufacturing plant in Wangen, including an extensive service network. Also in the same year, TEDOM won an award from the HSBC Bank to become the winner of the HSBC International Business Award competition.

In 2017 TEDOM and other companies, that share property with TEDOM, started to act together within the TEDOM Group. Common goals of all group members are mutual support while producing and operating energy-saving machines for the combined production of heat and power and cooperation on the global market. Currently, the members of the TEDOM Group are: TEDOM a.s. (Czech Republic) TEDOM SCHNELL GmbH (Germany), TEDOM s.r.o. (Slovakia), TEDOM Poland SP.z.o.o. (Poland), OOO TEDOM-RU (Russia), TEDOM USA Inc. (USA).

In 2018 the TTCogen joint venture was terminated. TEDOM continues to operate in the US through its subsidiary TEDOM USA Inc.

In 2019, Jet Investment a.s. through its fund of qualified investors Jet2 acquired 55% stake in TEDOM, a.s. The entire acquisition of the company was completed in 2020 when the Jet2 fund acquired the remaining 45%, which was owned by the Cypriot company Moufleco holdings limited. Jet investment became the sole shareholder in TEDOM a.s. also in affiliated companies. At the same time, a 49.9% stake in ČEZ Energo s.r.o. owned by TEDOM a.s. was sold to ČEZ ESCO, a.s.

In 2020, a new product line of FLEXI cogeneration units was launched.

In 2024, the company was acquired by Yanmar, a Japanese engineering group.

== TEDOM Products ==
=== CHP Units ===
TEDOM specializes in export, production, installation and operation of CHP units. Furthermore, it offers the associated accessories and services.

TEDOM offers CHP units in three product series: MICRO (up to 50 kW), CENTO (up to 220 kW), FLEXI (up to 555 kW) QUANTO (up to 4,5 MW). The products of each individual line are manufactured in two basic configurations: with an operation frequency of 50 Hertz (intended mostly for the European market) or 60 Hertz (intended mostly for the American market). Aside from natural gas, most of the CHP units are also capable of operating on biogas, landfill gas, or mine gas. The company offers CHP units in several versions depending on which environment the unit must operate in: a version without a sound enclosure (for installation into sound-proof areas), with a sound enclosure (for indoor installations), and a container version (for outdoor installations). CHP units are closely related to trigeneration units, but in addition to power and heat, the trigeneration units also produce cold energy. TEDOM included the trigeneration units in its portfolio as well.

The company additionally offers products associated with CHP unit operation (gas treatment plants, exhaust heat exchangers, economisers, and other related equipment). The company also offers the TEDOM Polo 100 gas heat pump.

Aside from its own produced engines, TEDOM equips its CHP units with engines made by Kubota, Liebherr, MAN, MWM and Scania.

In addition, the company also offered a TEDOM Polo 100 gas heat pump until 2020. However, its production was terminated.

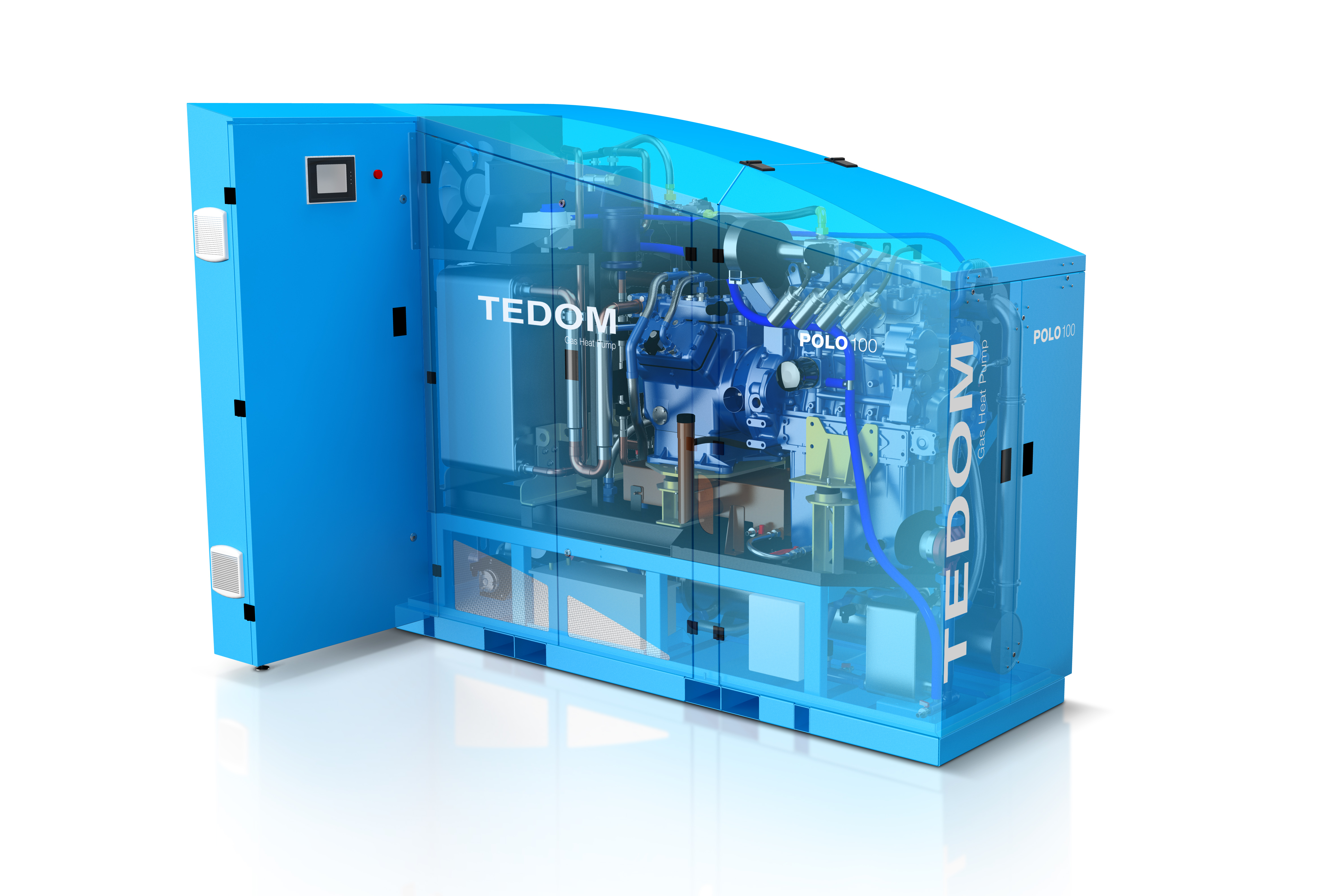
Gas Heat Pump TEDOM POLO 100

=== Road Technique ===
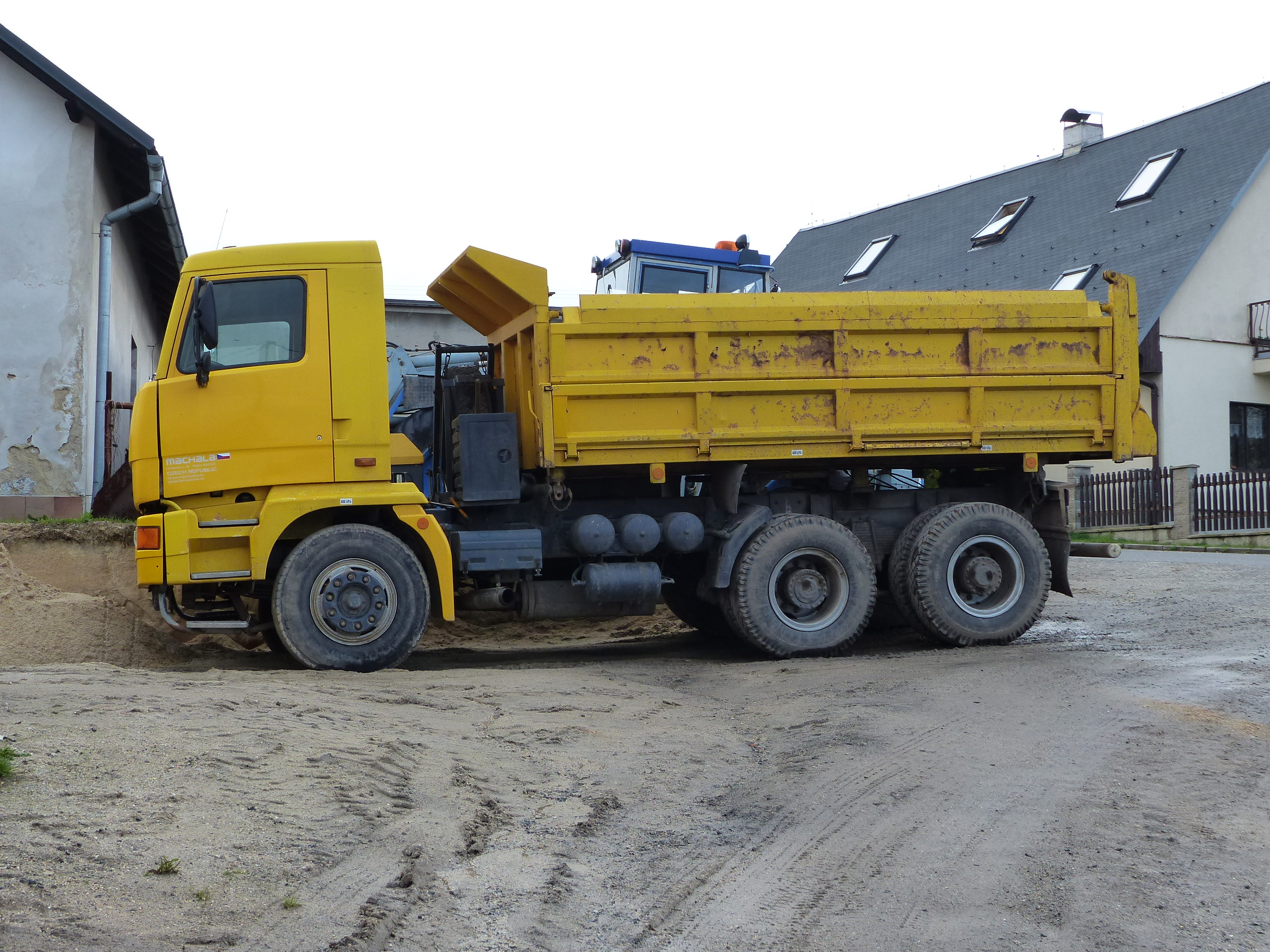
TEDOM FOX Truck

In 2004, TEDOM's Bus Division started production of a low-floor city bus powered by a natural-gas engine. The company obtained the necessary know-how by buying the licence from the Italian manufacturer Mauri. Thus, in 2004 TEDOM became the third bus manufacturer in the Czech Republic after Karosa (Iveco Czech Republic since 2007) and SOR Libchavy. A new manufacturing plant was built in Třebíč in connection with these business activities. However, of the originally planned manufacture of a thousand pieces, the new manufacturing plant was able to produce no more than about 200 buses that were delivered mainly to the Czech Republic, Slovakia, Bulgaria, and Germany. Due to a lack of job orders, TEDOM decided to terminate bus production in January 2012.

In 2006, TEDOM Truck s.r.o. was created as a subsidiary company to TEDOM. This company followed up on the production of LIAZ trucks. Specifically, the LIAZ 300 and LIAZ 400 model. The necessary know-how came associated with the acquisition of the Jablonec engine works plant. The company started to sell trucks under the new TEDOM name. The portfolio offered trucks driven by either a diesel engine (TEDOM-D) or a gas engine (TEDOM-G). However, in total, the company delivered a mere 19 units during its entire existence, only to end up in liquidation as decided in a general meeting in 2009.

== Products ==
=== CHP Units (50 Hz) ===
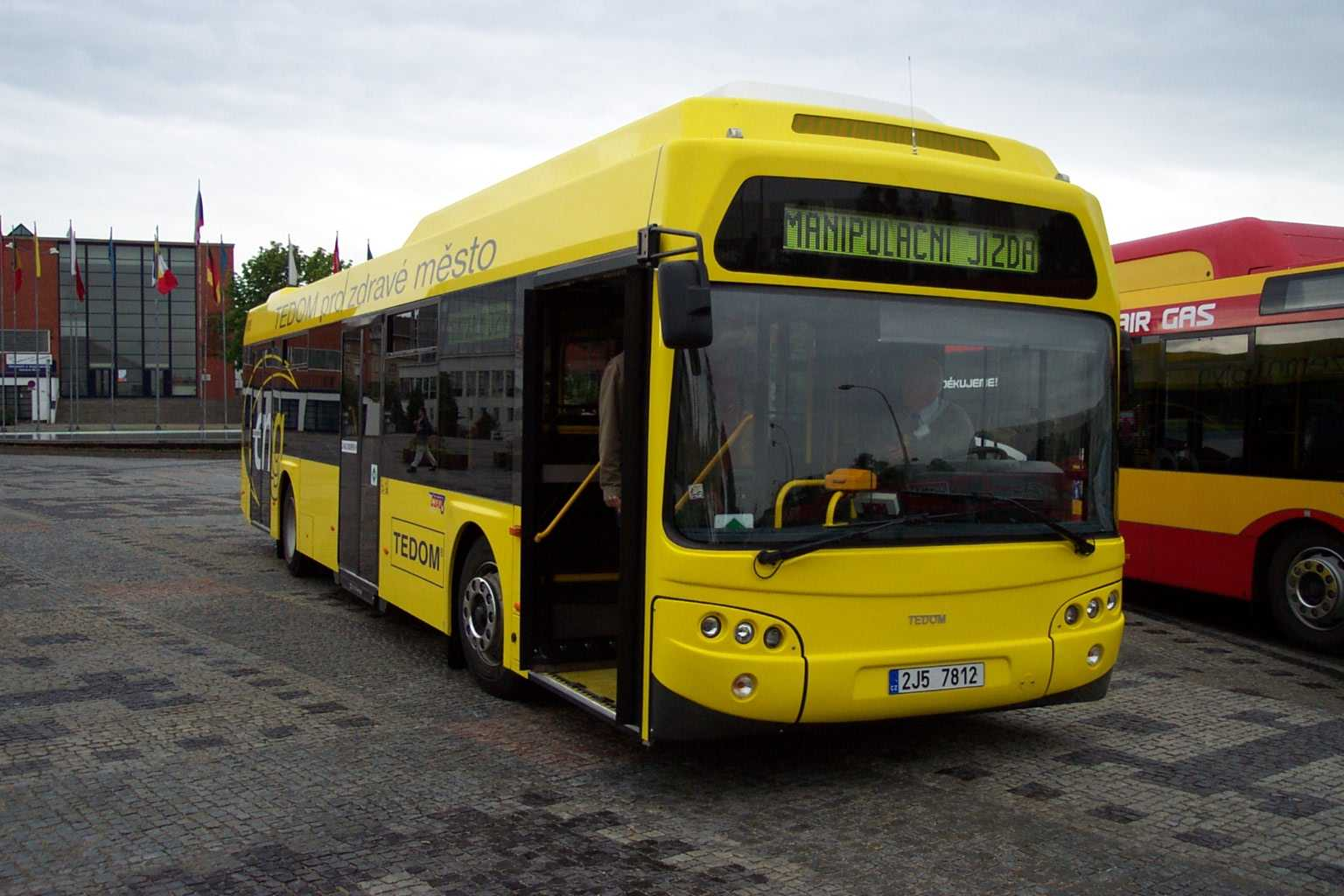
Autobus TEDOM Kronos 123 G

- MICRO series
  - Natural gas and biogas-fueled models
  - Electrical output: from 20 kW to 50 kW
- CENTO series
  - Natural gas and biogas-fueled models
  - Electrical output: from 81 kW to 220 kW
- FLEXI series
  - Natural gas and biogas-fueled models
  - Electrical output: from 260 kW to 555 kW
- QUANTO series
  - Natural gas and biogas-fueled models
  - Electrical output: from 600 kW to 4 500 kW

=== CHP Units (60 Hz) ===
- MICRO series
  - Natural gas and biogas-fueled models
  - Electrical output: from 27 kW to 55 kW
- CENTO series
  - Natural gas and biogas-fueled models
  - Electrical output: from 150 kW to 220 kW
- FLEXI series
  - Natural gas and biogas-fueled models
  - Electrical output:from 285 kW to 555 kW
- QUANTO series
  - Natural gas and biogas-fueled models
  - Electrical output: from 600 kW to 2000 kW

=== Trigeneration Units ===
- CENTO series
  - Natural gas and biogas-fueled models
  - Electrical output: 200 kW
- QUANTO series
  - Natural gas and biogas-fueled models
  - Electrical output: 600 kW to 2000 kW

=== Others ===
- Gas treatment system
- Economisers

== Former Products ==
=== GHP Units ===
- POLO 100 gas heat pump

=== Buses ===
- TEDOM Kronos 122
- TEDOM Kronos 123
- TEDOM C 12
- TEDOM C 18
- TEDOM L 12

=== Trucks ===
- TEDOM Fox

== See also ==
- Energy in the Czech Republic
