= TEDOM C 18 =

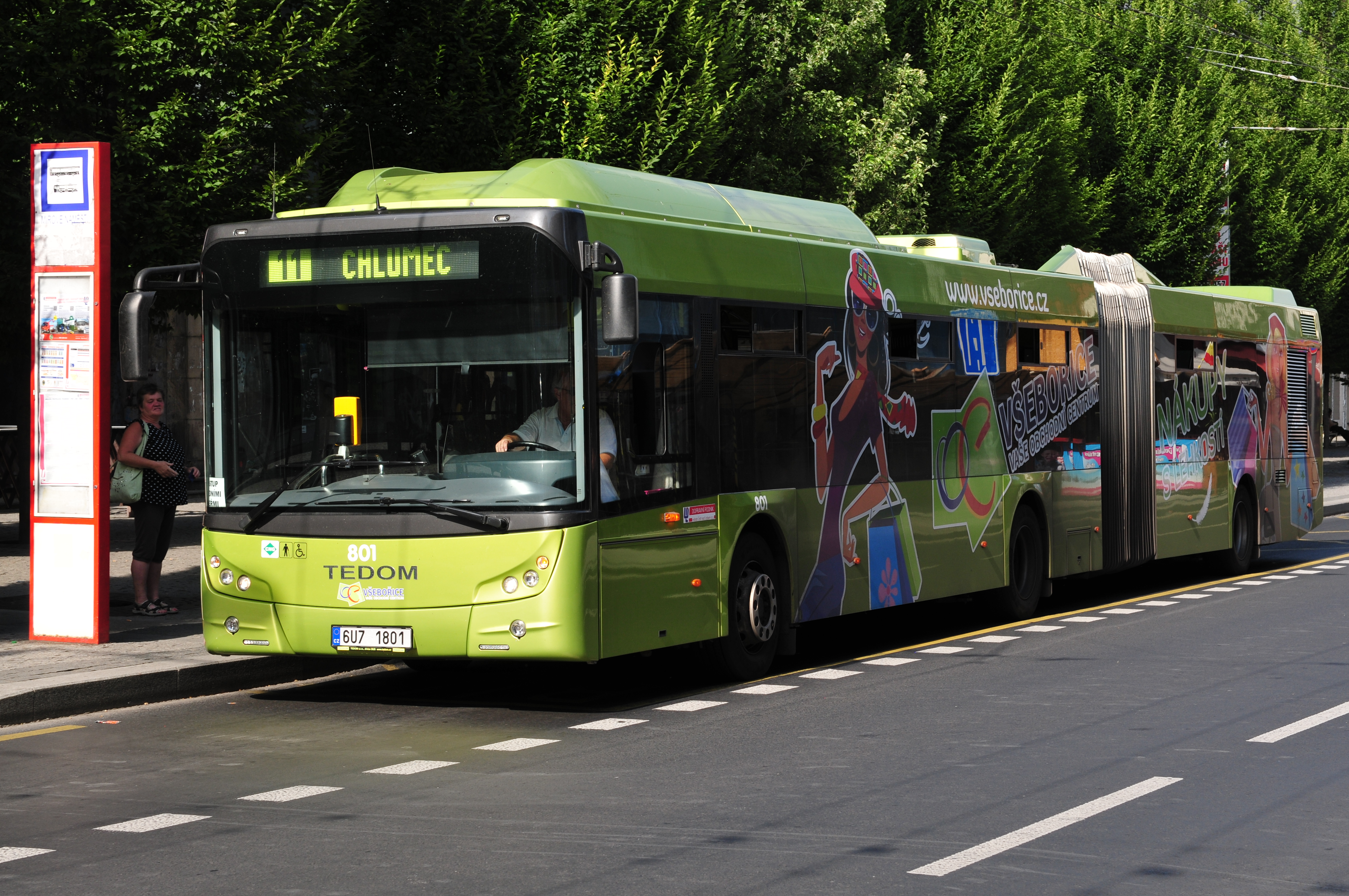

Overview
- Manufacturer: TEDOM
- Production: 2010 (prototype only)

Body and chassis
- Body style: Single-decker articulated bus
- Doors: 4 doors
- Floor type: low-floor
- Related: TEDOM C 12

Powertrain
- Engine: TEDOM CITY CNG
- Power output: 250 kW (335 hp)
- Transmission: Voith 4-speed automatic

Dimensions
- Length: 17,990 mm (708.3 in)
- Width: 2,550 mm (100.4 in)
- Height: 3,190 mm (125.6 in)

TEDOM C 18 is a prototype of a full low-floor single-decker articulated bus produced by the now defunct bus manufacturing division of the company TEDOM from the Czech Republic in 2010.

== Construction features ==
This TEDOM C 18 is a prototype of a full low-floor single-decker articulated bus. Engine and automatic transmission are located in the left rear corner of the bus. Inside the bus are used plastic seats for the seating arrangement. Only the rear C axle is propulsed and it is fully low-floor from the inside.

== Production and operation ==
Only one prototype was made in 2010. It has operated since 2012 in Ústí nad Labem, however, other orders were cancelled as TEDOM closed and folded.
