= TEDOM Kronos 123 =

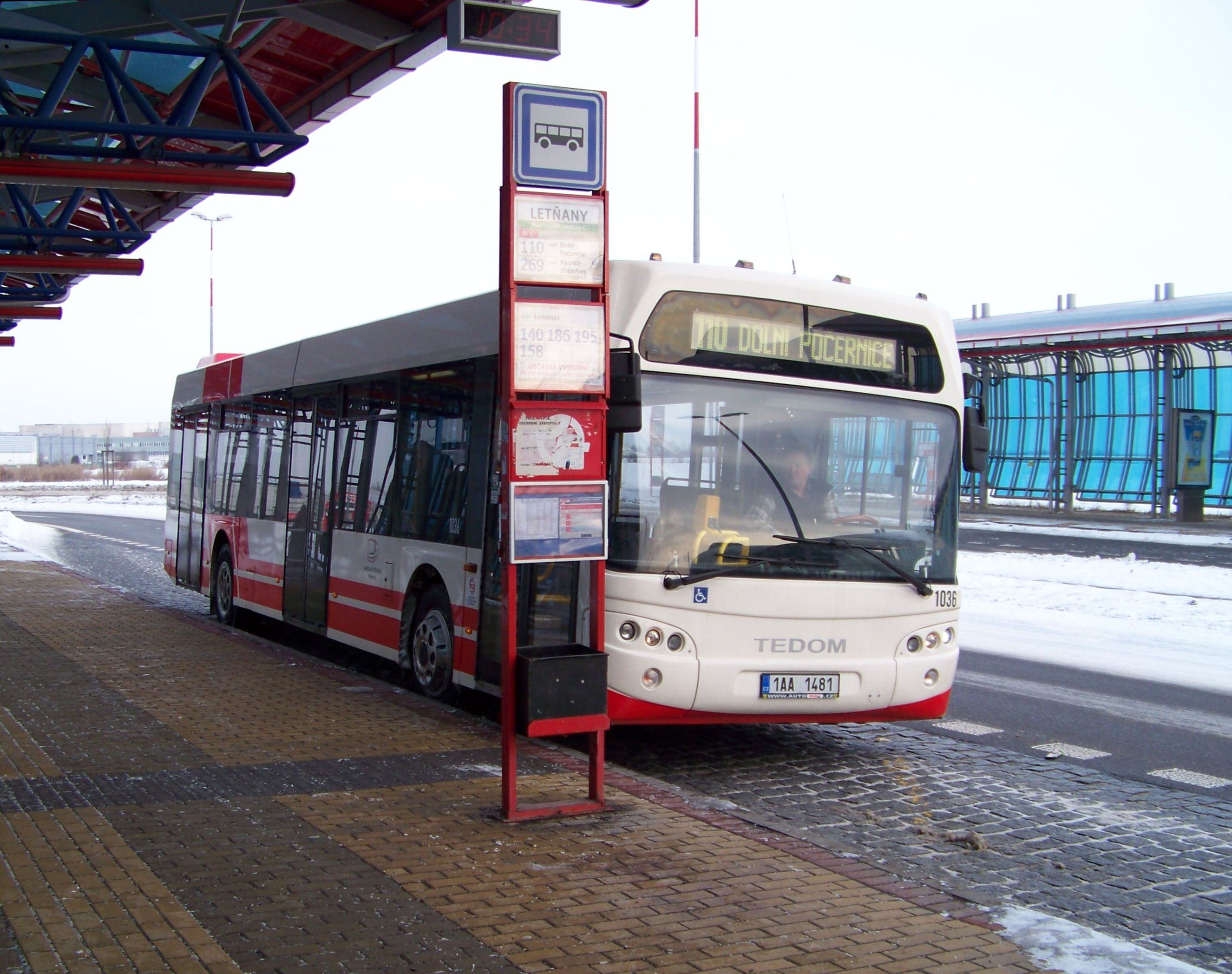
- TEDOM Kronos 123 D in Prague, Czech Republic

Overview
- Manufacturer: TEDOM

Body and chassis
- Doors: 3
- Floor type: low-floor

Powertrain
- Engine: Deutz V6 Diesel engine TEDOM CNG
- Power output: 210 kW (282 hp)
- Transmission: ZF 6-speed automatic Voith 4-speed automatic

Dimensions
- Length: 11,990 mm (472.0 in)
- Width: 2,550 mm (100.4 in)
- Height: 3,354 mm (132.0 in)

TEDOM Kronos 123 is a low-floor urban bus produced from 2004 to 2006 by the now defunct bus manufacturing division of the company TEDOM from the Czech Republic. It was replaced by TEDOM C 12 in 2006.

== Construction features ==
This is a twelve (number 12 in the type designation), the three-door (last 3 digit), urban, low-floor bus, which was offered with a gas or diesel engine. The bus bodywork (manufactured under license of Italian company Mauri) is composed of a truss of the frame, made of thin-walled stainless steel tube. The frame is sheathed with aluminum-vapor sheets. Front and rear panel and roof are made of fiberglass. Motor and automatic transmission are located at the rear of the bus. Gas version Kronos 123 G is placed on the roof of composite cylinders with an aluminum core for compressed natural gas. They have a volume of 960 L, which the car can drive 450 km. In 2006 was supplemented fourth tank so bus can drive 650 km on one filling.

== Production and operation ==
The Prototype of Kronos 123 was made in 2004, and the same year was introduced on Brno fair Autotec (it was a gas version). During the year 2005 went out of the factory gates six of these buses, including one with a diesel engine (designation Kronos 123 D). In the following year produced 10 of 123 Kronos (six diesel-powered). At the turn of 2006 and 2007, the car was redesigned and changed while he was marking on the TEDOM C 12. In 2004 to 2006 and TEDOM made a total of 17 buses Kronos 123 (10 in the gas and 7 in and diesel version).

Company TEDOM presented bus for demonstration sessions in many cities in the Czech Republic. The prototype, along with one other gas and one diesel Kronos 123 remained with the manufacturer, which uses it for demonstration and tests. Six KRONOS 123 G are in operation at Transport Company of Liberec and Jablonec nad Nisou, two other gas runs in the Polish city of Mielec local transport company MKS Mielec. Diesel cars came to Slovakia bought two company SAD Prešov and four SAD Lučenec.
