= L12 =

L12 may refer to:

== Ships and boats ==
- HMS L12, a submarine of the Royal Navy
- HMS Albrighton (L12), a destroyer of the Royal Navy
- HMS Ocean (L12), a helicopter carrier of the Royal Navy
- HMS Sandwich (L12), a sloop of the Royal Navy
- Soviet submarine L-12, a Leninets-class submarine

== Other uses ==
- Lectionary 12, a 12th-century, Greek manuscript of the New Testament
- Liberty L-12, an American aircraft engine
- Lockheed L-12 Electra Junior, an American passenger aircraft
- LSWR L12 class, a class of steam locomotives
- TEDOM L 12, a Czech bus
- L-12, an L-class blimp of the United States Navy
