= Solaris Alpino =

Small Polish city bus manufactured by Solaris

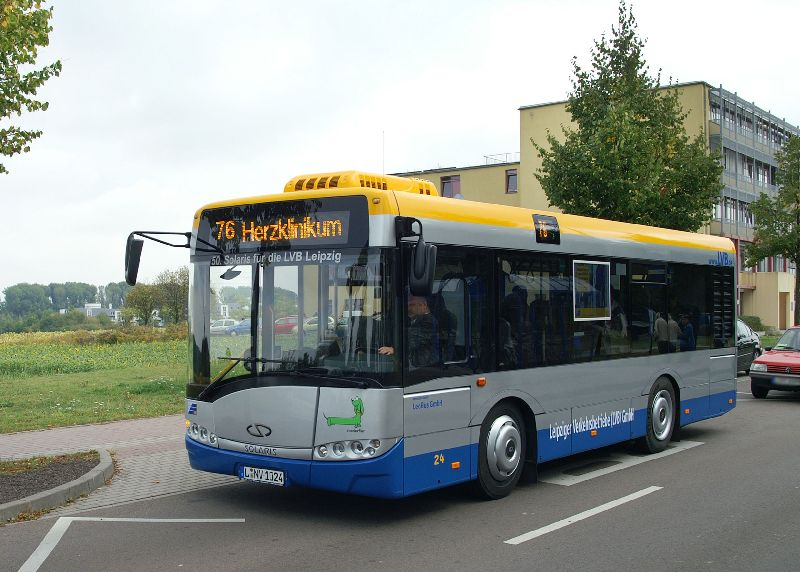

Overview
- Manufacturer: Solaris Bus & Coach
- Production: 2007-2018
- Assembly: Bolechowo, Poland

Body and chassis
- Class: Single-deck city-bus
- Doors: 2
- Floor type: Low-floor (Alpino); Low-entry (Alpino 8.9 LE)

Powertrain
- Engine: 1) Cummins ISBe4 250B Euro 4; 2) Cummins ISB6.7E5 250B Euro 5; 3) Cummins ISB6.7E5 285B Euro 5
- Capacity: 46-60
- Power output: 1) 183 kW (250 hp); 2) 180,5 kW (245 hp); 3) 209 kW (284 hp)
- Transmission: Voith DIWA 854.5 (automatic); ZF 6HP-504 (automatic); ZF 6AP1200B (automatic)

Dimensions
- Length: 8600 mm to 8900 mm
- Width: 2400 mm
- Height: 2850 mm 3035 mm (with air conditioning)
- Curb weight: 15000 kg to 16000 kg

Chronology
- Predecessor: Neoplan N4009; Solaris Urbino 9

Solaris Alpino (also called as Solaris Alpino 8.6 or Solaris Urbino 8.6) is a low-floor bus built as part of the Solaris Urbino series, developed for city transportation, manufactured from 2007 by Solaris Bus & Coach from Bolechowo near Poznań in Poland. In 2008 the longer, low-entry variation of the bus Solaris Alpino 8.9 LE came into production.

== History ==
The bus model is part of the Solaris Urbino series. The bus prototype debuted in the Transexpo Show in Kielce in September 2006. Production began in the spring of 2007, the producers concentrated bus production for Alpine countries, Switzerland and Austria, and for large cities where there are sharp bends and narrow roads.

The prototype was fitted with a Cummins ISBe4 250B engine, with the power of 250 HP and with an automatic transmission Voith Diwa 854.5, the bus can also be fitted with a ZF transmission. The engine complies with the normal standard of Euro 4, by the use of special filters the engine can be upgraded to Euro 5.

The Solaris Alpino is fitted with an engine which complies with the exhaust emissions standard Euro 4. The bus can also be produced with an engine Euro 5 or EEV. The bus can also have an engine fitted which is powered by CNG.

In July 2008 the Solaris Bus & Coach company signed the largest order yet in its history with the Athens company ETHEL (OSY as of July 2011) for the delivery of 320 buses, including 220 Solaris Alpino with engines of Euro 4 standard. The delivery had been made by the first half of 2009.

=== Alpino 8.9 LE ===
The Solaris Alpino 8.9 LE was put into production since the spring of 2008. The first customer, who contributed to the creation of the model, placed an order for three types of the low-entry bus, to a company in Austria. The first information about it appeared during the AUTOTEC Trade Fair in Brno in June 2008, after the delivery of the buses to Austria. Officially debuted during the IAA Nutzfahrzeuge Trade Fair in 2008 in Hannover, which was held from September 25 - October 2, 2008, while in Poland it was shown at the Transexpo Trade Fair in Kielce in October 2008.

The Solaris Alpino 8.9 LE is extended by more than 30 cm from the low-floor variant Solaris Alpino. It has a longer wheelbase and longer rear overhang, which resulted in an increase in weight. Just like the base model it is structurally related to the third generation Solaris Urbino buses. It is equipped with Cummins ISBe4 250B engine (with a capacity of 6.7 dm^{3} and 250 HP in power) centrally mounted at the back and a Voith DIWA 854.5 automatic gearbox. Optionally the bus can be mounted with a 6-speed automatic ZF 6HP-504 gearbox. This engine meets the standard Euro IV using SCR technology, which requires AdBlue. The front suspension can be installed independently or alternatively with the IFS Voith ZF RL 75 EC. At the rear, it has a standard RS ArvinMeritor axle 24 on double tires. The width was reduced by 15 cm when compared with the Solaris Urbino series, and the desire to preserve adequate headroom in the rear of the bus without unduly increasing the height of the whole bus resulted in the need for the rear tires to have a reduced size. To ensure a broad aisle, on the one side of the bus instead of double seats there are 1 + 1/2 type seats on the rear axle. The cab is fitted as standard with a dashboard designed by Solaris, there is an optional dashboard by Siemens VDO or Multibus Actia.

Initially, the Solaris Alpino 8.9 LE had the Euro 4 engine as standard. At present, the ISBe5 Cummins engine or Cummins ISB6.7E5 250B or ISB6.7E5 285B can be used which meets Euro V (which is the same type, but with an additional filter) or EEV. The bus can also be fitted a CNG-powered engine. To reduce the rear axle load fuel tank with a capacity of 165 dm^{3} was placed behind the front door, and the AdBlue tank with a capacity of 40 dm^{3} was placed between the front wheel arches and the middle door. By using these solutions such as the central lubrication system and the self-diagnostic KFBS1 Kogel and the maintenance-free bearings in the drive and steering, this has reduced servicing time and cost. In 2011, the company debuted the first prototype Solaris Urbino electric LE 8.9 electric bus, which was created by a significant redesign of the Solaris Alpino 8.9 LE.

== Gallery ==
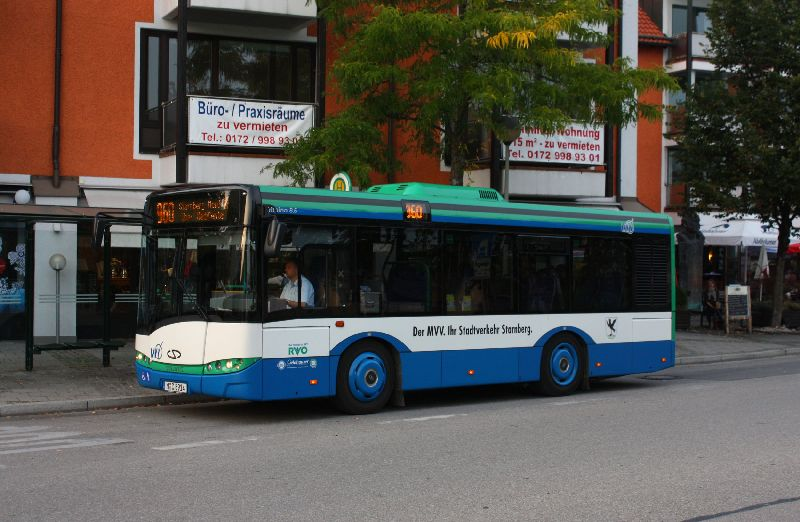
Solaris Alpino 8.6

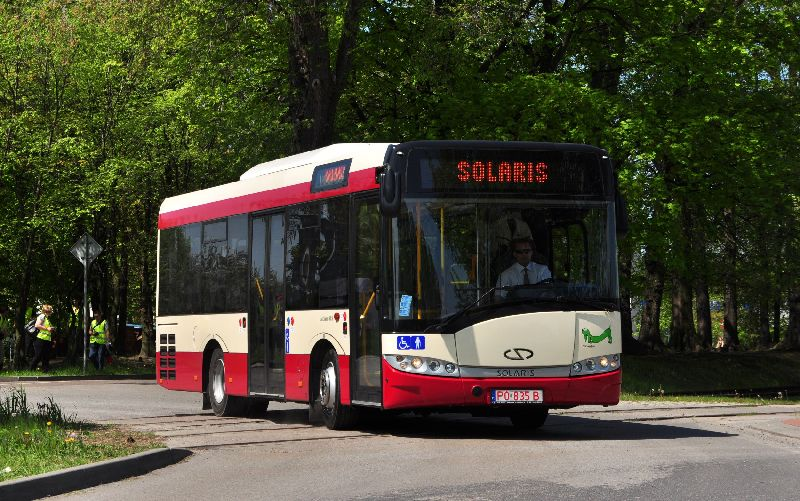
Solaris Alpino 8.9 LE

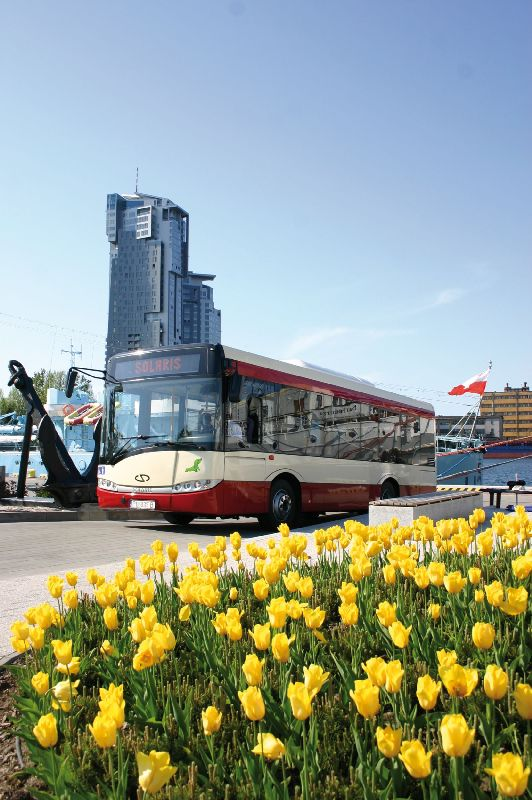
Solaris Alpino 8.9 LE
