= TEDOM L 12 =

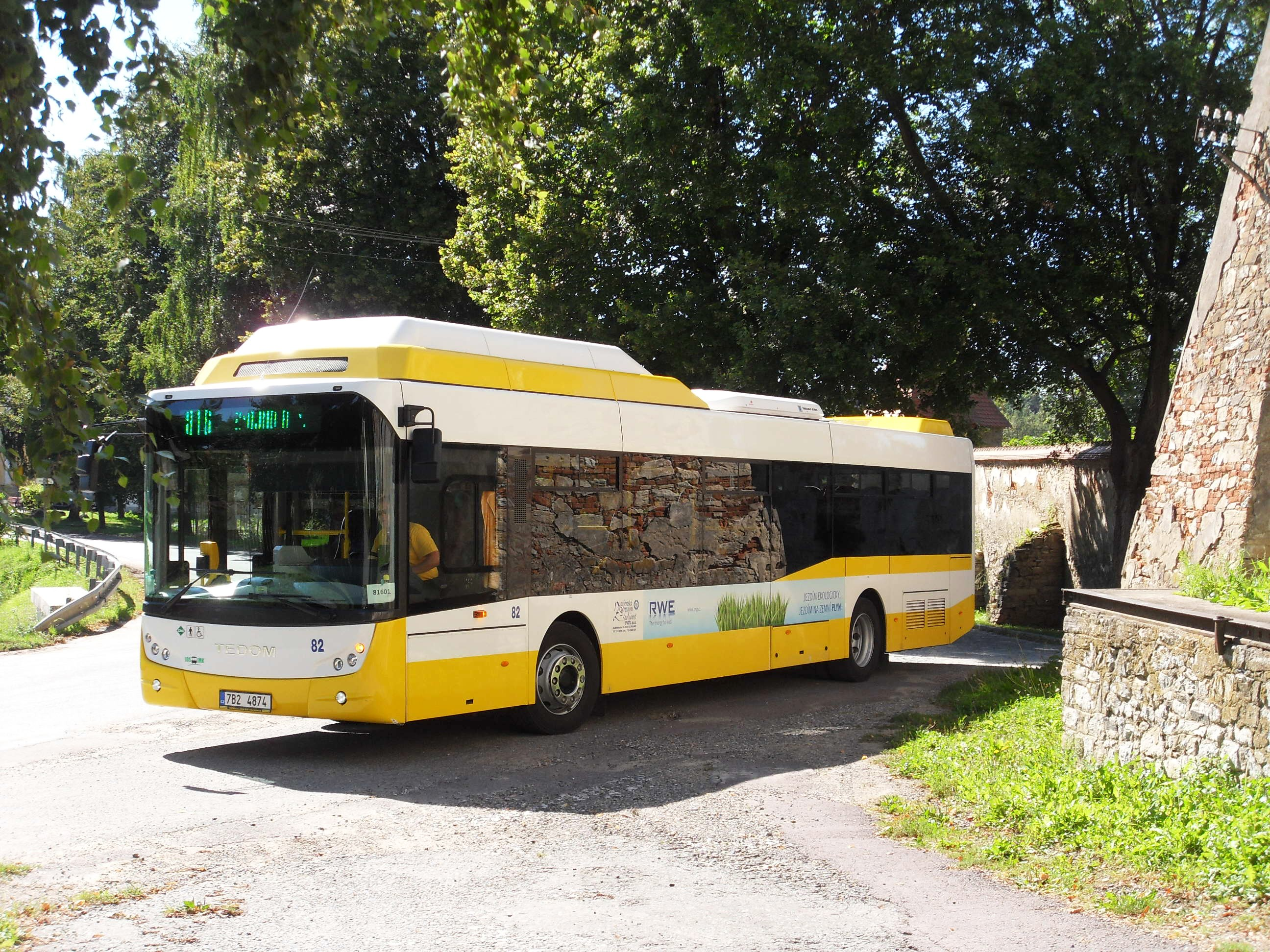

Overview
- Manufacturer: TEDOM

Body and chassis
- Doors: 2
- Floor type: Low entry

Powertrain
- Engine: TEDOM CNG
- Power output: 210 kW (282 hp)
- Transmission: ZF 6-speed automatic Voith 4-speed automatic

Dimensions
- Length: 12,030 mm (473.6 in)
- Width: 2,550 mm (100.4 in)
- Height: 3,354 mm (132.0 in)

TEDOM L 12 is a low-entry intercity bus produced from 2006 to 2012 by the now defunct bus manufacturing division of the company TEDOM from the Czech Republic. The company ceased bus production in 2012.

== Construction features ==
Structurally the TEDOM L 12 derived from fully low-floor urban model C 12. It coincides front, low-floor portion (340 mm above the ground) bus after the second door, located approximately in the middle of the vehicle length. The rear of the bus is accessible by two stairs. TEDOM L 12 is a two-axle bus with monocoque body. Frame chassis is welded thin-walled hollow sections of stainless steel. The cladding is formed from aluminum-voltage plates, front of the bus and roof are made of fiberglass. The interior is insulated by mats with aluminum foil. Toughened glass windows are glued to the body. To access and egress serving two double, electro-actuated doors on the right side, while both flows into low-floor space. Motor and transmission are located under the floor in the back, high-floor of the bus. The three gas cylinders (each with a volume of 320 L) for CNG are located on the roof in front of the car. The manufacturer also offered a diesel version with the designation L 12 D, but its production was not planned in the near future.

== Production and operation ==
The first two buses of the type L 12 were produced in 2007. The first one was launched at the Nitra Motor Show in the autumn of the same year and is still owned by the manufacturer. The second prototype was purchased by bus enterprise PSOTA in Znojmo. In 2008 four L12 buses were produced: one bus was again delivered to Znojmo enterprise PSOTA (was exhibited at the Brno Trade Fair Autotec 2008), one to ČSAD Liberec and two to Bulgarian transport company from Burgas M-Bus.

== See also ==
- List of buses
