= List of Voith transmissions =

This list of Voith transmissions details those automotive industry commercial vehicle transmissions made by German Voith AG engineering company.

== Automatic transmissions for trucks, buses, trains and other heavy vehicles ==
These are automatic transmissions which are installed in trucks, buses, and other heavy motor vehicles:

- D200S, D200D, D501, D502, D506 – 2-stage differential torque converter with either a single, or low and high speed gear range(s) and optional hydraulic retarder
- D851 three-speed with integral retarder and torque converter
- D851.2 / D863 / D854.2 / D864 / D864G – three- or four-speed with integral retarder and torque converter
- D823.3 / D851.3 / D854.3 / D863.3 / D864.3 – three- or four-speed with integral retarder and torque converter
- D823.3E / D851.3E / D854.3E / D863.3E / D864.3E – three- or four-speed with integral retarder and torque converter
- D854.5 / D864.5 / D884.5 – four-speed with integral retarder and torque converter
- D824.6 / D854.6 / D864.6 / D884.6 – four-speed with integral retarder and torque converter
- D827.8 / D857.8 / D867.8 / D887.8 / D897.8 – six- or seven-speed with integral retarder, mild hybrid system and torque converter
- T 320 RZ
- T 24 R
- T 320 R
- L 27 ZUB
- S 111, T 211, T 311; two-speed fill-and-drain hydraulic transmission with torque converters and fluid couplings
- T 212, T 312; three-speed fill-and-drain hydraulic transmission with torque converters and fluid couplings

== See also ==
- Voith Turbo-Transmissions
- List of ZF transmissions
