= Solaris Urbino 9 =

Polish small city bus

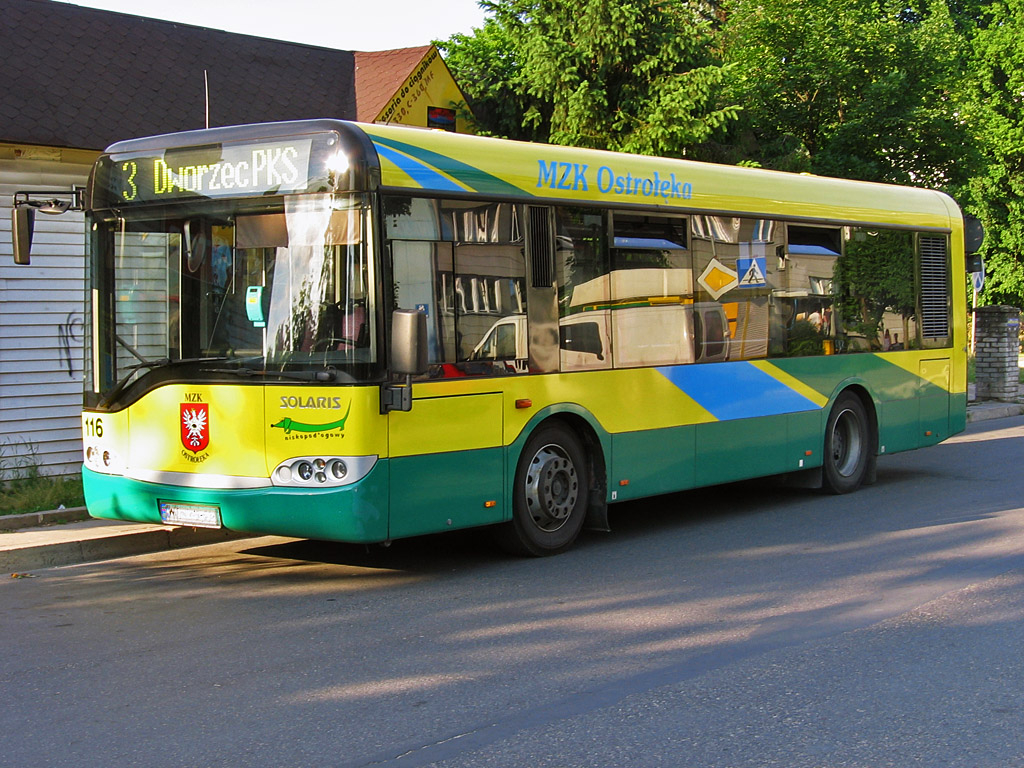
- Solaris Urbino 9 in Ostrołęka

Overview
- Manufacturer: Solaris Bus & Coach
- Production: 2000-2002
- Assembly: Bolechowo, Poland

Body and chassis
- Class: Single-deck city-bus
- Doors: 2
- Floor type: Low floor

Powertrain
- Engine: MAN D0836 LOH 17
- Capacity: 79
- Power output: 162 kW (220 HP)
- Transmission: VOITH D 854.3E

Dimensions
- Length: 9350 mm
- Width: 2550 mm
- Height: 2850 mm
- Curb weight: 14500 kg

Chronology
- Predecessor: Neoplan K4010TD; Neoplan N4009
- Successor: Solaris Alpino; Solaris Urbino 10

Solaris Urbino 9 is a series of buses from the Solaris Urbino series, designed for public transport, produced by the Polish company Neoplan Polska, then Solaris Bus & Coach in Bolechowo near Poznań in Poland. Solaris Urbino 9 is the smallest vehicle from the Solaris Urbino family series.

== History ==
=== Neoplan Polska ===
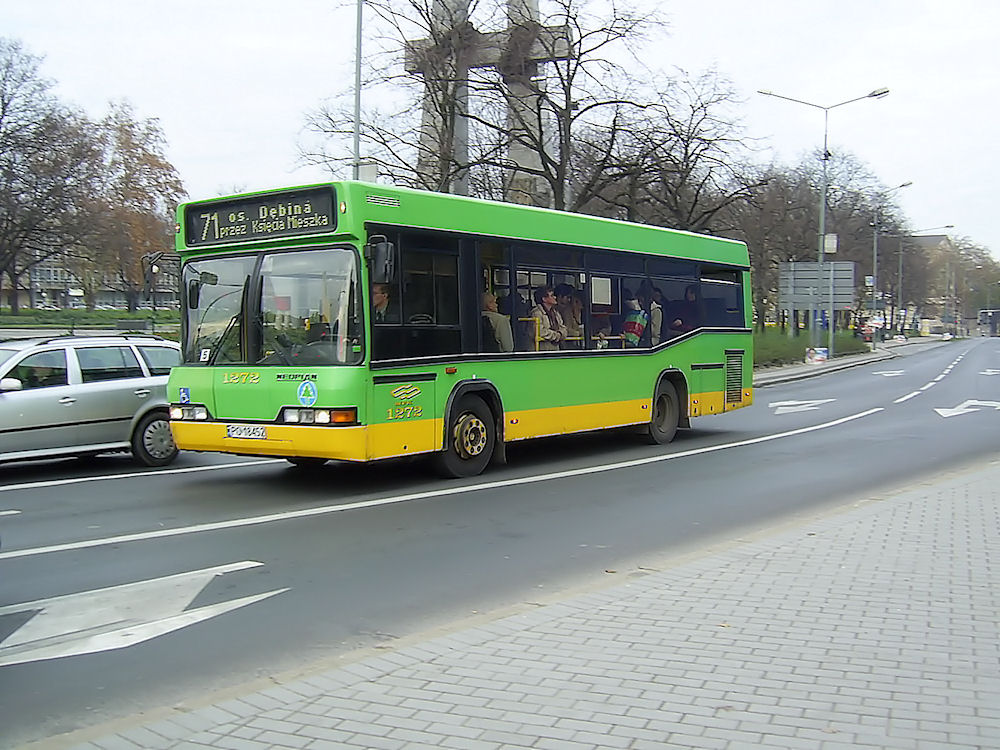
Neoplan N4009

On 2 August 1994, Neoplan Polska company was established in Poland. 5 September of the same year, the first low-floor buses Neoplan N4020 (15 metre long) were ordered by Warsaw. 5 October 1995, the day after signing the contract for the supply of buses to Poznań, it was decided to build a factory in Bolechowo near Poznań.

Between 1996 and 2000 Neoplan Polska built the Neoplan N4000-series buses. In 1999, the company even as Neoplan Polska started to independently produce buses under the brand Solaris, but the offer was not yet available for the short 9 or 10 metre buses. Therefore, the Neoplan K4010TD low-entry midibus with two doors was built with a length of 9.5 metres. However, only 3 were built and all were sold to Świdnica. The Solaris Urbino 9 replaced three of the shortest in the Neoplan N4000-series: N4007, N4009 and N4010.

In 2001 Neoplan was taken over by MAN, but Neoplan Polska became a separate company as Solaris Bus & Coach, which has preserved the company tradition and assets - including models of the buses - of the Polish branch of Neoplan.

=== Solaris Urbino 9 ===
In 2000 Neoplan Poslka completed its Solaris Urbino family with a midibus. They had produced a total of 21 of the 9-metre buses, which were all sold to small Polish towns. The largest quantity of the vehicle was purchased by Ostrołęka, which forms most of the local MZK public transportation bus fleet in the city.

Due to the lack of a third door, this model was not very useful for public transportation services. Another reason for the failure of the model was the high price compared to other vehicles of this size. For this reason, the bus was extended by a metre and had an added back door. The new vehicle, which began production in 2003, was named the Solaris Urbino 10.

In 2006, Solaris Bus & Coach released the Solaris Alpino bus, which is about 75 cm shorter and 15 cm narrower than the Solaris Urbino 9. Due to the narrower body structure the Solaris Alpino has a different seating arrangement.

== Solaris Urbino 9 in Poland ==
Country	City	Operator	Number
Poland	Augustów	Necko	2
Poland	Ostrołęka	MZK	10
Poland	Sochaczew	ZKM	3
Poland	Zduńska Wola	MPK	5
Poland	Kraśnik	MPK	1
Amount			21
