= TEDOM C 12 =

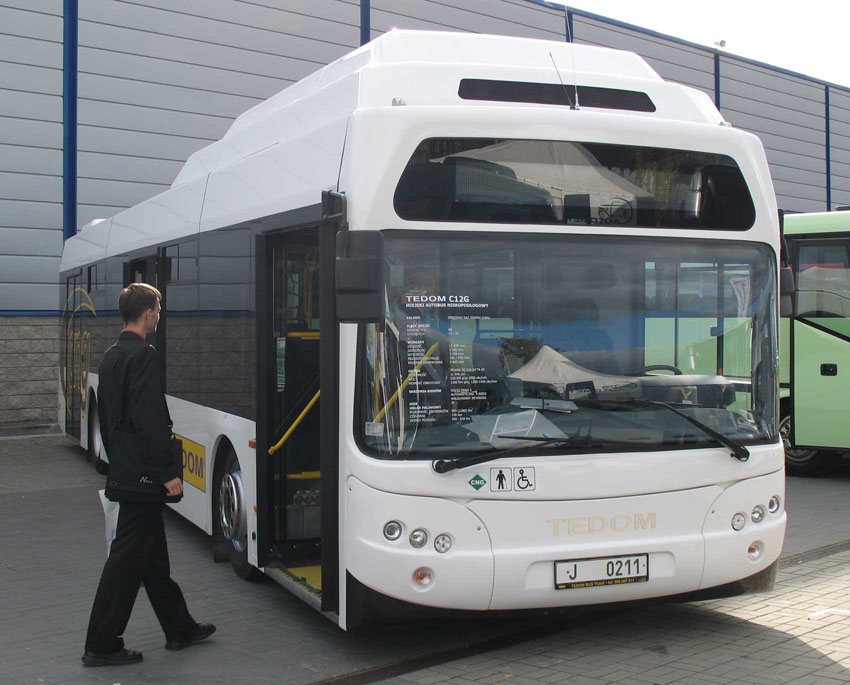

Overview
- Manufacturer: TEDOM

Body and chassis
- Doors: 3
- Floor type: low-floor

Powertrain
- Engine: Deutz V6 Diesel engine TEDOM CNG
- Power output: 210 kW (282 hp)
- Transmission: ZF 6-speed automatic Voith 4-speed automatic

Dimensions
- Length: 12,030 mm (473.6 in)
- Width: 2,550 mm (100.4 in)
- Height: 3,354 mm (132.0 in)

TEDOM C 12 is a low-floor urban bus produced from 2006 to 2012 by the now defunct bus manufacturing division of the company TEDOM from the Czech Republic. The company ceased bus production in 2012.

== Construction features ==
Structurally model C 12 does not differ much from the previous bus TEDOM Kronos 123. It is an urban low-floor bus (floor height 340 mm above the ground). Frame chassis is welded thin-walled hollow sections of stainless steel. The cladding is formed from aluminum sheet faces the vehicle and the roof is made of fiberglass.

The manufacturer collaborated with the bus maker company SOR, giving them special tiles for interior and exterior of the vehicle. The interior is insulated by mats with aluminum foil. Toughened glass windows are glued to the body. Troy double doors on the right-side panel are electro controlled. Engine with automatic transmission are placed vertically in the so-called "Chimney" in the right rear corner of the bus. Rear drive axle may be Voith or ZF and front axle is solid (Voith, ZF or LAF). Composite cylinders for CNG (each with a capacity of 320 liters), which are for the gas versions TEDOM C 12 G placed on the roof of the car, the bus can drive 450 km (3 bottles) or 650 km (4 bottles). Fuel tank with diesel version of the C 12 D has a volume of 250 L.

== Production and operation ==
Model C 12 was created by modifying the structure of the previous type TEDOM Kronos 123 in late 2006 and 2007. During 2007 was produced a total of 23 buses C 12, almost exclusively in the gas version (21 × C 12 G, 2 × C 12 D). 19 gas buses were delivered to Košice, local transport company has become the largest operator of TEDOM buses on the world. One bus in the gas version was delivered to Sofia, Bulgaria. Two diesel buses C 12 D were purchased by Slovak carrier SAD Prešov.

At the Brno AUTOTEC 2008 the model C 12 with a slightly modified front and rear face was introduced .

Production in 2008 included a total of 36 C 12 buses, of which 31 were powered by compressed natural gas and five diesels. Eight cars bought Sofia's public transport company, the company Burgasbus 10 from Burgas, seven Transport Company of Liberec, three cars are leased conveying the company Bratislava (DPB), the remaining gas buses are owned by the manufacturer. Cars with diesel engines purchased SAD Prešov (2 buses) and SAD Lučenec (3 buses)

In 2009, among other buses were manufactured for TRADO MAD Třebíč (3 buses) transport company in Varna (10 buses) and rent for DPB (17 pc).

== See also ==
- List of buses
