= Výčapy =

- Municipality
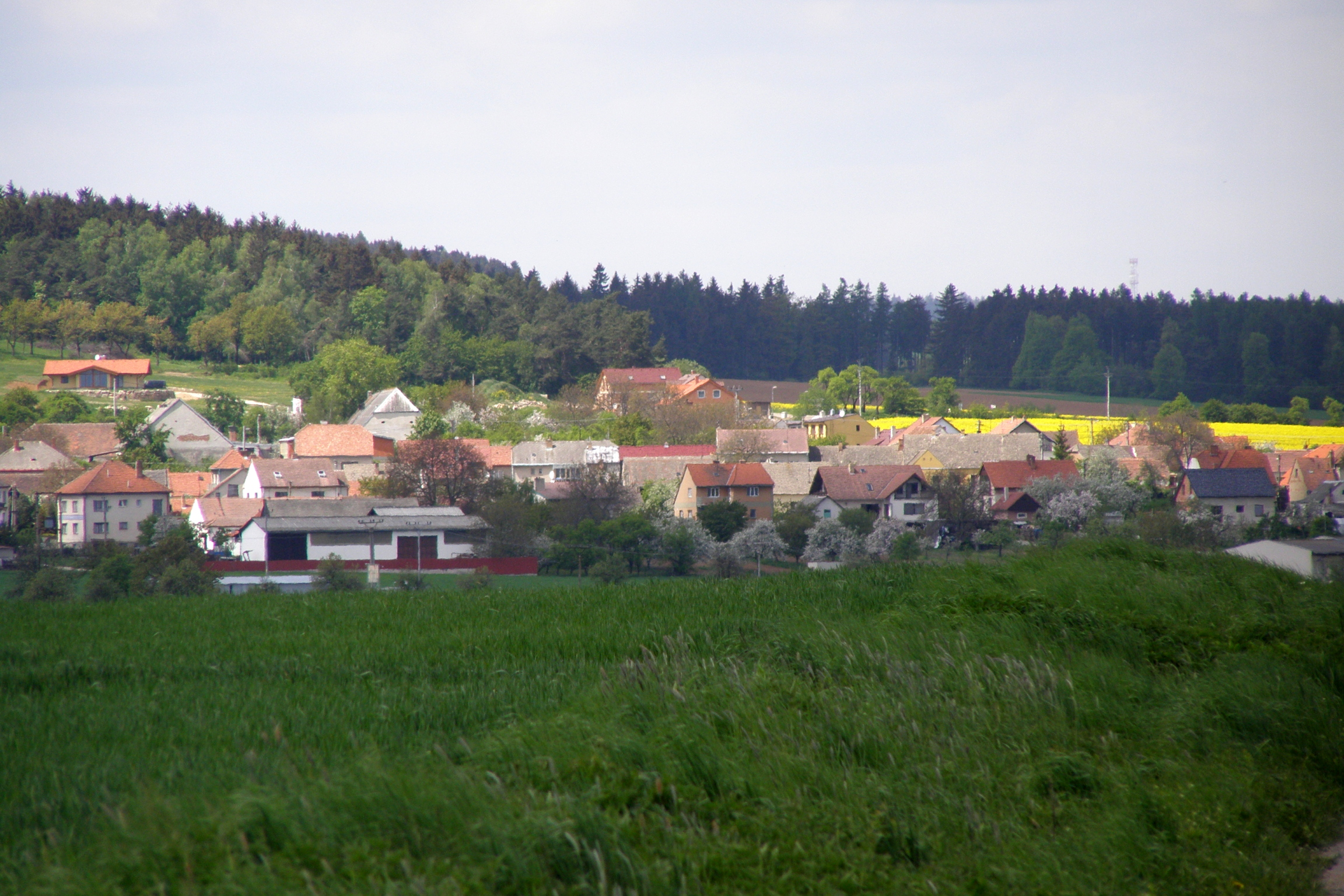
- General view

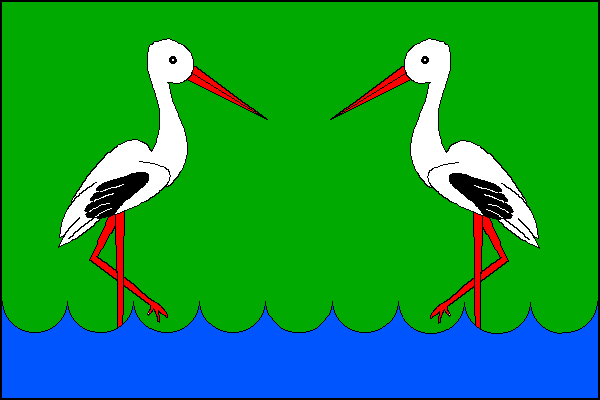
- Flag Coat of arms

- Location in the Czech Republic
- Coordinates: 49°8′37″N 15°52′39″E
- Country: Czech Republic
- Region: Vysočina
- District: Třebíč
- First mentioned: 1104

Area
  - Total: 13.36 km^{2} (5.16 sq mi)
- Elevation: 478 m (1,568 ft)

Population (2026-01-01)
  - Total: 865
  - Density: 64.7/km^{2} (168/sq mi)
- Time zone: UTC+1 (CET)
  - Summer (DST): UTC+2 (CEST)
- Postal code: 674 01
- Website: www.vycapy.cz

Výčapy is a municipality and village in Třebíč District in the Vysočina Region of the Czech Republic. It has about 900 inhabitants.

Výčapy lies approximately 9 kilometres (6 mi) south of Třebíč, 35 km (22 mi) south-east of Jihlava, and 149 km (93 mi) south-east of Prague.

== Administrative division ==
Výčapy consists of two municipal parts (in brackets population according to the 2021 census):

- Výčapy (691)
- Štěpánovice (141)

== Demographics ==
Historical population
Year	Pop.	±%
1869	582	—
1880	655	+12.5%
1890	674	+2.9%
1900	681	+1.0%
1910	690	+1.3%
1921	699	+1.3%
1930	710	+1.6%
1950	658	−7.3%
1961	665	+1.1%
1970	650	−2.3%
1980	703	+8.2%
1991	719	+2.3%
2001	773	+7.5%
2011	824	+6.6%
2021	832	+1.0%
Source: Censuses
