= Voith DIWA =

Type of automatic transmission

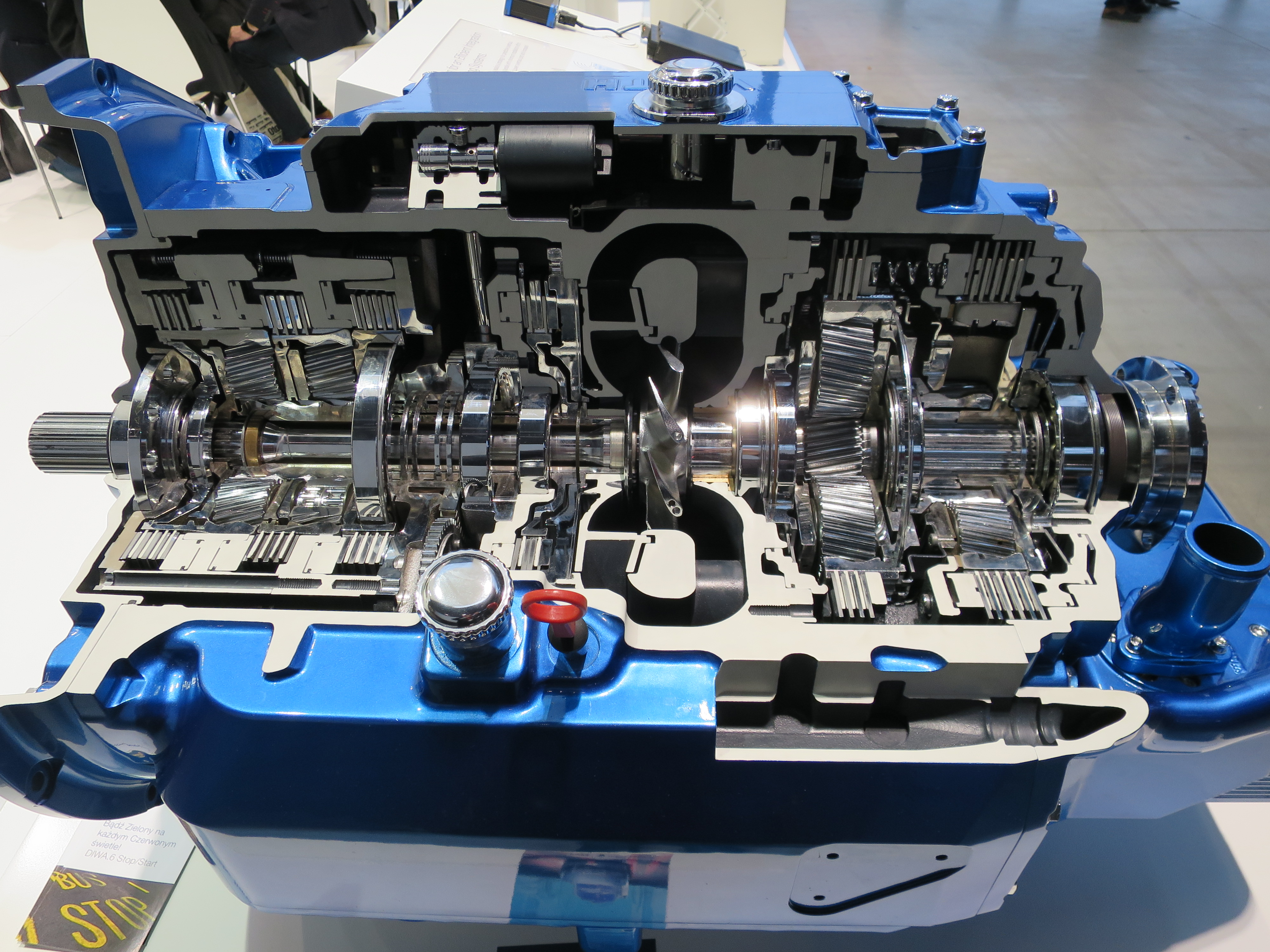
Voith DIWA .6

The Voith DIWA automatic transmission was designed by Voith primarily for city-buses and suburban buses. The transmission utilizes a Differential-Wandler (Converter) or DIWA which replaces two gears which would be used on a conventional transmission. Voith has designed many variations and generations of the Voith DIWA transmission.

== History Evaluation ==
DIWA (D851/D854/D854G) 1976-1990

- Three/four front speed, four-speed G version (for example, D854G on some KMB Metrobus ), which add a set of 1.36:1 reduction gear to the output
- Three-stage throttle sensor (there are two switches on the inside), the throttle depth corresponding to each stage needs to be manually adjusted
- The shifting speed is divided into four stages with the same force (three-stage throttle + kickdown)
- The hydraulic retarder will go out when the vehicle speed is too low, and it will turn a gear at the same time.
- All oil valves are on-off, and the force of biting the clutch is controlled by adjusting the working/o of a gearbox.

DIWA 2 (D851.2/D854.2/D854.2G/D863/D864) 1985-1999

- T0, T1 two types of turbines, R0, R1 two types of rear gear planetary gears
- Automatic neutral selection when stopping
- Individual oil valves can be operated between torque converter pressure and operating pressure, which is higher than the previous generation

DIWA 3 (D823.3/D851.3/D854.3/D863.3/D864.3/D883.3/D884.3) 1995-2005

- Discontinued the G version
- The gearbox computer programme has been reworked
- Uninterrupted throttle sensor (at least seven-stage throttle + kickdown) / signal by the trip computer
- Newly added input speed sensor and back gear planetary gear ring speed sensor, the former is used to check the difference between input and output speed when rotating the gear, while the latter is used to check the back gear planetary gear when the retarder is locked for more precise control.
- The hydraulic retarder will go out when the vehicle speed is too low. After turning back for a gear, gently bite the back gear and slow down.
- The oil circuit is controlled, especially the oil pressure of the torque converter is controlled.
- Most oil valves can sense independently to control the output oil pressure (any 0-100% of the operating pressure), and the clutch force more efficiently. The operating pressure always keep at 100%. Therefore, no need for accumulation delays.

DIWA.3E (D823.3E/D851.3E/D854.3E/D863.3E/D864.3E/D883.3E/D884.3E/D381.4)

- Additional SensoTop fuel saving programme
- D381.4 is D851.3E with a different planetary gear and input flange configuration for the Volvo B10M.

DIWA.5 (D824.5/D854.5/D864.5/D884.5)

- Deleted three-speed version due to high speed fuel wasting

(e.g. the D863 rotates at 2500rpm while D864 rotates at 1700rpm when the bus is at 70 km/h)

- offering with six types of pump wheels: L, F, G, V, X, H

DIWA.6 (D824.6/D854.6/D864.6/D884.6)

- Stop-Start System added
- The operating pressure will be adjusted according to the road situation. It is necessary to increase it at first, which can reduce unnecessary load of oil pumping and save fuel.

DIWA.NXT (D827.7/D827.8/D857.8/D867.8/D887.8/D897.7/D897.8)

- added for additional overdrive gear, retarder and mild hybrid systems
- up to 16% fuel savings compared to the DIWA.6

== Gear ratios ==
D200, D506 (wide-ratio)

1	2	R
1.97	0.95	3.80

D501, D506 (close-ratio)

1	2	R
1.39	0.85	3.80

Differentiator 4

1	2	3	4	R
1.360	1.360	1.000	0.735	3.800

Differentiator 3

1	2	3	4	R
1.429	1.429	1.000	0.700	4.120

== See also ==
- List of Voith transmissions
