= ZF Ecomat =

Automotive transmission

The ZF Ecomat automotive transmission was specifically designed by ZF Friedrichshafen AG primarily for city-buses and motorcoaches. It has several generations – all of the automatic transmission type, and many variants. The latest variants use a lock-up torque converter along with a retarder. Some variants are listed below.

== Gear ratios Ecomat I (1980–1985) ==
1	2	3	4	5	R
2.82	1.84	1.36	1.00	0.80 (optional)	4.84

== Gear ratios Ecomat I/II/IV (1985–2016) ==
1	2	3	4	5	6	R
3.43	2.01	1.42	1.00	0.83 (optional)	0.59 (optional)	4.84

== 1st generation — Ecomat (1980–2002) ==
All generations of the Ecomat series are no longer in production.

- 4HP500 / 5HP500 / 6HP500 — four-, five- or six-speed; maximum input torque of 1,100 N⋅m (811 lbf⋅ft)
- 4HP590 / 5HP590 / 6HP590 — four-, five- or six-speed; maximum input torque of 1,250 N⋅m (922 lbf⋅ft)
- 4HP600 / 5HP600 / 6HP600 — four-, five- or six-speed; maximum input torque of 1,400 N⋅m (1,033 lbf⋅ft)

== 2nd generation — Ecomat 2 (1997–2007) ==
All generations of the Ecomat series are no longer in production.

- 4HP502/C / 5HP502/C / 6HP502/C — four-, five- or six-speed; maximum input torque of 1,100 N⋅m (811 lbf⋅ft)
- 4HP592/C / 5HP592/C / 6HP592/C — four-, five- or six-speed; maximum input torque of 1,250 N⋅m (922 lbf⋅ft)
- 4HP602/C / 5HP602/C / 6HP602/C — four-, five- or six-speed; maximum input torque of 1,600 N⋅m (1,180 lbf⋅ft)

== 3rd generation — Ecomat 4 (2006–2016) ==
All generations of the Ecomat series are no longer in production.

- 5HP504/C – five speed for lighter buses up to 13 ton; maximum input torque of 850 N⋅m (627 lbf⋅ft)
- 5HP504/C / 6HP504/C — five- or six-speed; maximum input torque of 1,100 N⋅m (811 lbf⋅ft)
- 5HP594/C / 6HP594/C — five- or six-speed; maximum input torque of 1,250 N⋅m (922 lbf⋅ft)
- 5HP604/C / 6HP604/C — five- or six-speed; maximum input torque of 1,750 N⋅m (1,291 lbf⋅ft)

== Use in rail vehicles ==
In addition to its use in road vehicles, the Ecomat transmission is also employed in the Class 172 lightweight diesel multiple unit (DMU) trains in service with various operators in Great Britain, in major refurbishments of ČD Class 842 in the Czech Republic, CAF built C4K in Northern Ireland and the ABB Scandia built IC3 (DSB Class MF) DMUs in Denmark.

== See also ==
- List of ZF transmissions
