= Solaris Bus & Coach =

Polish public transport vehicles producer

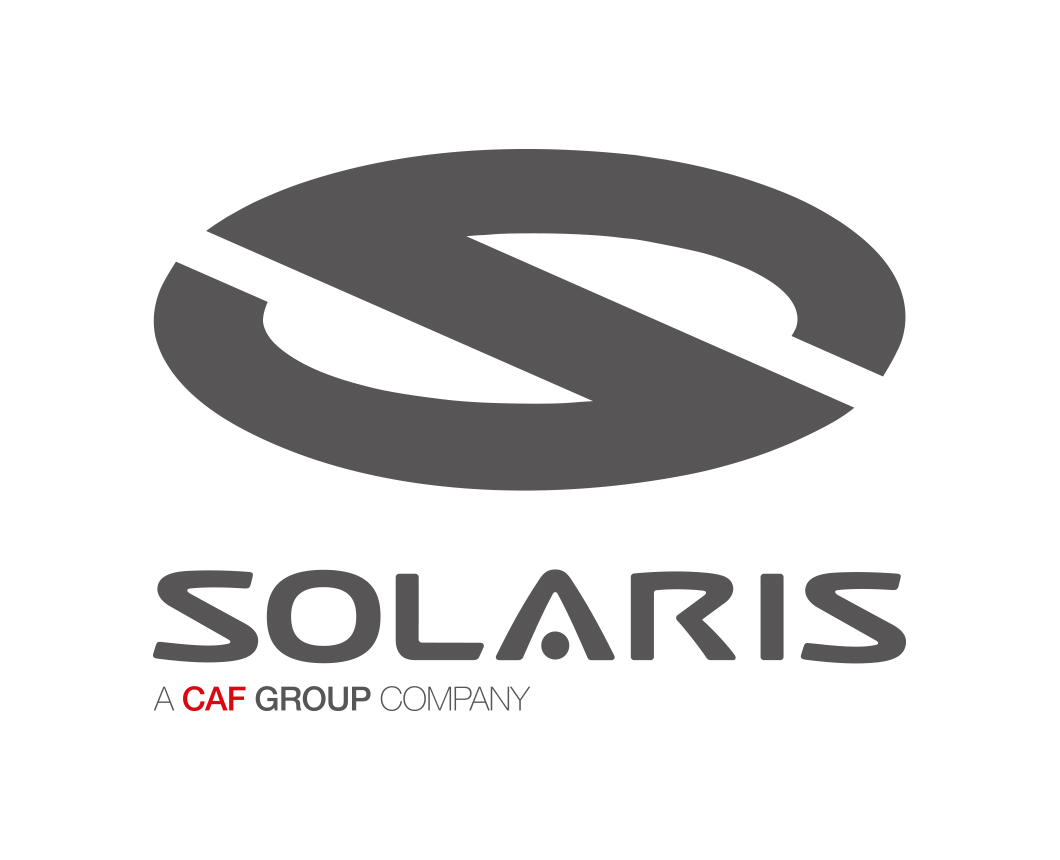
- Industry: Automotive industry
- Founded: 1994
- Founder: Krzysztof Olszewski
- Headquarters: Obornicka 46, 62-005 Bolechowo, Greater Poland Voivodeship, Poland
- Area served: Worldwide
- Key people: Javier Iriarte (President of the Management Board); Javier Ojinaga (Chairman of the supervisory board)
- Products: buses, trams
- Revenue: ▲€1.18 billion (2025)
- Operating income: ▲€74 million (2025)
- Net income: ▲€13.5 million
- Total assets: ▲€126.1 million
- Total equity: ▲€87.6 million
- Number of employees: 2,700
- Parent: CAF
- Website: www.solarisbus.com

Solaris Bus & Coach sp z o.o. is a Polish manufacturer of public transport vehicles (buses, trolleybuses and trams), with its headquarters in Bolechowo-Osiedle near Poznań. It is a subsidiary of Spanish rolling stock manufacturer CAF with a market share for electric buses in Europe of about 18%.

The firm arose from the enterprise Neoplan Polska Sp. z o.o., established in 1994. A production facility was launched in Bolechowo-Osiedle near Poznań in 1996. The first low-floor bus produced in Bolechowo rolled off the assembly line on 22 March 1996 and it is this very date that is understood as the beginning of the company's history. 1999 saw the premiere of the first city bus of the Solaris brand – the Solaris Urbino 12. In 2001 the company was rebranded into Solaris Bus & Coach Sp. z o.o., only to be converted from a limited liability company into a joint-stock company. The company is not publicly listed.

Solaris city buses are available in diverse drive configurations as well as bodywork sizes and types. In 2006, Solaris became the first manufacturer to market, in Europe, the first serially produced hybrid drive bus Solaris Urbino 18 Hybrid. The portfolio of the bus maker covers conventionally fuelled vehicles (diesel) as well as those with an alternative drive (electric, hybrid and CNG buses or trolleybuses). The Solaris Urbino 12 electric was the first Polish, and the first electric bus at that, to win an international title for the year Bus and Coach of the Year 2017. In that year, Solaris had reached a turnover of Euro 444 million. In July 2018, it was announced that Construcciones y Auxiliar de Ferrocarriles (CAF) had acquired Solaris.

== History ==
=== Neoplan Polska ===
In 1994, engineer Krzysztof Olszewski founded the company Neoplan Polska Sp. z o.o., a branch office for the Polish market of German bus brand Neoplan. In 1995, this enterprise won a tender for the delivery of 72 low-floor city buses for Poznań. The tender was made conditional upon locating the bus manufacturing factory in the vicinity of Poznań. As a result, the company launched an assembly plant for buses in Bolechowo-Osiedle. The first bus produced by Neoplan Polska came fresh off the production line on 22 March 1996. Having carried out the order for Poznań, the firm went on to reach the position of Polish market leader in the segment of low-floor city buses. Initially, the Bolechowo plant manufactured licence-based buses of the Neoplan family:

- Neoplan N4009
- Neoplan N4016
- Neoplan N4020
- Neoplan N4021

The buses stood out from other ones thanks to their reliability and the quality of execution, but above all thanks to their innovative design and, which was a novelty back then, its accessibility for elderly and disabled people thanks to the low floor. An element distinguishing the Neoplan buses produced in Poland from those made abroad was the green dachshund logo pasted onto the left-hand corner of the front face. It was supposed to symbolise the low-floor feature of the bus and the simplicity of use. The colour of the dachshund was a reference to the company's environmental commitment in the production of public transport vehicles. The green dachshund has remained the symbol of the company to this day.

In the second half of the 1990s, the company Neoplan Polska expanded its own technical office in charge of research and development. Back then, the company was already using software that allowed it to shorten the time needed to design and build a prototype of a new model. Towards the end of the 1990s Neoplan launched a new generation of city buses. However, Mr Olszewski decided not to launch their production in the Bolechowo plant, as they would not meet with interest in Poland on account of their exorbitant price. Then, in 1998, the Neoplan Polska engineers constructed the first city bus to be produced only in Bolechowo – the Neoplan K4016TD (and its shorter version, the Neoplan K4010TD), for marketing purposes dubbed Olibus. 1999 saw the début of the first city bus of the Solaris Urbino family (see: section City and intercity buses). To begin with Neoplan Polska was tied by its contract with Neoplan, so the company of Mr Olszewski was able to sell buses only in Poland or in countries in central and eastern Europe. In 2001, Neoplan was taken over by German company MAN. That is why on 1 September 2001, the firm Neoplan Polska was turned into a private limited company (pol. spółka z ograniczoną odpowiedzialnością), and its name was changed to Solaris Bus & Coach Sp. z o.o. Krzysztof and Solange Olszewski became the sole owners. From that point on the export of Solaris buses was no longer limited by contracts with Neoplan, and all ties to that company were rendered invalid. On 1 July 2005 the company was transformed into joint-stock company (pol.spółka akcyjna) Solaris Bus & Coach S.A.

Years later his wife Solange Olszewska noted: “My husband and I were looking for a name that would evoke positive connotations in all languages, that would be easy to pronounce and would be related to the future. We were unable to find anything suitable. Then, among hundreds of words, we noticed “solaris” – a simple name, bringing to mind positive associations with sunshine and beginning with the same letter as my first name.

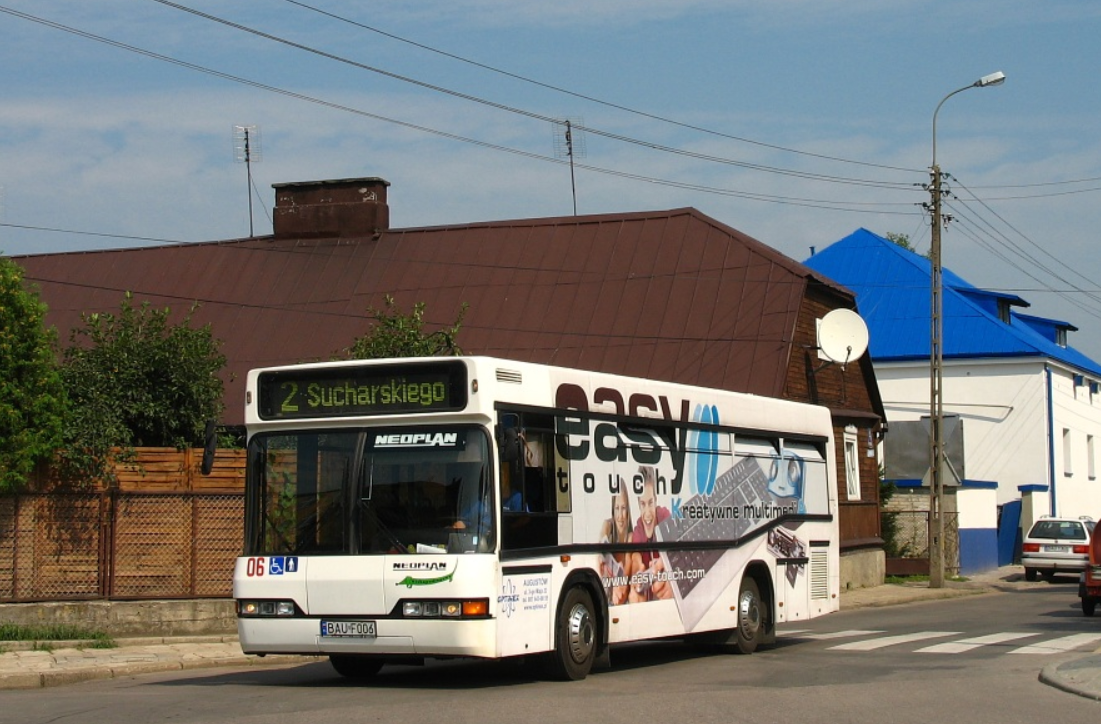
Neoplan N4009

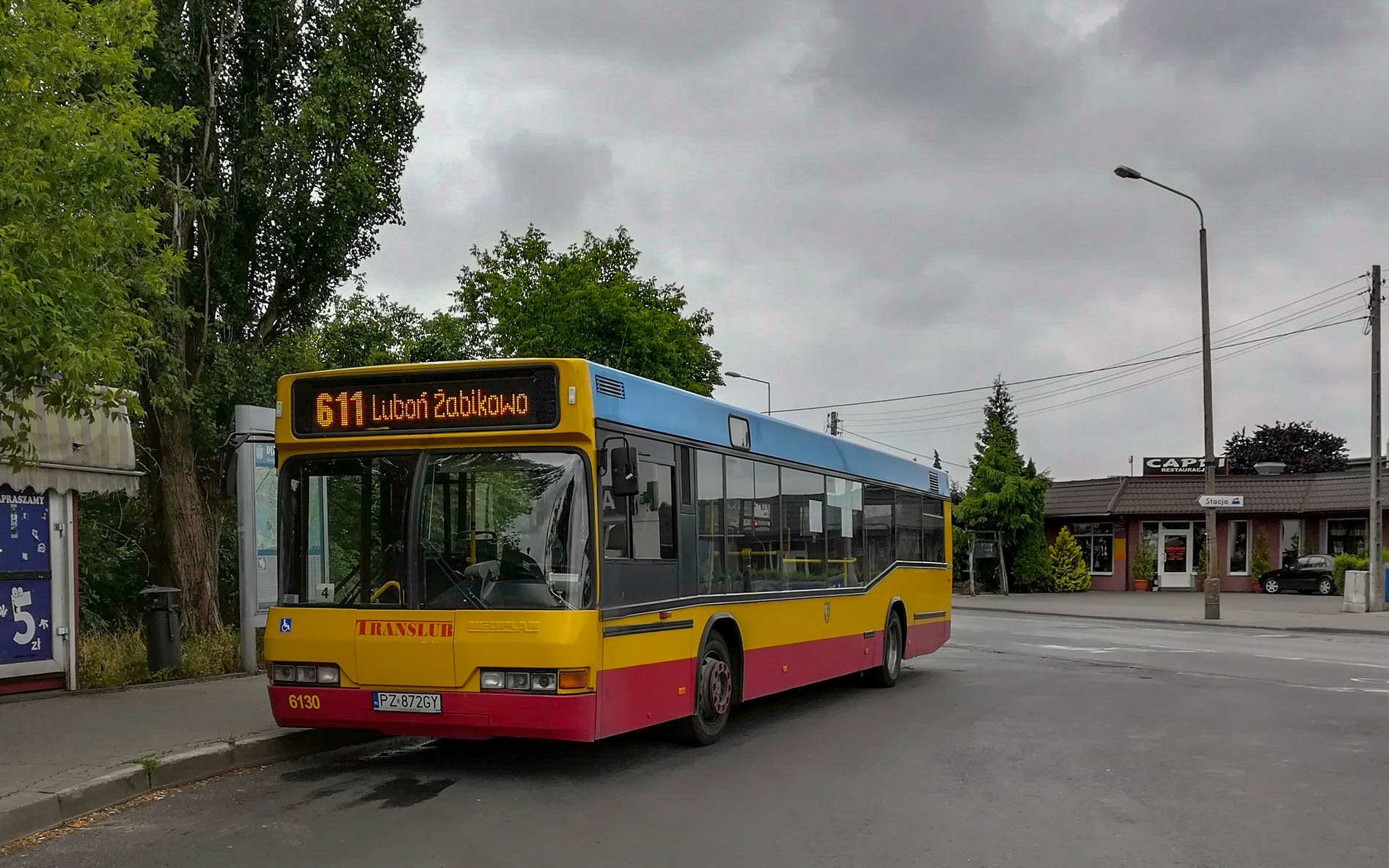
Neoplan N4016

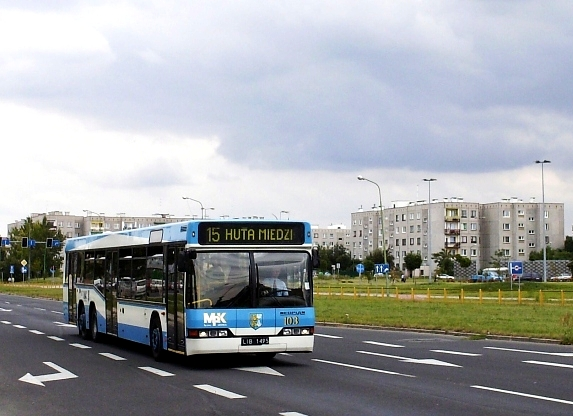
Neoplan N4020

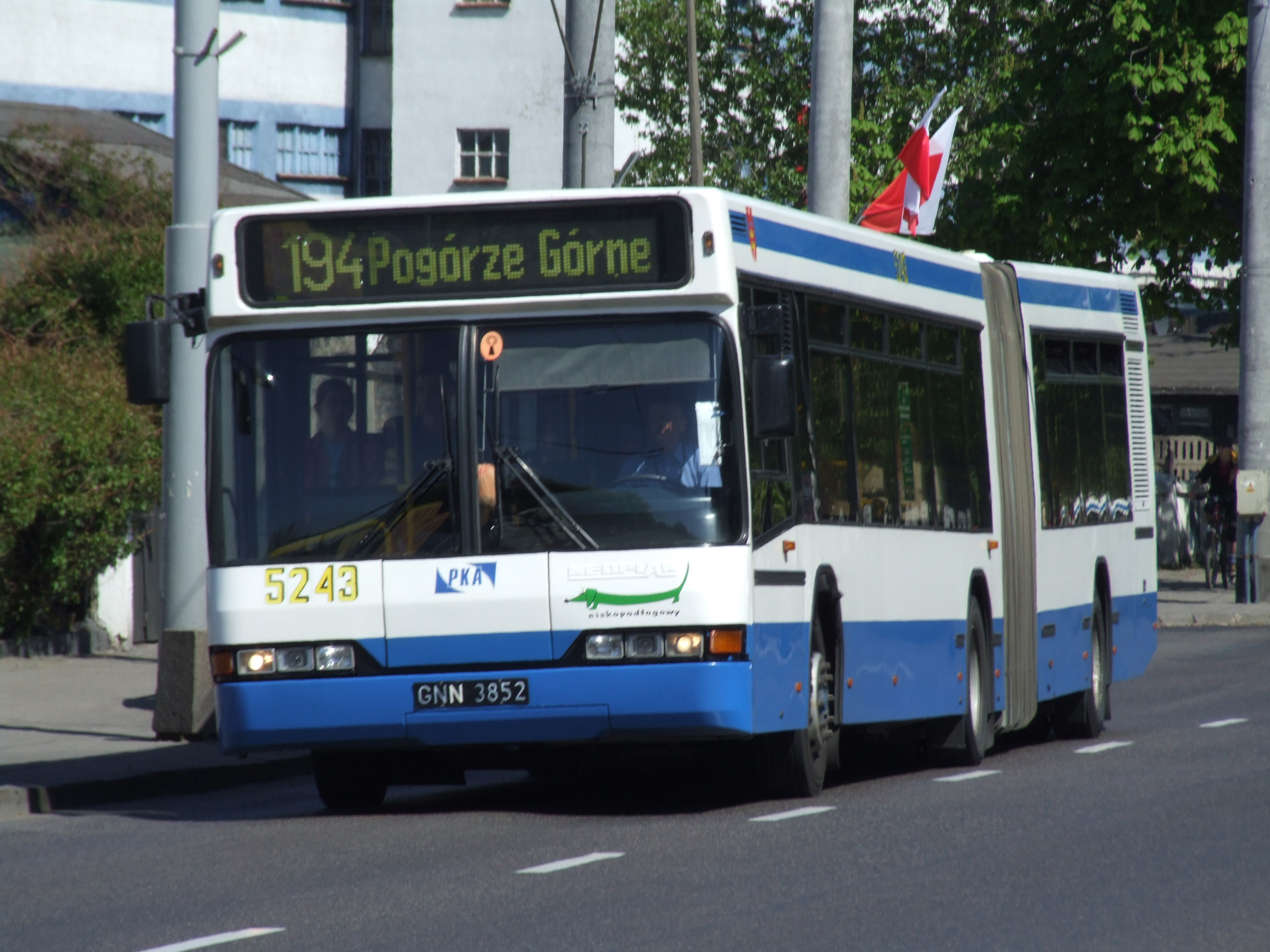
Neoplan N4021

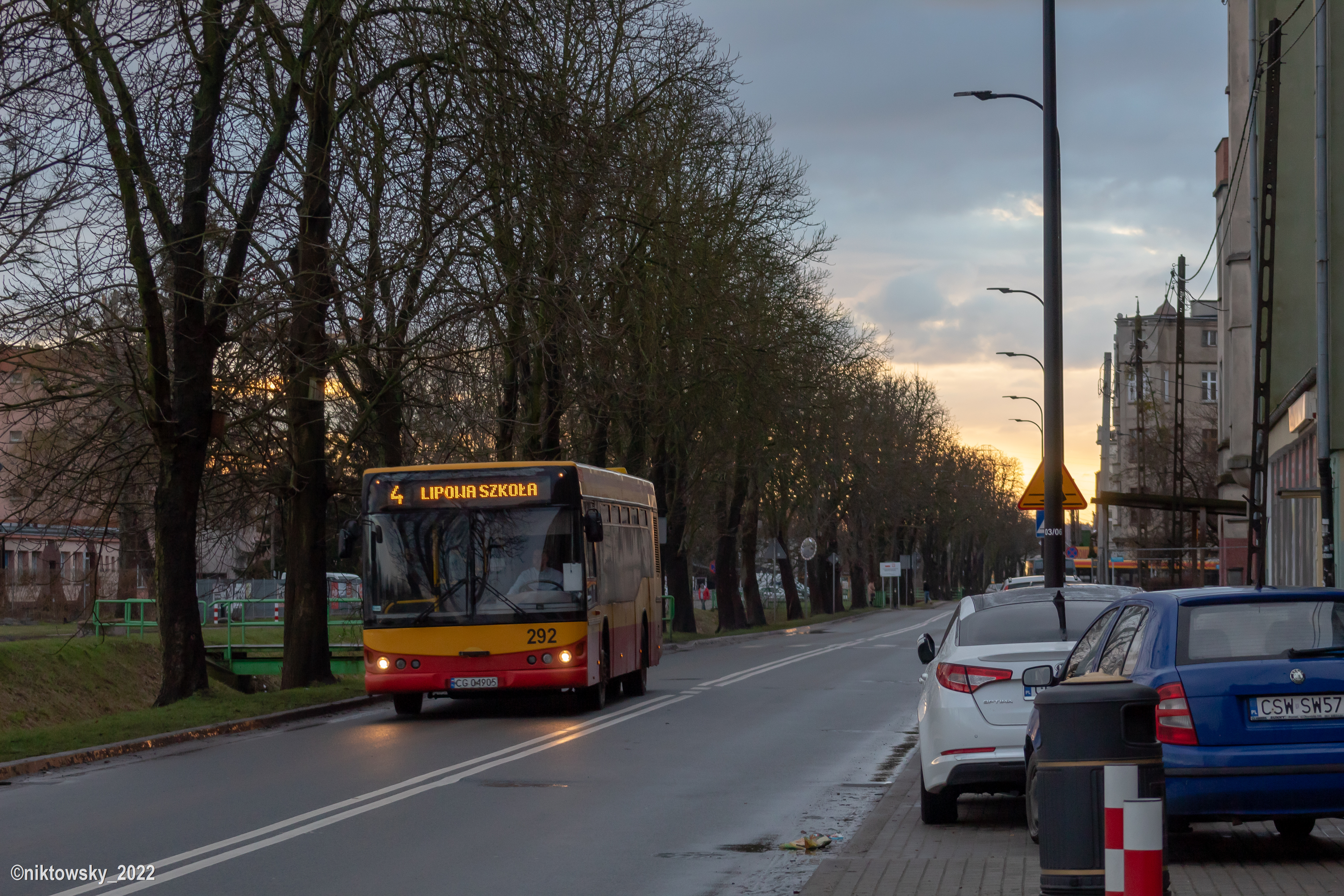
Neoplan K4016td

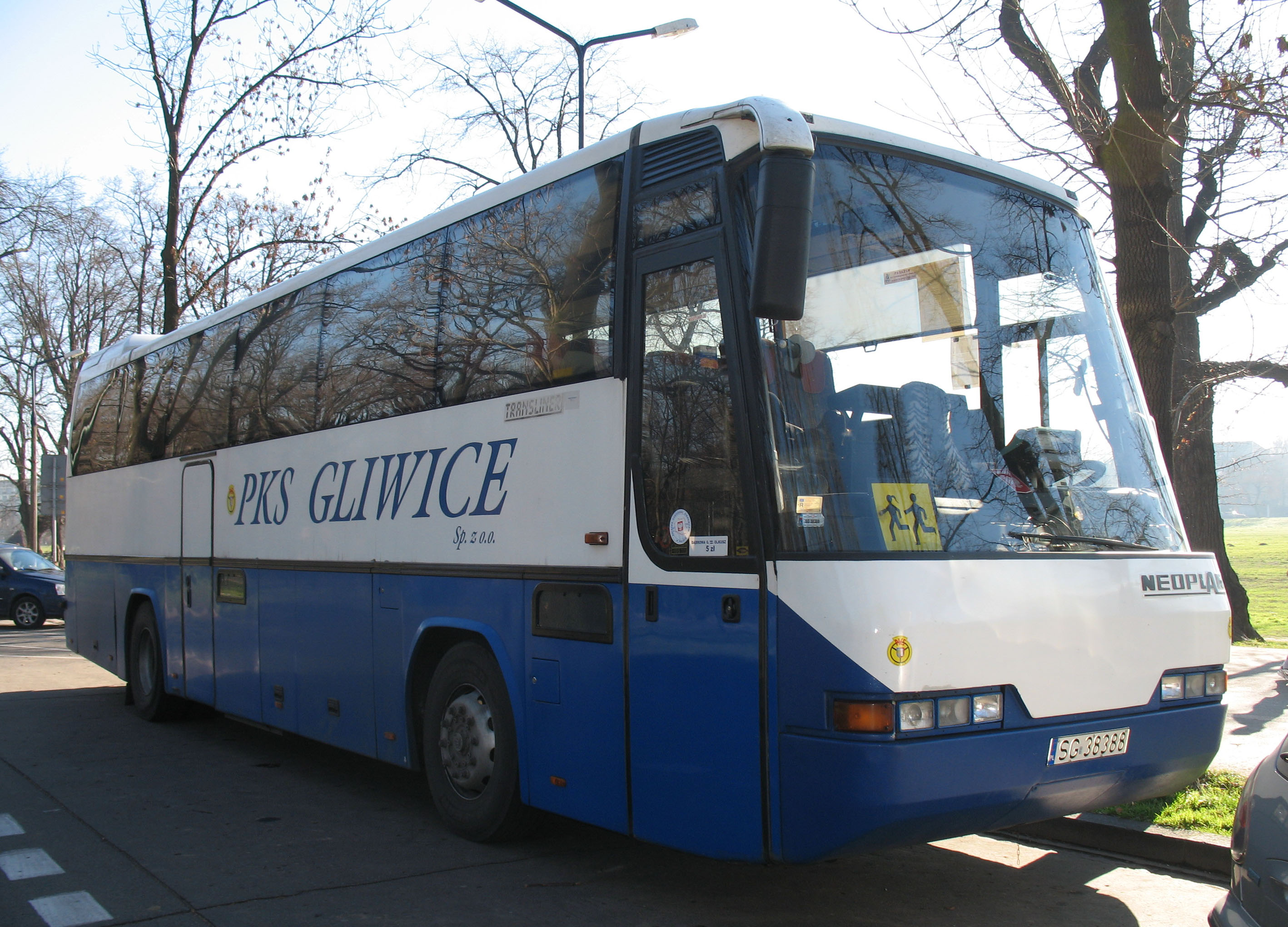
Neoplan Transliner

=== Acquisition by CAF ===
On 5 September 2018 Construcciones y Auxiliar de Ferrocarriles (CAF) finalised its acquisition of Solaris Bus & Coach. This was following an announcement on 3 July 2018. Additionally, CAF has entered into an agreement with the Polish Development Fund for the acquisition by the latter of a minority stake in Solaris (35%) in the same terms and conditions agreed in by CAF in the acquisition of Solaris. On 4 October 2018, Javier Calleja was named CEO. On 1 January 2023, Javier Iriarte took over as CEO of Solaris.

=== Planned North American market entry ===
In August and September 2023, Solaris tested its Trollino trolleybus in Vancouver, British Columbia, Canada, in the first operation of a Solaris bus in North America. The company has announced its intentions to enter the U.S. and Canadian markets in the following years, offering only trolley, battery-electric, and hydrogen fuel cell buses. In April 2024, Solaris secured its first order for transit buses in North America, with an order for five Urbino NAe40 12-meter (40-foot) battery-electric buses from MTA Regional Bus Operations in New York City.

The company's first U.S. contract, with King County Metro in Seattle, was signed in December 2024. It comprises two 40-foot (12 m) units and two 60-foot (18 m) articulated buses, with options for 12 more vehicles. On 5 March 2025, Solaris announced that they landed a contract for 107 electric trolleybuses in Vancouver, Canada, for TransLink.

== Models ==
=== City and intercity buses ===
The first buses of the Solaris Urbino family were designed by a group of Polish engineers in collaboration with Berlin-based designer office IFS Designatelier under the leadership of Krzysztof Olszewski. In May 1999, at the Poznań International Fair Motor Show, the company unveiled its low-floor city bus MAXI class Solaris Urbino 12. Two other models of the MEGA class premièred that same year – the Solaris Urbino 15 and the Solaris Urbino 18. 2000 saw the market launch of the smallest member of the bus family – Solaris Urbino 9. A bodyframe made completely of stainless steel and the asymmetric front windscreen are turning into typical features of all buses of the Urbino family. The new series of city buses was characterised by the modern design and innovative technical solutions (e.g. the asymmetric line of the front windscreen improves the driver's field of vision). The first generation buses were made chiefly for the Polish market. In March 2000 the company sold the first vehicle to a non-Polish company; the Solaris Urbino 15 went to DPO from the Czech city of Ostrava. The first-generation Solaris Urbino buses have also made it to Slovakia, Latvia, and Germany.

The second generation Urbinos premièred in 2002. The manufacturer introduced small modifications compared to the predecessors, so the second generation was a transition between the first and the third edition of the Urbino. What is more, the new Solaris Urbino 10 was introduced, replacing the Urbino 9. The year 2002 was also a historic moment for the company, as it marks the first time that export sales double and foreign orders exceed the volume of domestic commissions

2002 saw also the unveiling of the first Solaris intercity bus, dubbed Solaris Valletta for commercial purposes. The vehicle was designed for a regional operator, based in Valletta, Malta. It was the first right-hand drive Solaris bus model. 2004 saw also the début of the intercity low-entry bus model Solaris Urbino 12 LE.

In September 2004, the third generation of Solaris Urbino buses had its debut; serial production of those models kicked off in spring 2005. Many style and construction modifications were undertaken. It is this model that enabled the company's global success internationally. Moreover, in 2004, the company presented also the Solaris Urbino 15 CNG model – the first Solaris bus running on compressed natural gas. The Solaris Urbino participated in a contest titled Bus of the Year 2005, where it came second, losing by a whisker to MAN Lion's City. In 2006, Solaris became the first European manufacturer to present a serially produced hybrid drive bus – the Solaris Urbino 18 hybrid. In 2011 the company also launched a hybrid model of 12 meters.

In 2006 the company launched production of a 15 cm shorter model, 8.6 m long, i.e. the model Solaris Alpino, designed specifically for narrow streets of city centres and also less frequented communication routes. In 2008, the company extended the production line by two low-entry models, the Solaris Alpino 8,9 LE and the Solaris Urbino 15 LE. Also low-floor CNG- or biogas-fuelled models, designed specifically for buyers in Scandinavian countries, were launched around that time.

In mid-2009 the company designed the first prototypes of the intercity bus Solaris InterUrbino 12 which premiered in September 2009 at the Transexpo trade fair.

In September 2011, Solaris presented the prototype of the fully electric MIDI class city bus: the Solaris Urbino 8,9 LE electric. The first buyer of that electric Solaris bus was an Austrian carrier from Klagenfurt. A year later, at the IAA trade fair in Hanover, the producer unveiled the 12-metre version of its electric bus, the Solaris Urbino 12 electric. The first such model was sold in 2013, to an operator in Braunschweig, Germany. That is also, where the first articulated electric buses - the Solaris Urbino 18 electric - went to. In 2014 the producer supplied its innovative city buses Solaris Urbino 18,75 electric to Hamburg; these vehicles were the first to use a hydrogen fuel cell as an additional power source.

In September 2014, during the IAA trade fair in Hanover (world première), and in October that year, at the Transexpo trade fair in Kielce (Polish premiere), Solaris presented the new generation of Solaris Urbino buses – initially only with conventional drives and in the length versions 12 and 18 metres. This time, the producer introduced more modifications to the design compared to the predecessor buses. The design was profoundly amended and many technical innovations were applied. Over the next years, Solaris showed off a range of new generation models (the firm started using that name instead of the fourth generation, to distinguish it from the older model), though it continued to concurrently manufacture vehicles of the third generation.

In 2016 Solaris announced that the new generation Solaris Urbino 12 electric would compete in the “Bus Euro Test 2016” for the title Bus and Coach of the Year 2017. In the contest, the Solaris bus faced off against four competitors – the buses also evaluated in the test were the Mercedes-Benz Citaro C2 NGT, the Van Hool Exqui.City 18, the Irizar i2e and the Ebusco 2.01. Solaris turned out the final winner – thus becoming the first Polish bus to secure this title and the first electric bus ever to win this distinction.

Solaris supplies complete buses, i.e. it does not use the chassis of other manufacturers. However, it does implement components made by other sub-suppliers. It installs diesel engines and CNG engines made by Paccar/DAF, Cummins, whereas the transmissions are supplied by Voith or ZF Friedrichshafen. In the case of hybrid drives, Solaris vehicles use BAE Systems.

On 29 November 2016 Solaris became the leader of a technological cluster named “Polish Electric Bus - supply chain for electromobility”. The goal of the cluster is the design of electric buses, batteries and charging options. The cluster consists of: Akademia Górniczo-Hutnicza (University of Science and Technology), Politechnika Poznańska (Poznań University of Technology), Politechnika Warszawska (Warsaw University of Technology), EC Grupa, Ekoenergetyka Polska, Impact Clean Power Technology, Medcom, Instytut Napędów i Maszyn Elektrycznych KOMEL and SKB Drive. Later on companies El-Cab and ENEA joined the cluster.

In 2019, a hydrogen-powered Solaris Urbino 12 hydrogen bus premiered at the UITP exhibition in Stockholm. In the same year, the first order for buses of this type was secured for Bolzano, Italy. In 2020, the manufacturer offer included the Solaris Urbino 15 LE, the first model of an electrobus designed for suburban and intercity transport, and the Solaris Urbino 12 mild-hybrid. In 2021, the Urbino 8.9 LE electric model was replaced by the new fourth-generation Urbino 9 LE electric. In the same year, the Solaris Urbino 24 electric MetroStyle 24-meter model was announced, based on a new platform of 24-meter electric, hybrid or as a trolleybus. In September 2022, Solaris unveiled its Urbino 18 hydrogen bus – the company's second hydrogen bus.

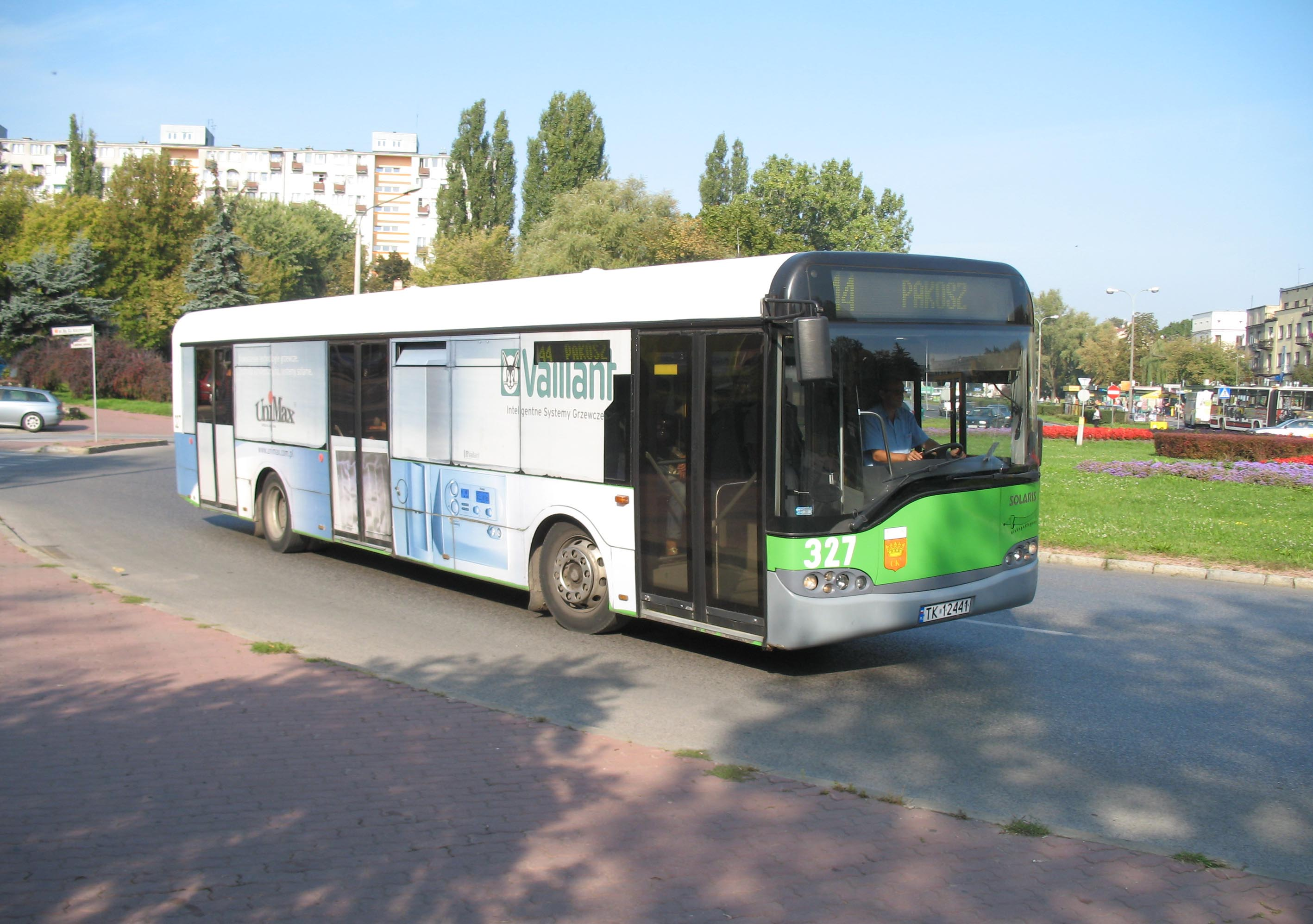
Solaris Urbino 12 of I generation

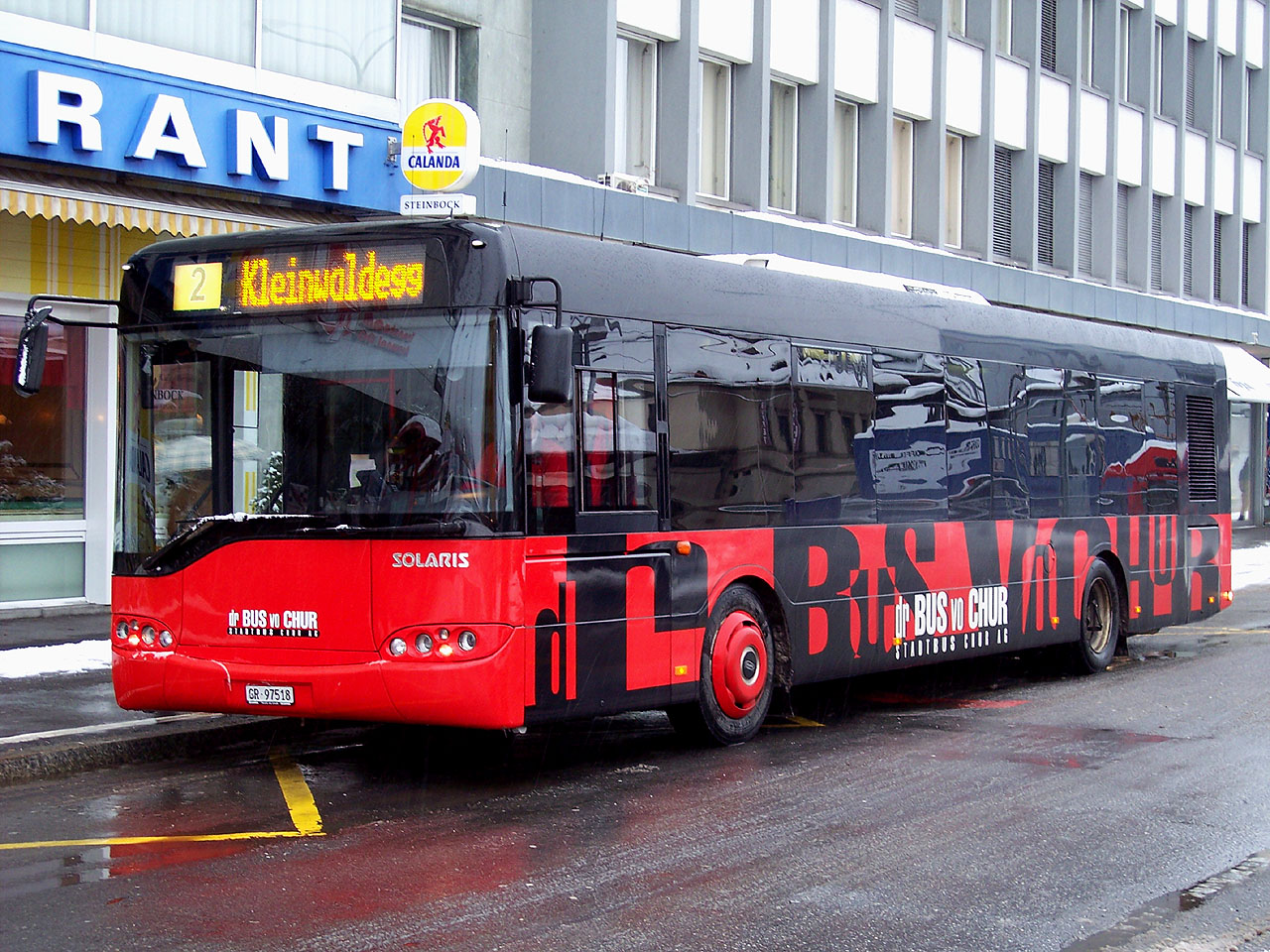
Solaris Urbino 12 of II generation

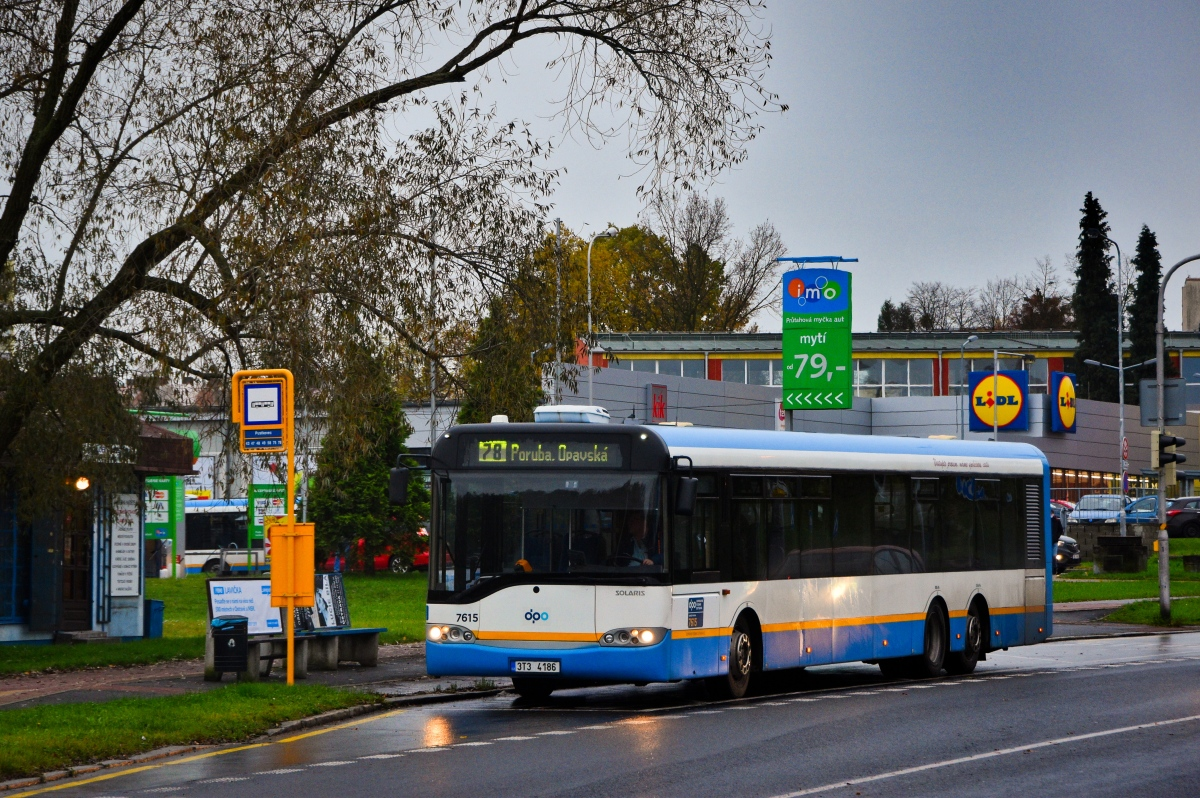
Solaris Urbino 15 of II generation

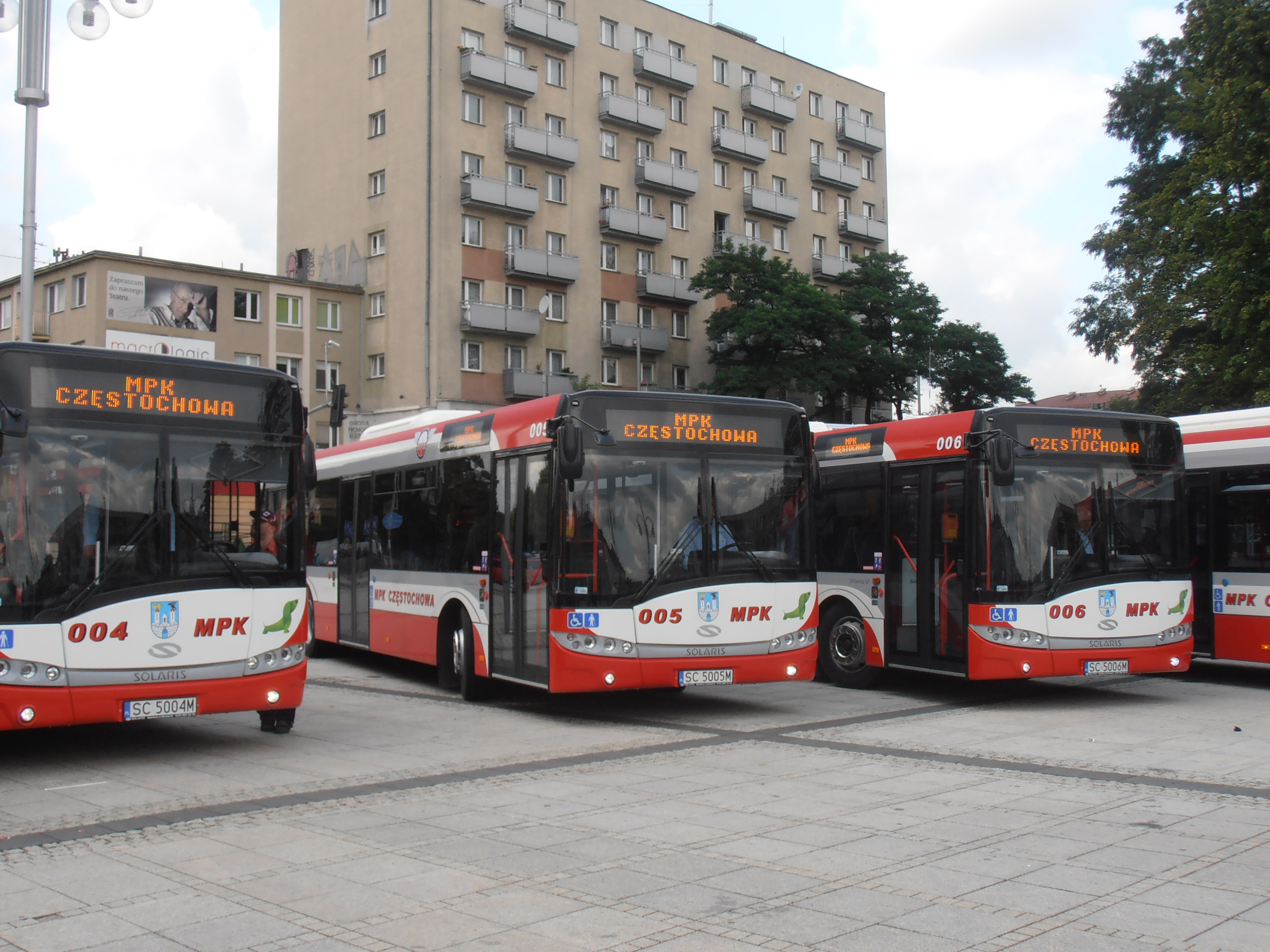
Solaris Urbino 12 of III generation

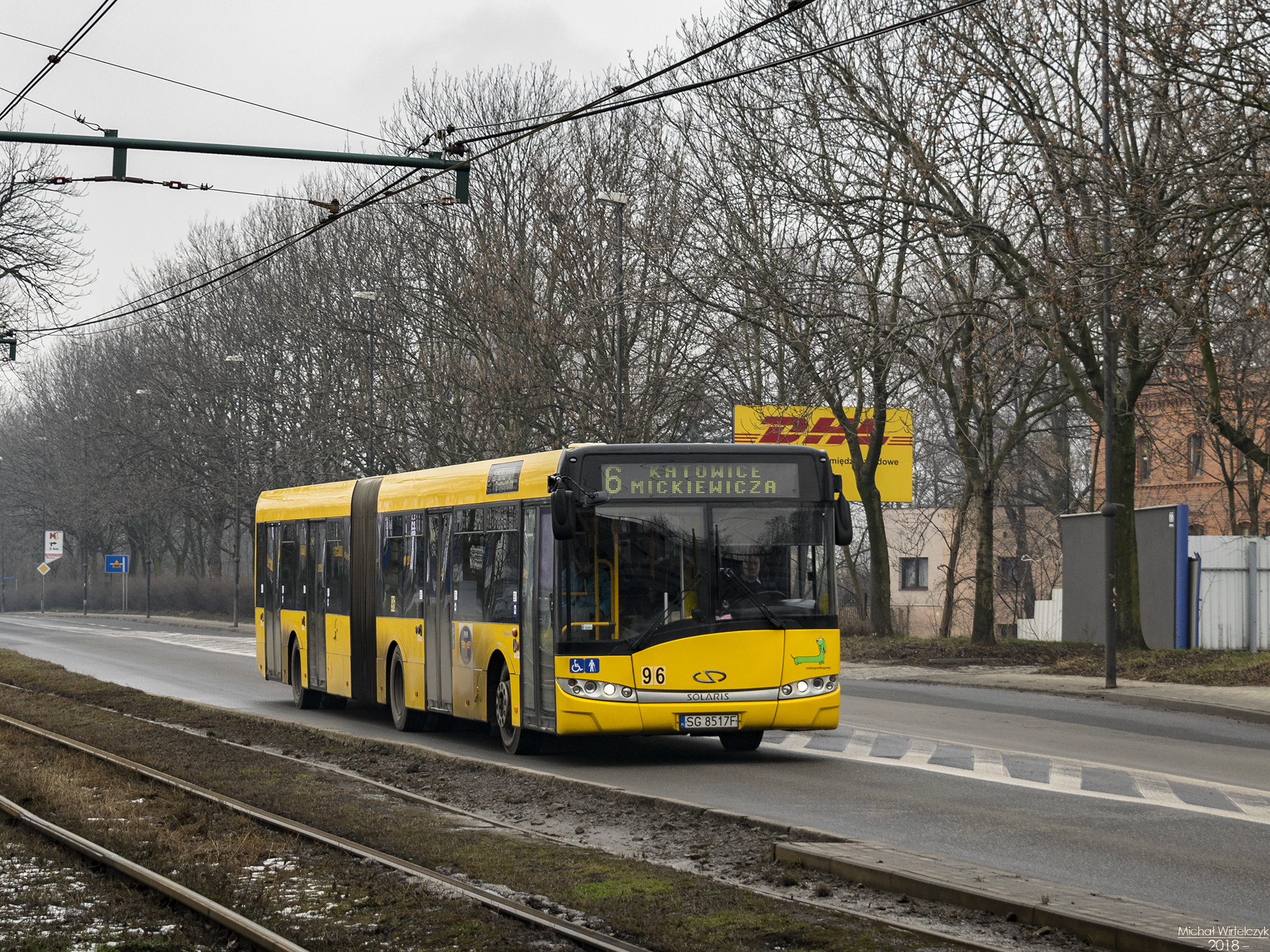
Solaris Urbino 18 of III generation

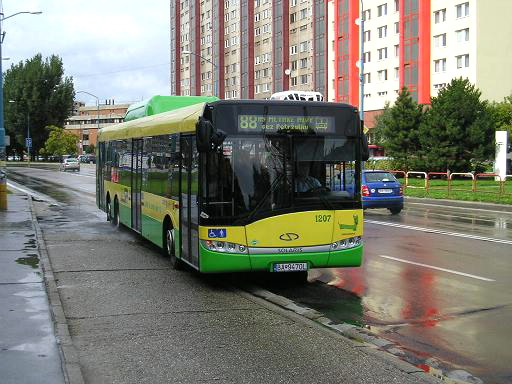
Solaris Urbino 15 CNG of III generation

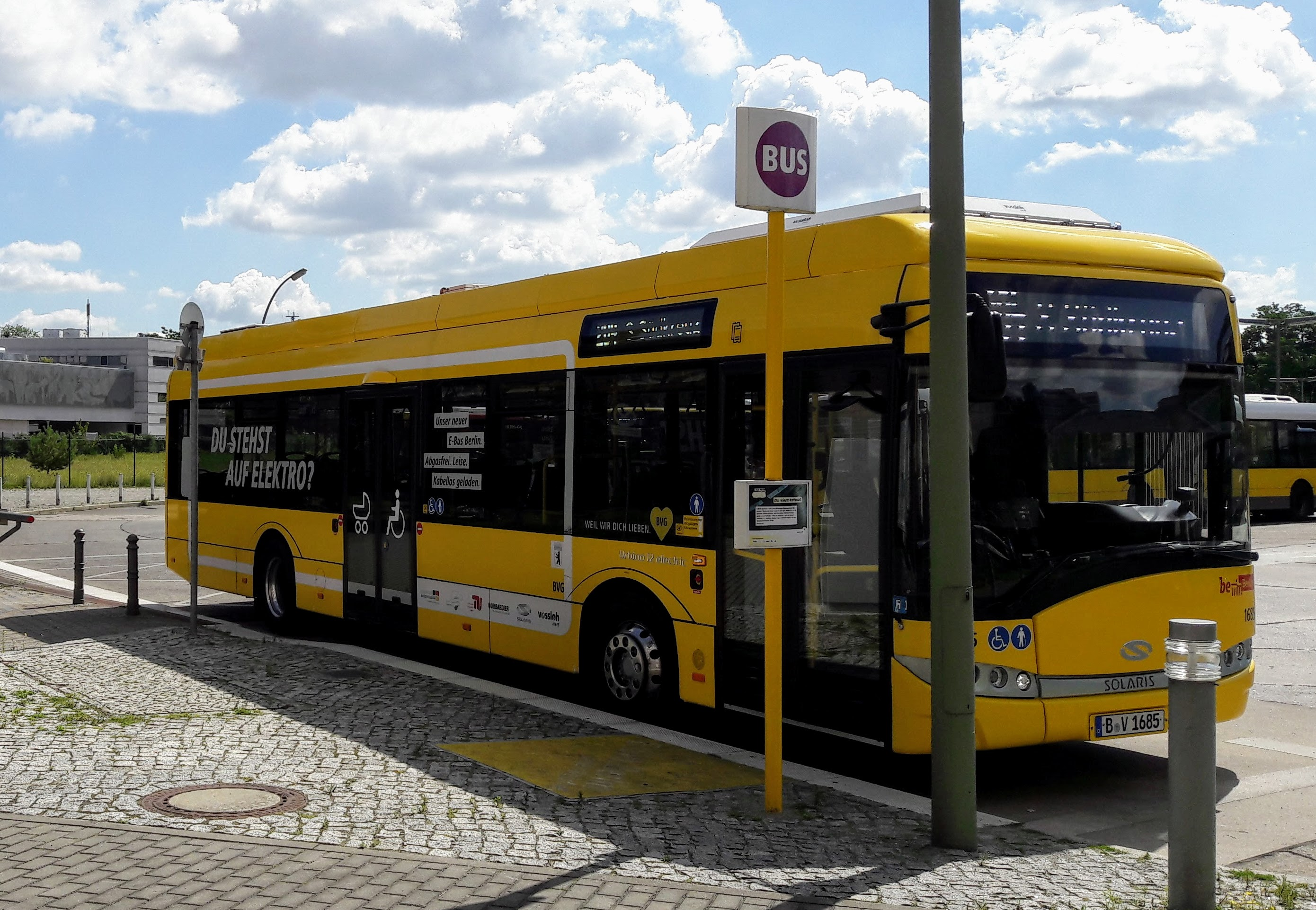
Solaris Uebino 12 electric of III generation

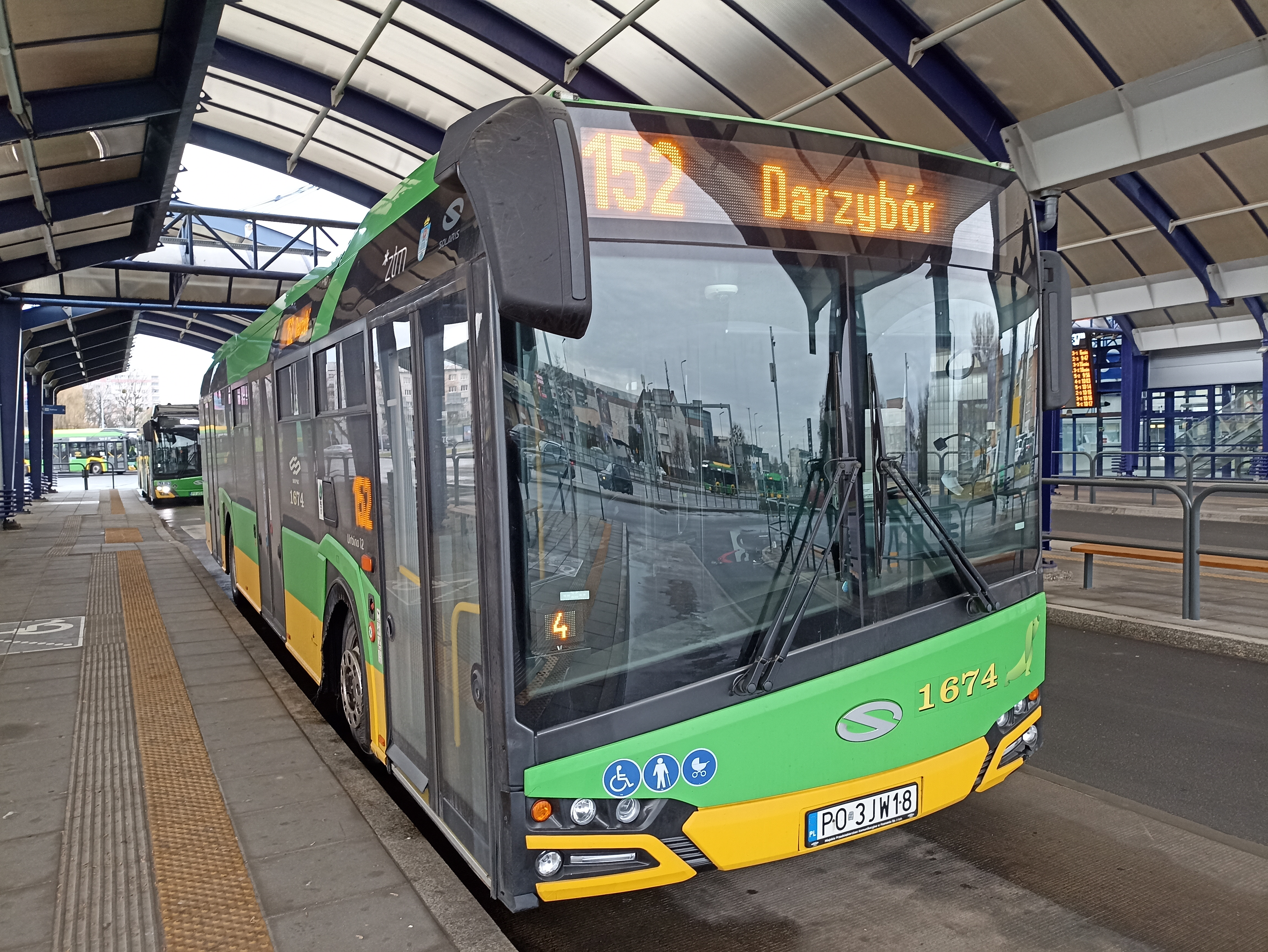
Solaris Urbino 12 of IV generation

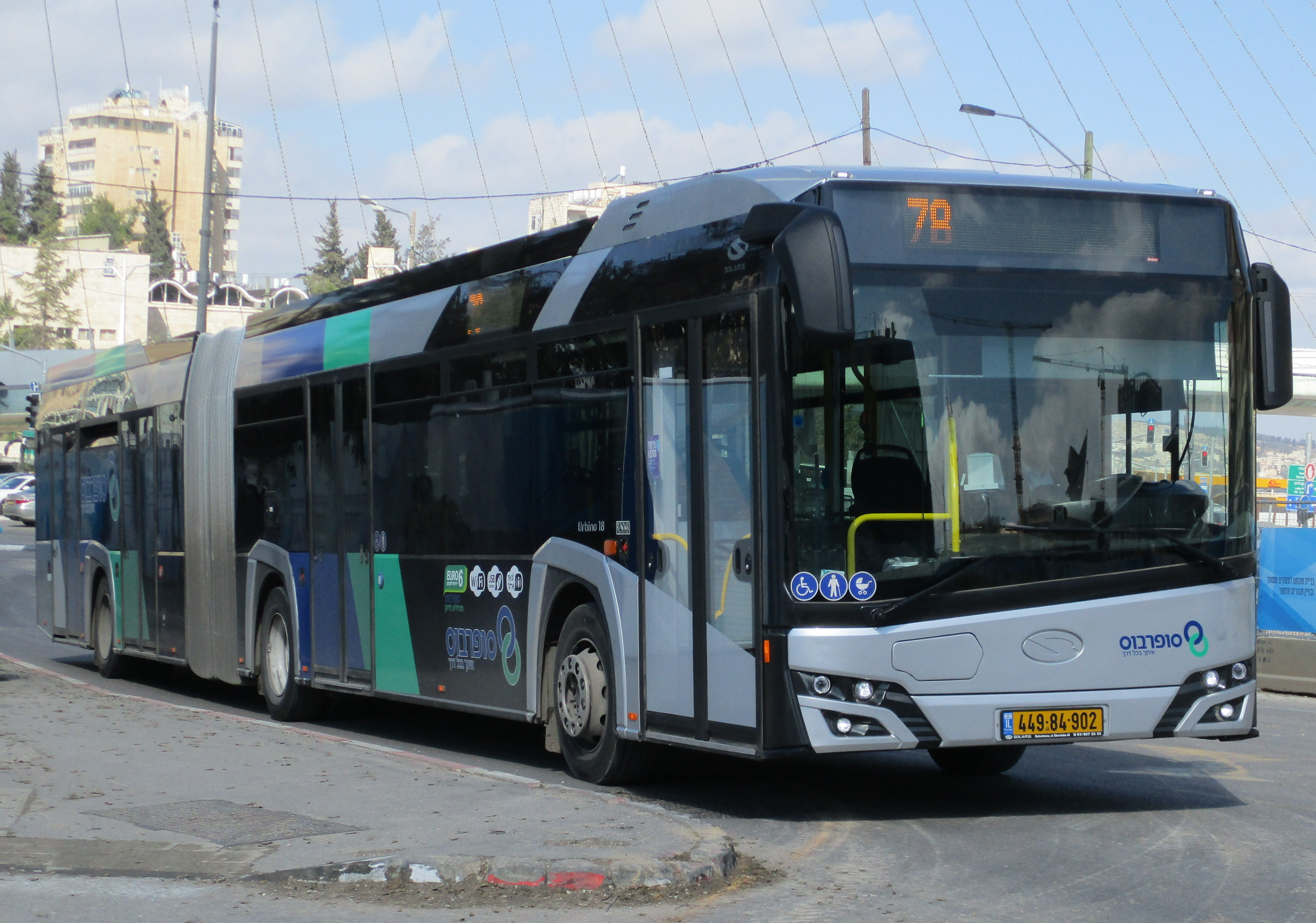
Solaris Urbino 18 of IV generation

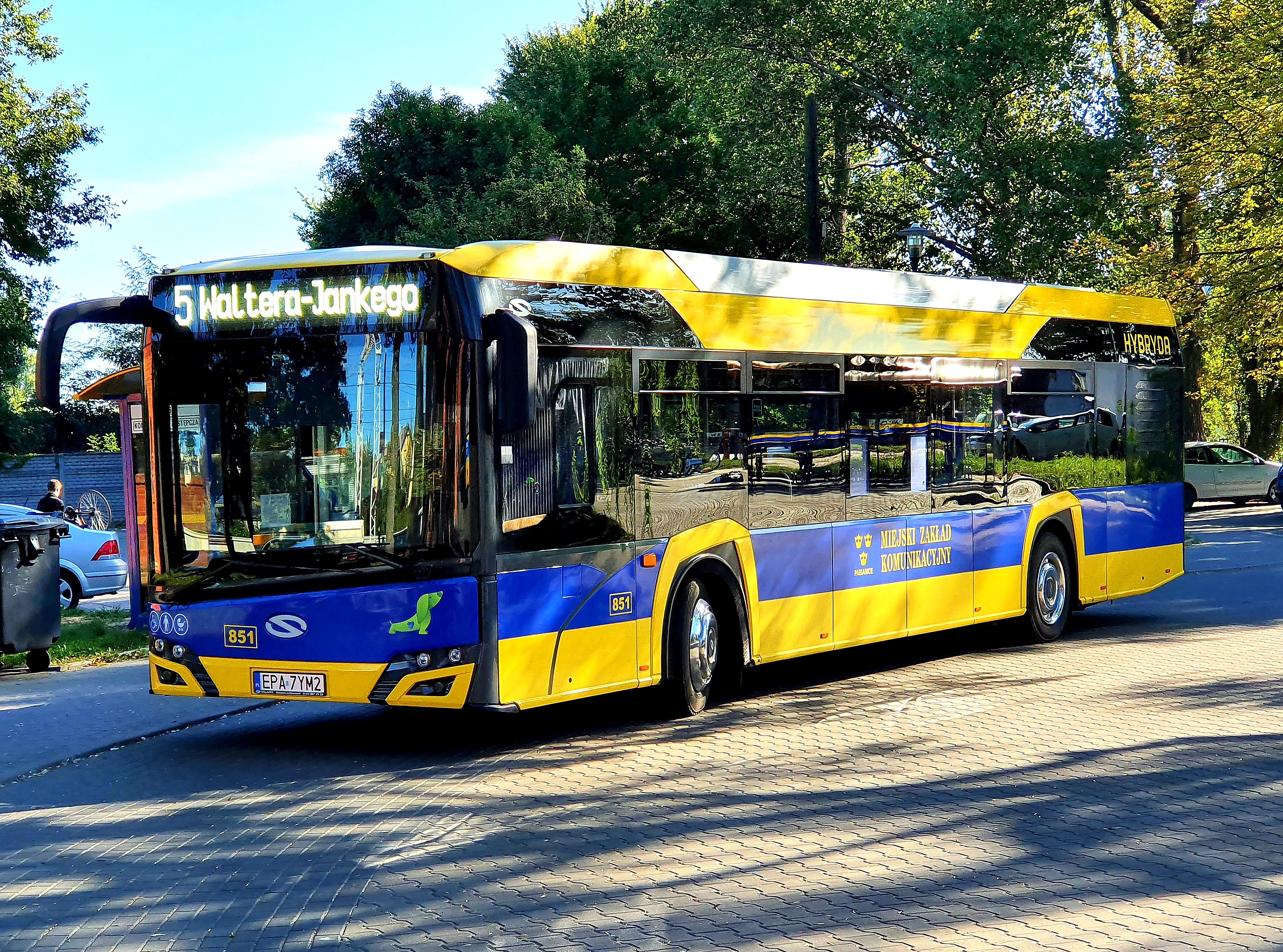
Solaris Urbino 12 hybrid of IV generation

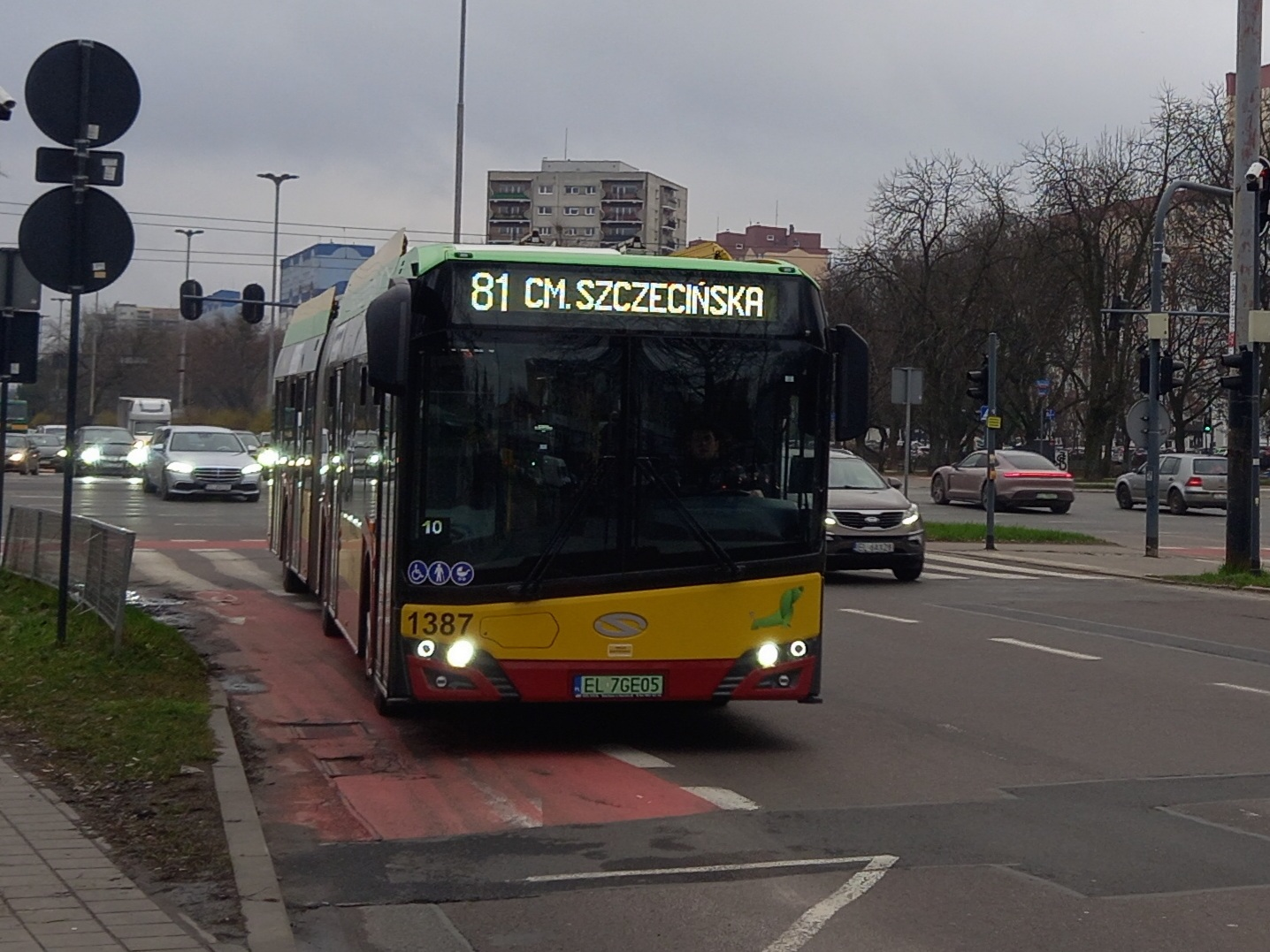
Solaris Urbino 18 electric of IV generation

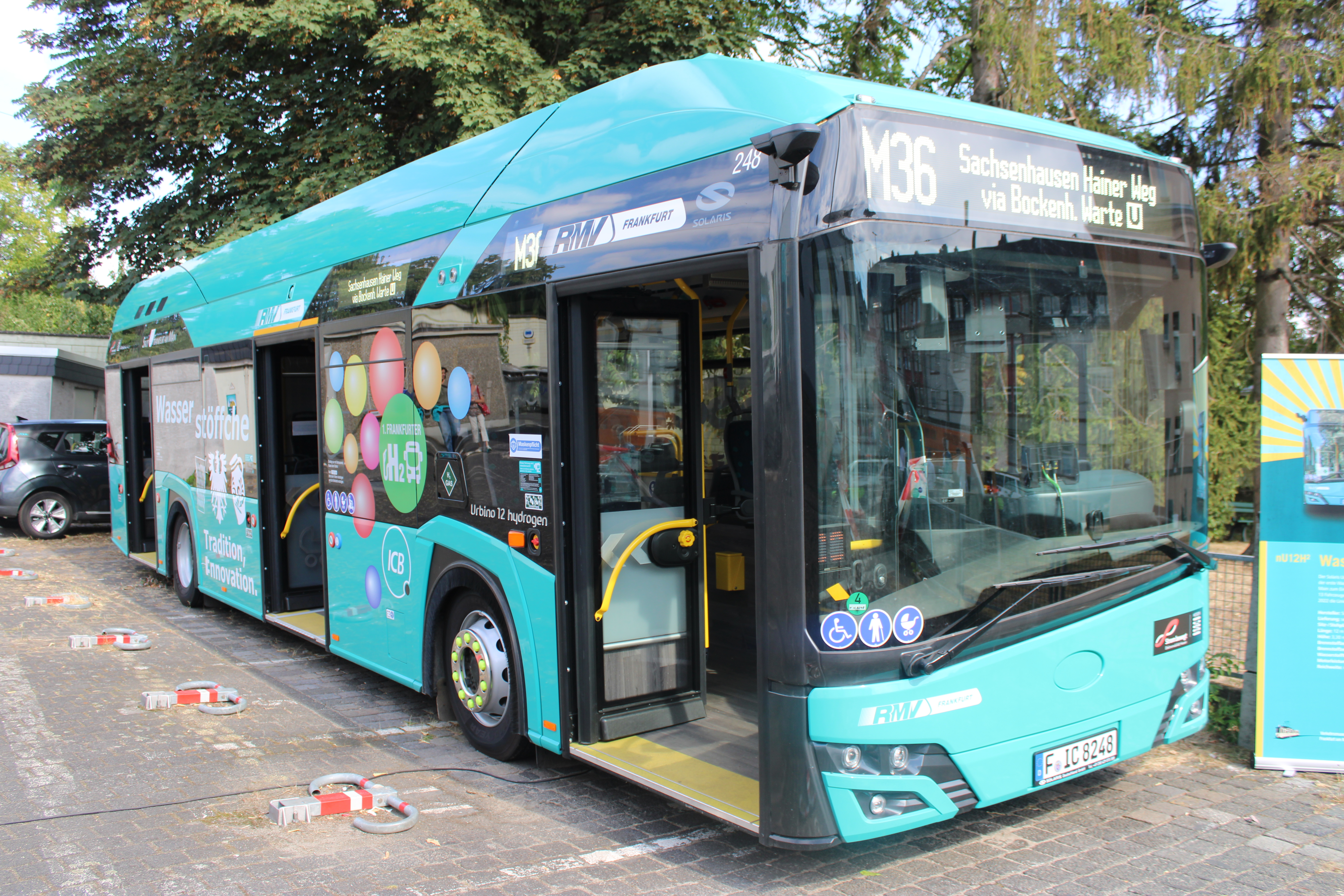
Solaris Urbino 12 hydrogen

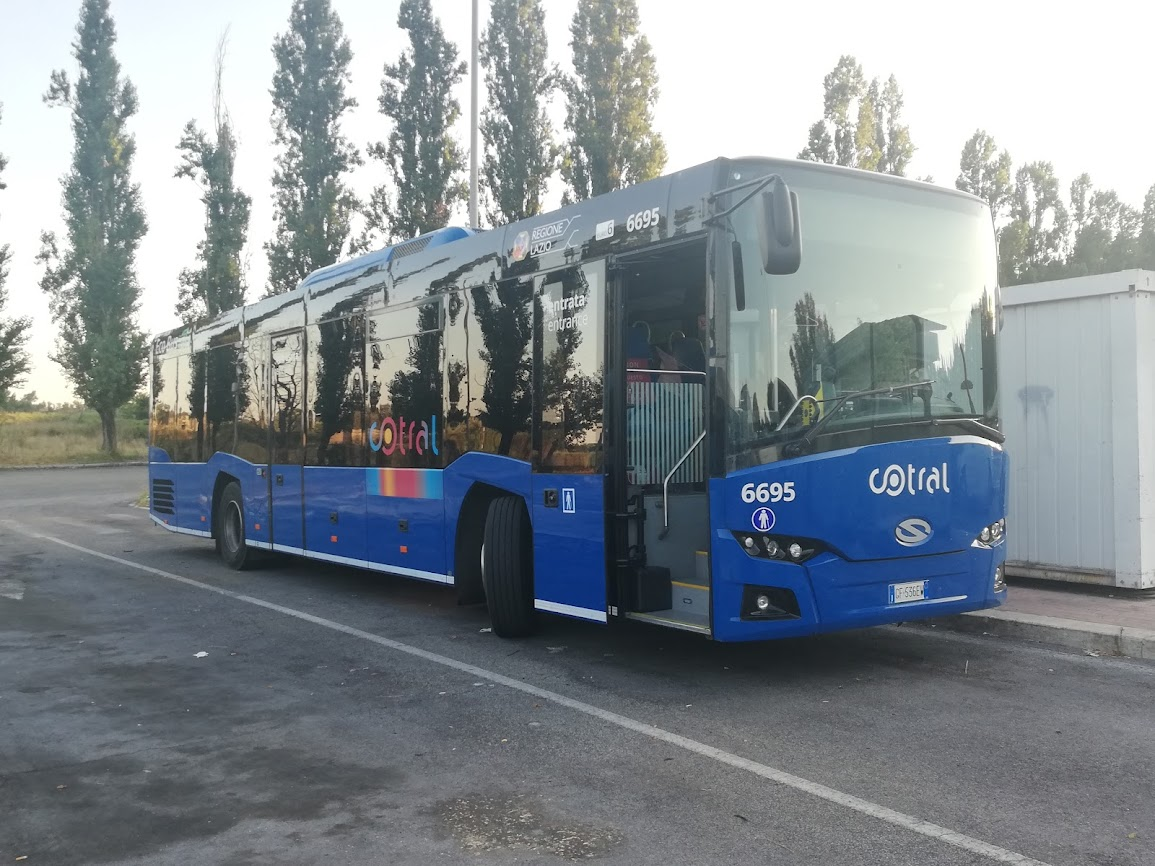
Solaris InterUrbino 12 of II generation

=== Coaches ===
In the first years of operation, Neoplan Polska also handled the assembly of the coaches Neoplan Transliner and Neoplan Skyliner. Serial production of the tourist coach of the company's own design Solaris Vacanza 12 began one year after the official unveiling in August 2001. The design of these coaches was drafted by the Berlin-based enterprise IFS Designatelier. A characteristic feature of these vehicles is the wedge-shaped bodywork line. Engines made by DAF were used for the driveline. In 2004, the company launched production of the longer model Solaris Vacanza 13. In 2003 the Solaris Vacanza was ranked second (ex aequo with the Volvo 9700) in the contest Coach of the Year 2004, right behind such brands as MAN Lion's Star and Scania Irizar PB, which took the first place ex aequo. Due to limited sales, Solaris decided to eliminate them from its offerings in 2011.

In 2002 Solaris assembled its first special-purpose vehicle - a mobile blood donation station based on the Vacanza coach. Solaris bloodmobiles have been used in many Polish cities, but have also been sold to Riga. In 2018, Solaris presented the first fully electric special vehicle for blood donation, based on the Urbino 8.9 LE model.

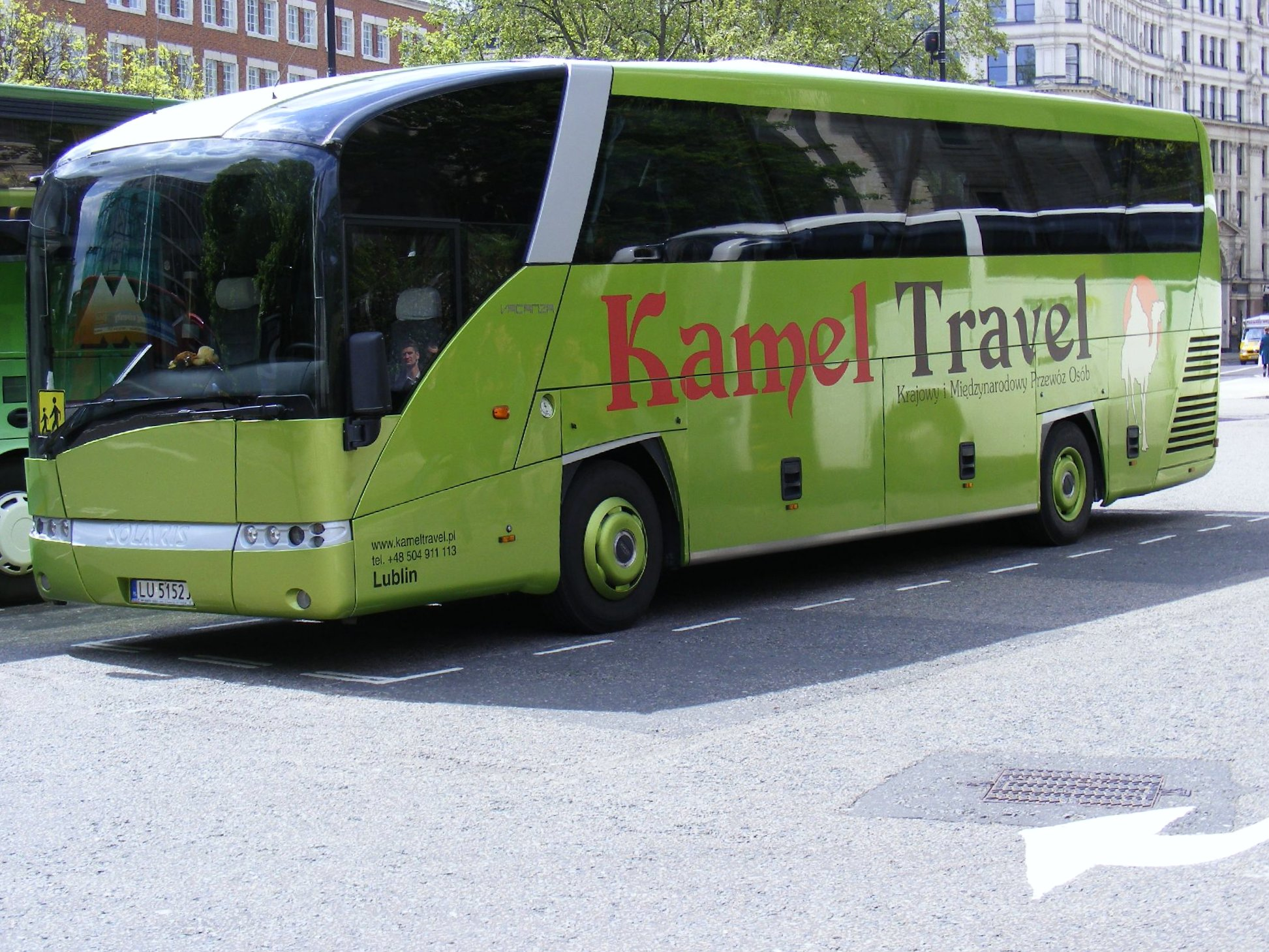
Solaris Vacanza 12

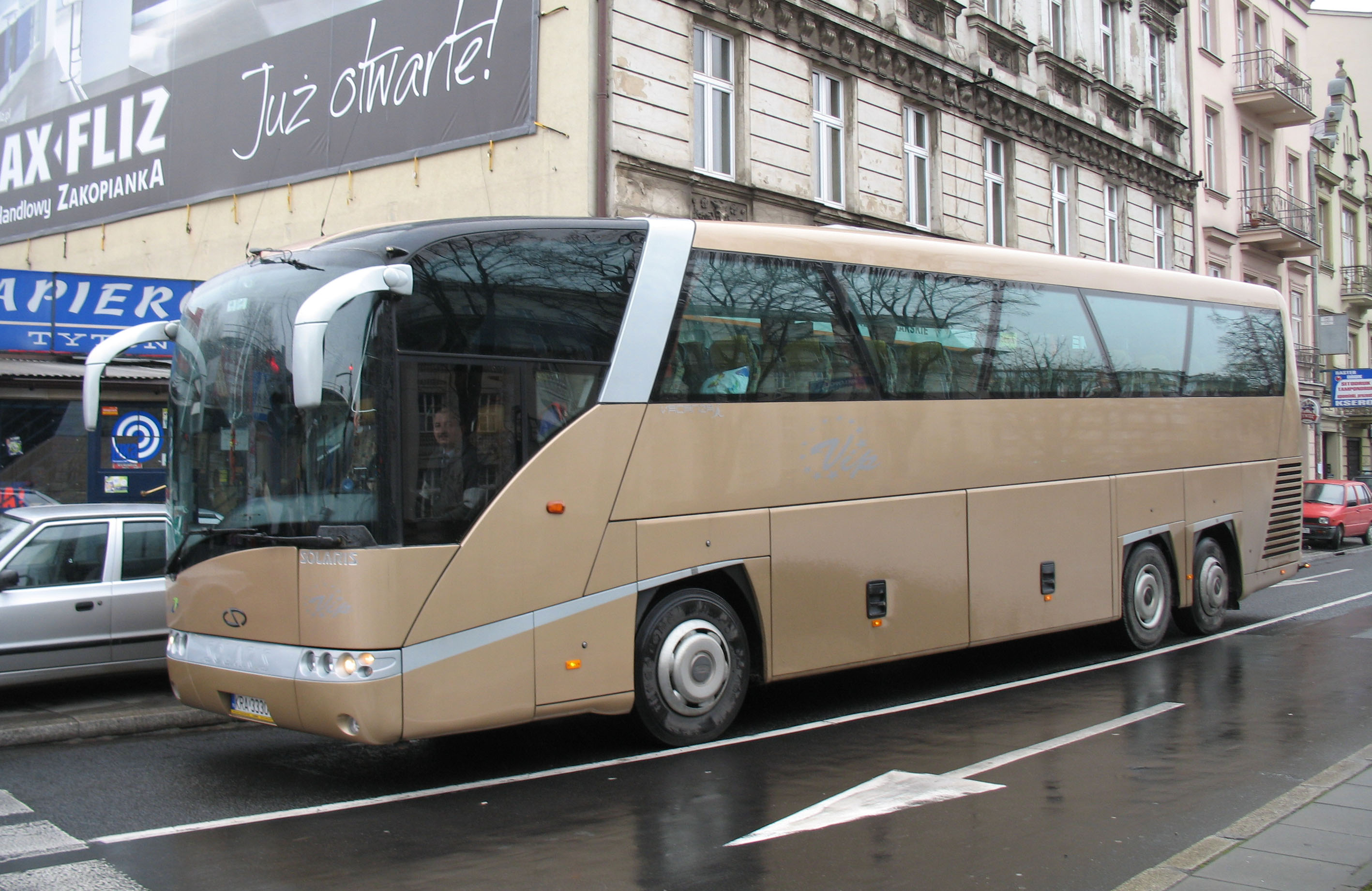
Solaris Vacanza 13

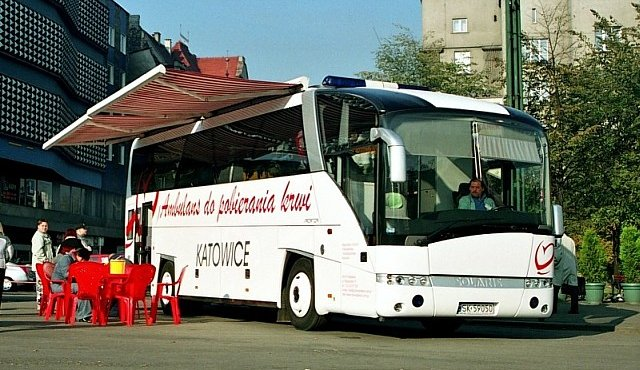
Solaris Vacanza 12 as a blood donation vehicle

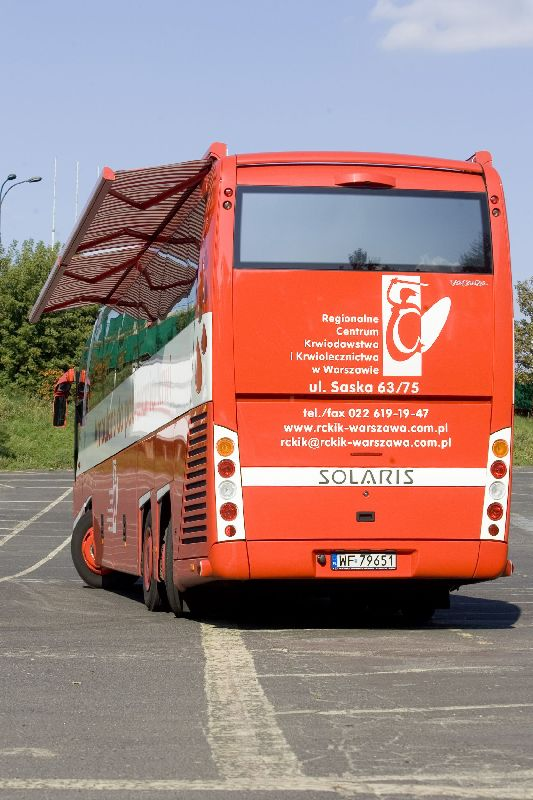
Solaris Vacanza 13 as a blood donation vehicle

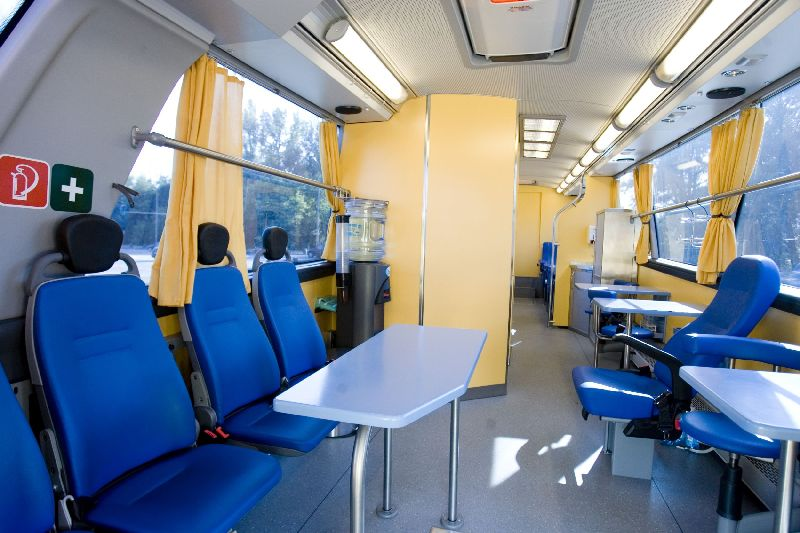
Blood donation vehicle interior

=== Trolleybuses ===
Solaris Trollino trolleybuses have been produced since 2001, based on low-floor buses of the Solaris Urbino series. The first Trollino 12 units were created in collaboration with PKT Gdynia. In 2002, the company launched serial production of longer trolleybuses, namely 15-metre and 18-metre versions. The Solaris Trollino 15 was the first trolleybus in the world of that length. Originally, the vehicles were made with drives manufactured by Hungarian company Ganz Transelektro and Czech firm Cegelec. In spring 2007, Solaris and the firm Medcom from Warsaw decided to build a prototype of the trolleybus Solaris Trollino 12, fitted with an asynchronous drive made in Poland. It was created in August 2007 and was then submitted for tests in Lublin. Two more vehicles were made for public operator MPK Lublin. Tychy-based TLT is also authorised to assemble and obtain the type approval for the Trollino model.

Trollino trolleybuses are available in various length versions: 12-, 15- and 18-metre models. In Poland, the Trollino can be encountered on the streets of Gdynia, Tychy and Lublin. They are also used by the Rome trolleybus system (the battery version which enables driving in the city centre while detached from the traction line) and for the trolleybus systems in Riga, Vilnius, Tallinn, Landskrona, Opava and Ostrava. In 2009, the first Solaris trolleybus made it to Portugal, with the purchase of a single Trollino by the Coimbra system. The Solaris Trollino is also available in a special version with a MetroStyle bodywork that has an affinity to the style of the Solaris Tramino tram. Trolleybuses of that type have been supplied to Salzburg, Esslingen and Castellón de la Plana.

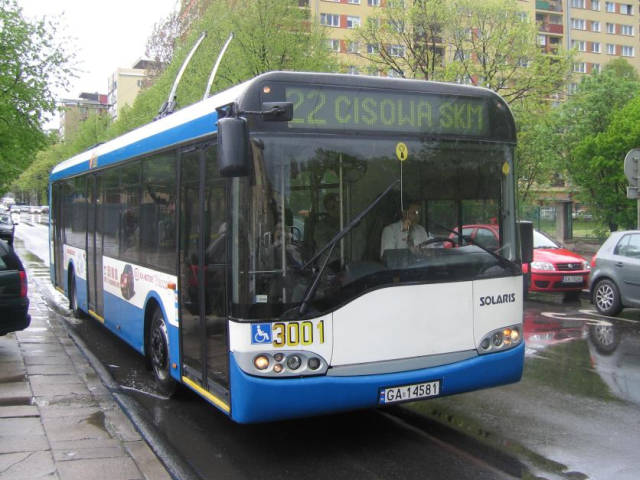
Solaris Trollino 12 of I generation

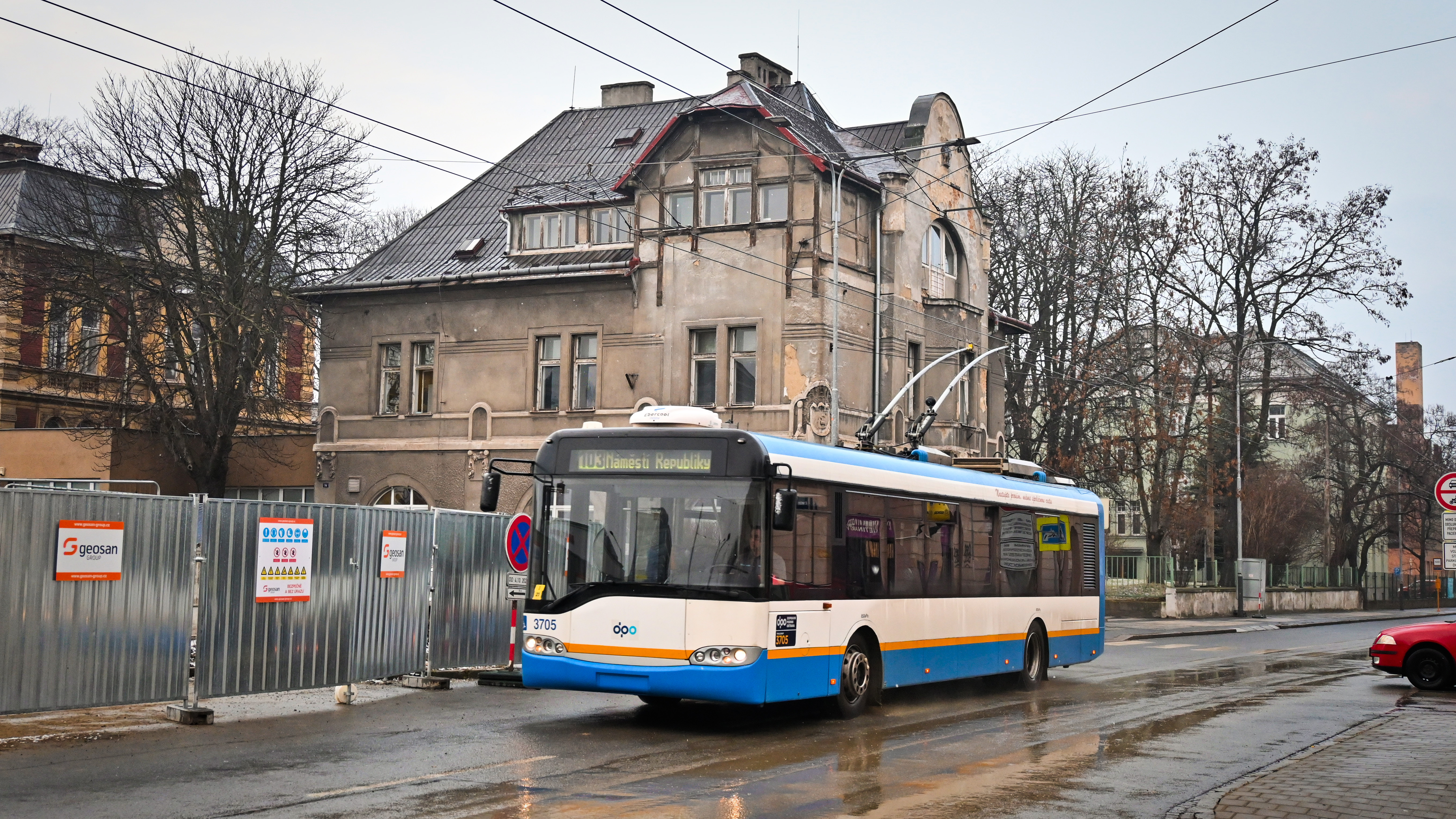
Solaris Trollino 12 of II generation

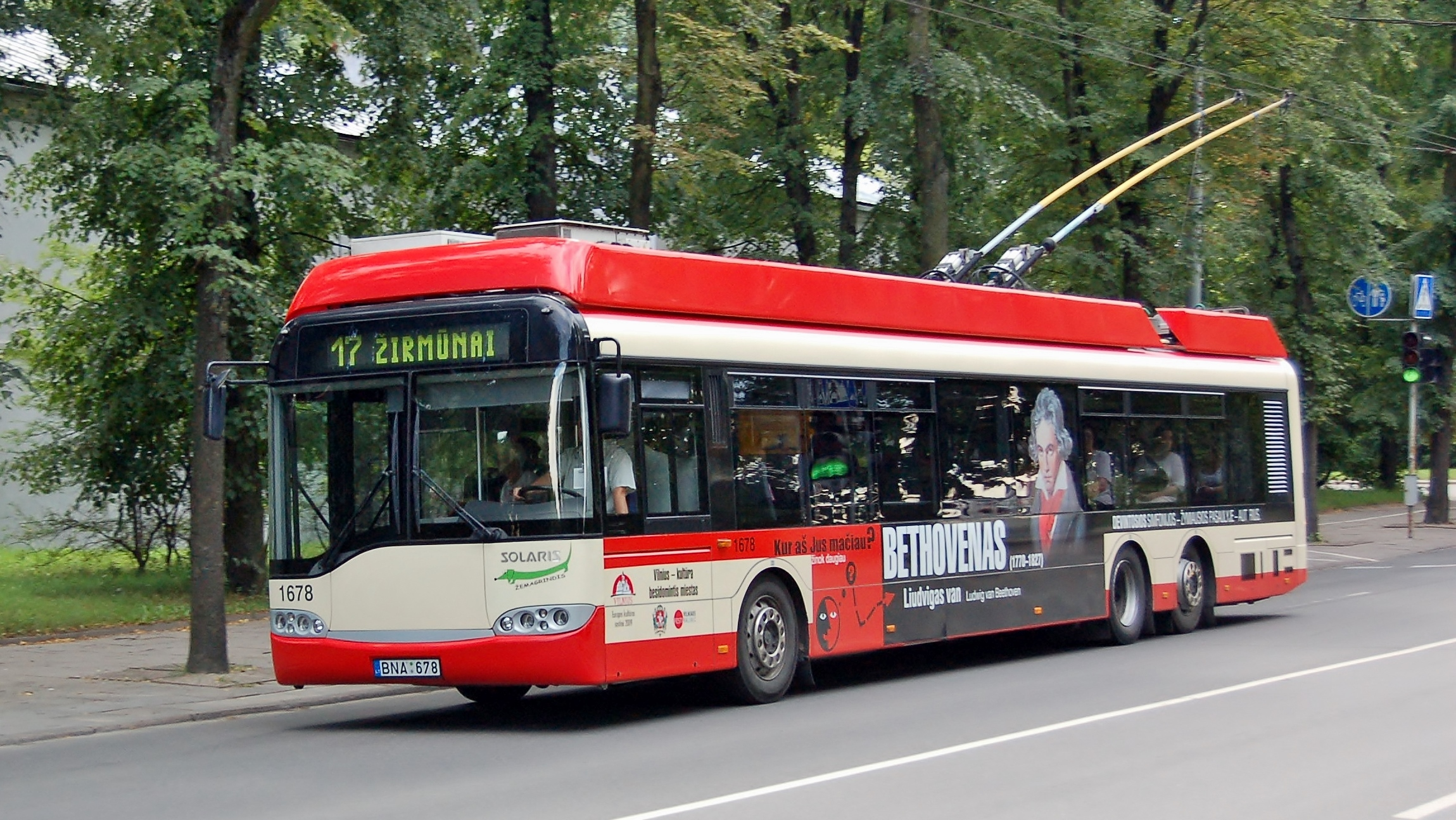
Solairs Trollino 15 of II generation

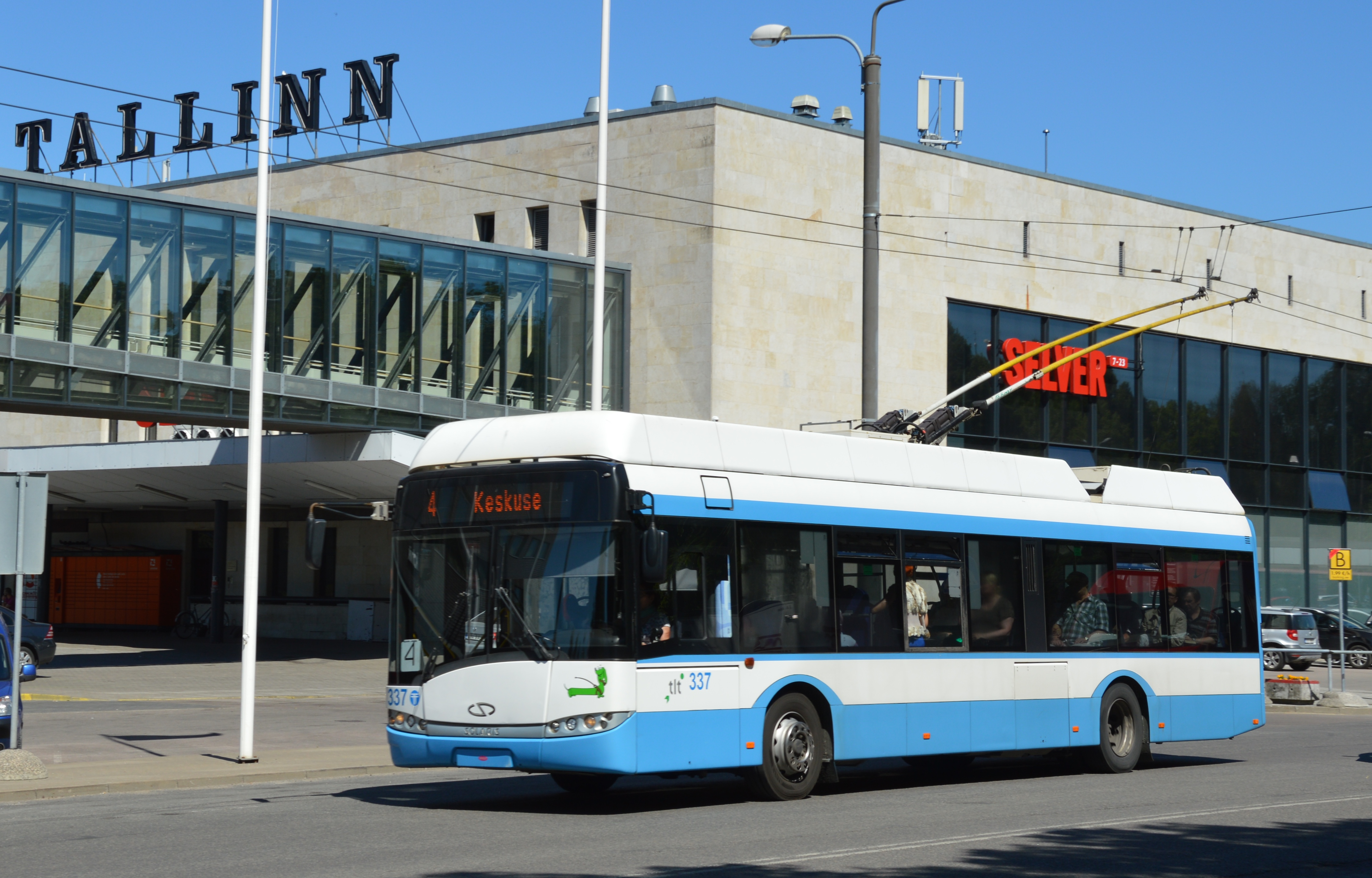
Solaris Trollino 12 of III generation

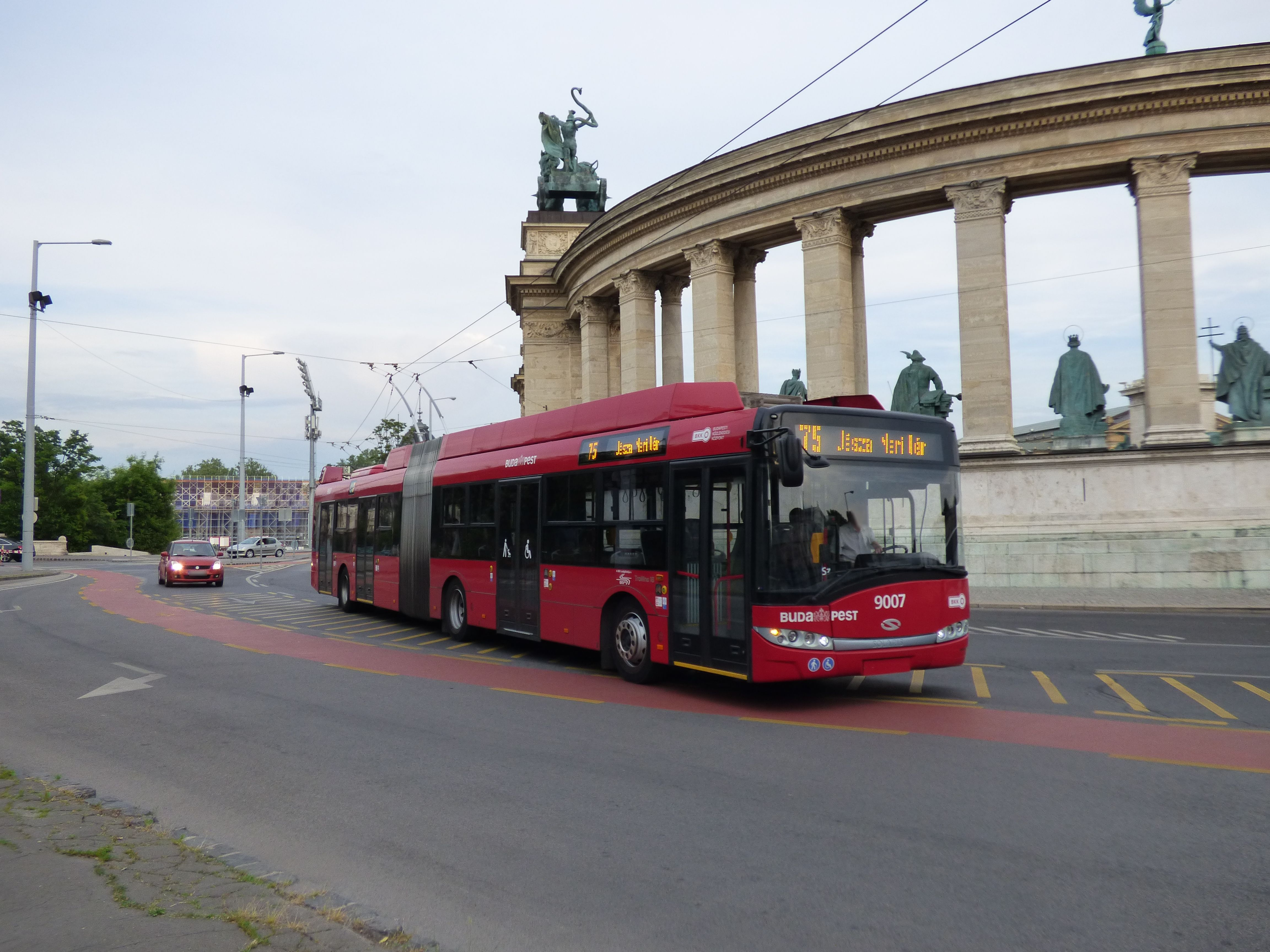
Solaris Trollino 18 of III generation

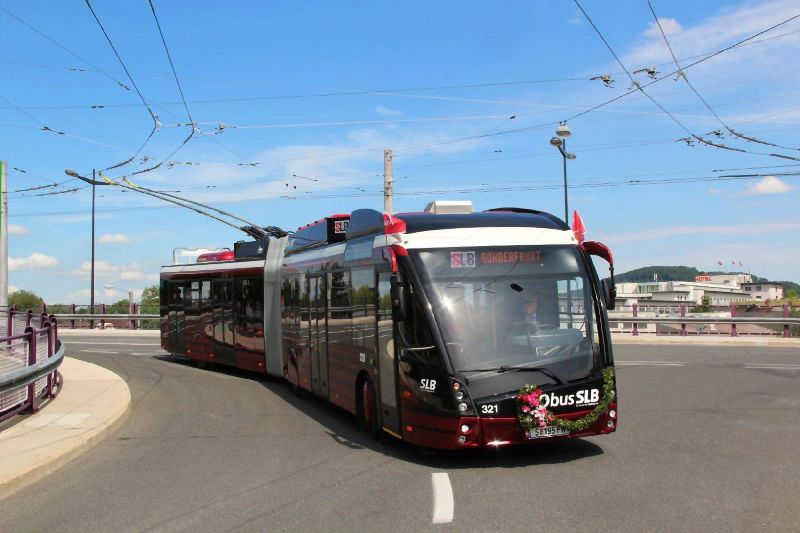
Solaris Trollino 18 MetroStyle

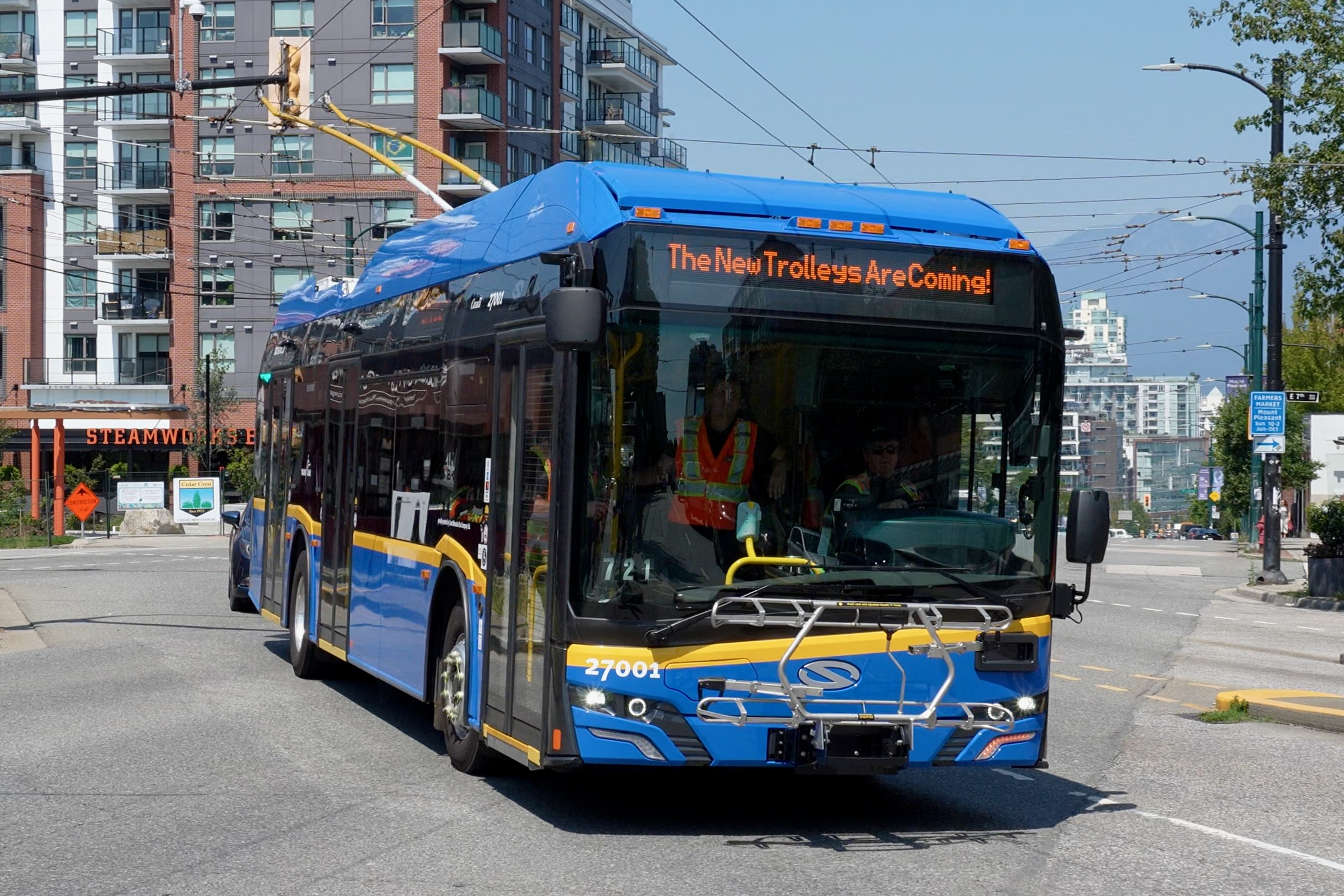
Solaris Trollino 12 of IV generation

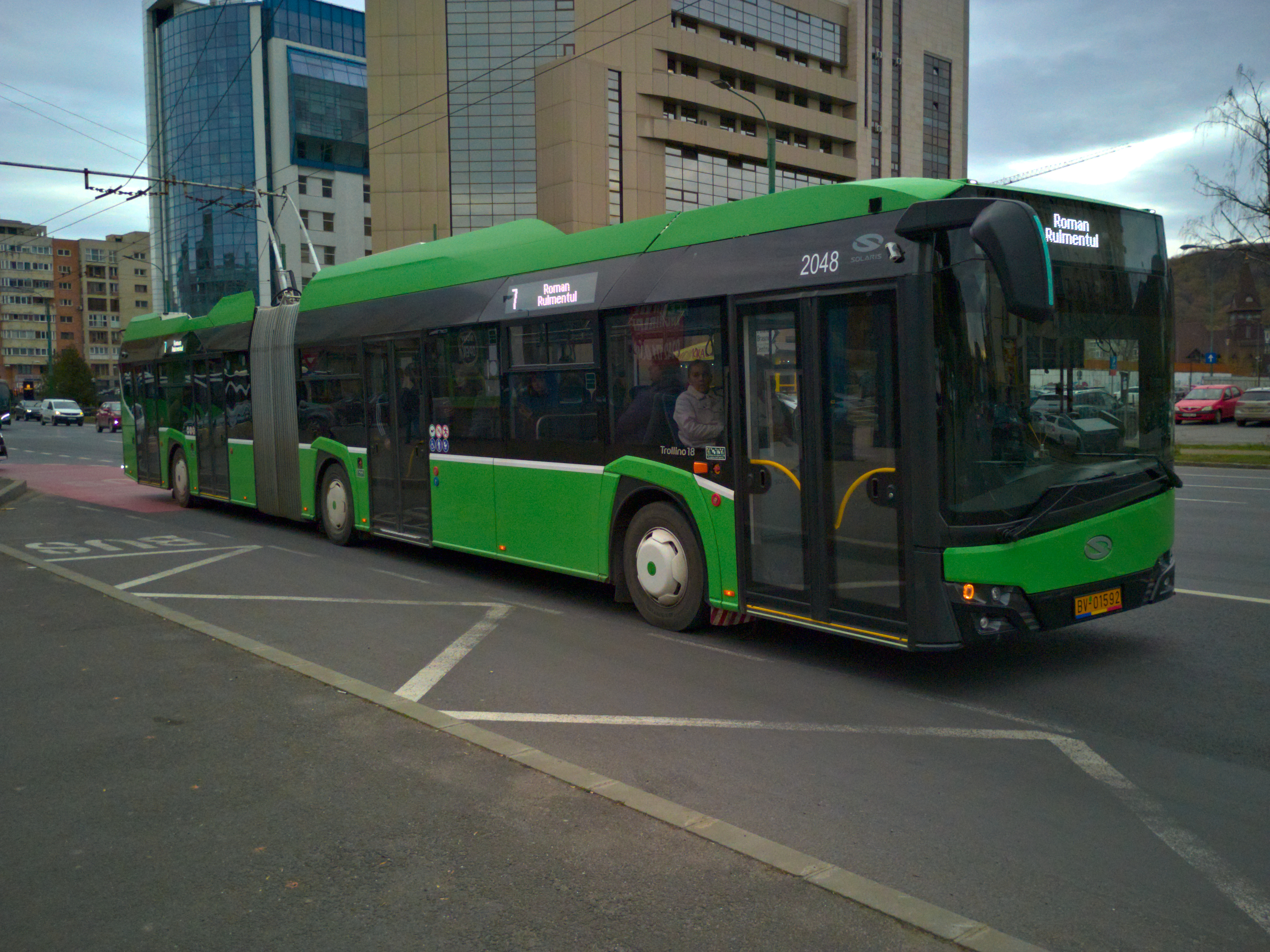
Solaris Trollino 18 of IV generation

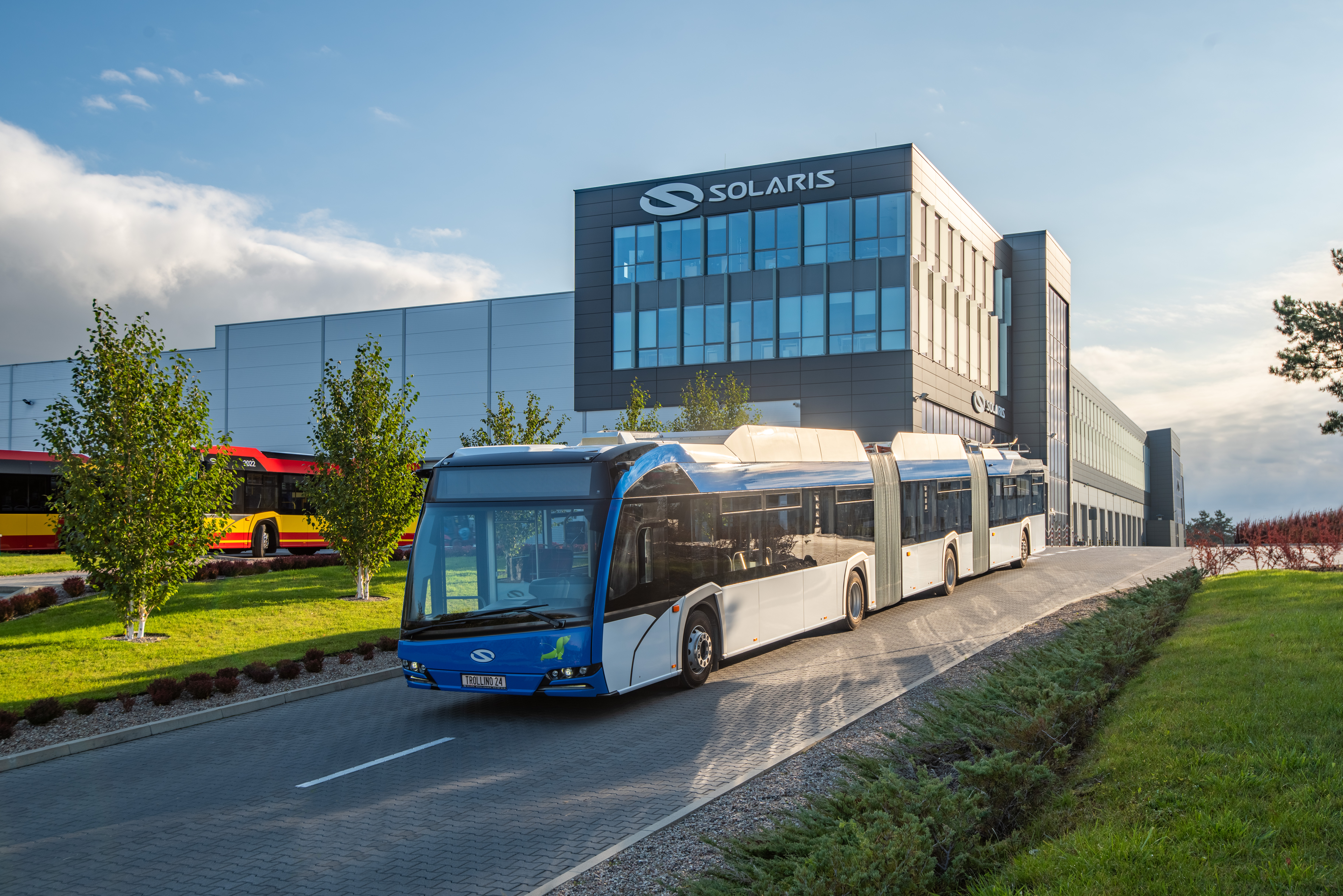
Solaris Trollino 24 MetroStyle of IV generation

=== Trams ===
In March 2006 Solaris Bus & Coach signed a contract with Bombardier Transportation and German firm Vossloh Kiepe on the assembly of trams in Poland. In 2006 these companies won a tender for the supply of 24 trams of the Bombardier NGT6/2 type for Kraków and 3 for Gdańsk. Under the cooperation agreement, Bombardier Transportation supplied the bodyworks and carriages, Vossloh Kiepe provided the electric fittings and Solaris ensured the delivery of the remaining components and the assembly of the vehicles, in collaboration with MPK Kraków. The assembly of the trams for Cracow took place in the tram depot Zajezdnia Podgórze. 2007 saw the delivery of three ordered vehicles to Gdańsk and of eight vehicles for MPK Kraków.

In mid-2009 Solaris presented the prototype of its own tram, named Solaris Tramino. Its debut took place on 14 October 2009 during the Trako trade fair in Gdańsk. Solaris scored its first commission for trams of its own design when it won a tender for the supply of 45 trams to the operator MPK in Poznań. The delivery of the vehicles started in July 2011 and ended in May 2012.

The second tender for Solaris concerned an order for 5 bi-articulated fully low-floor trams adapted to a 1000 mm track gauge, placed by Jenaer Nahverkehr – a public transport operator from the German city of Jena. The tram cars have been fitted with two driver cabins, three bogies, including four axles integrated with a 90 kW motor, and an air conditioning system for the passenger compartment. The trams were delivered in 2013. They were the first ones produced in Poland and sold to a customer in Germany. As part of the third tender in 2014, Solaris provided 18 tri-articulated trams riding on a 1100 mm track gauge to Braunschweig in Germany. These were the longest trams made by Solaris.

In August 2012 Solaris won a tender for the supply of 15 double-ended trams for the newly built tram network in Olsztyn. This vehicle has features such as traction batteries allowing for a short-distance ride without a connection to the traction line. These are also the least noise-emitting trams in Poland. The 15 vehicles were supplied in 2015.

At the beginning of February 2015 Solaris won a commission for the supply of 41 trams to the Leipzig-based public transport operator Leipziger Verkehrsbetriebe GmbH in Germany. The new trams for the Saxon buyer have been given a completely new design, in compliance with the customer's wishes. However, references to the former Tramino construction have been maintained. The longest vehicle of the family (37 630 mm) was named Tramino XL. The official première of the Tramino for Leipzig took place in February 2017, marking also the beginning of the delivery.

On 20 September 2016, at the InnoTrans trade fair in Berlin, the company announced that it had started cooperation with Stadler Rail – a Swiss rolling stock producer. The consortium won a tender for the delivery of 50 trams for public transport operator MPK S.A. from Kraków.

On 9 December 2016, Solaris announced the establishment of the joint venture Solaris Tram. The company started operation on 1 January 2017, with Zbigniew Palenica assuming the post of CEO, whereas the shares are divided between Solaris and Stadler Rail at a 40:60. In July 2017 Solaris Tram secured its first order, for the supply, to Braunschweig, of seven trams featuring a similar design as the vehicles from the previous contract.

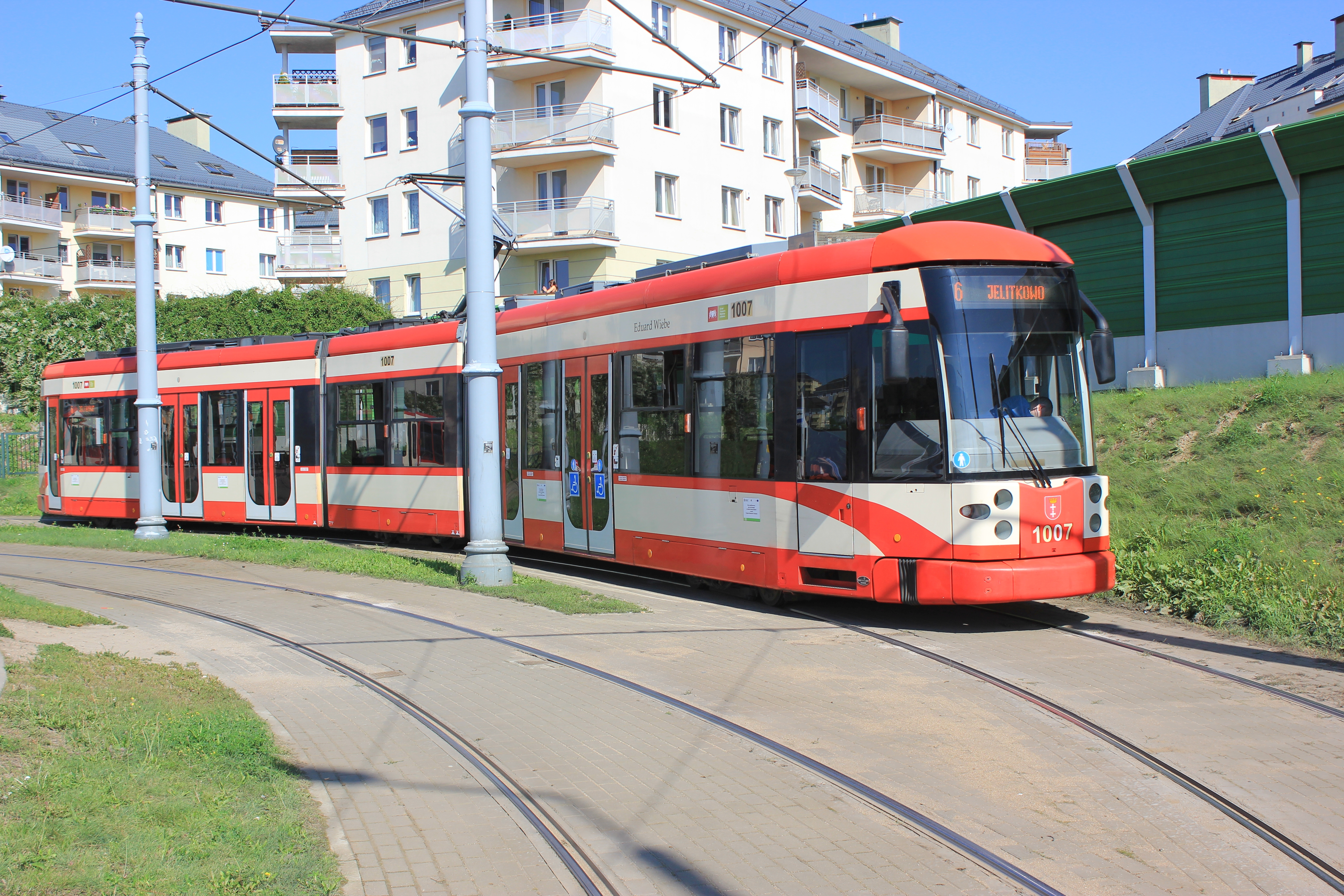
Bombardier NGT6/2 in Gdańsk

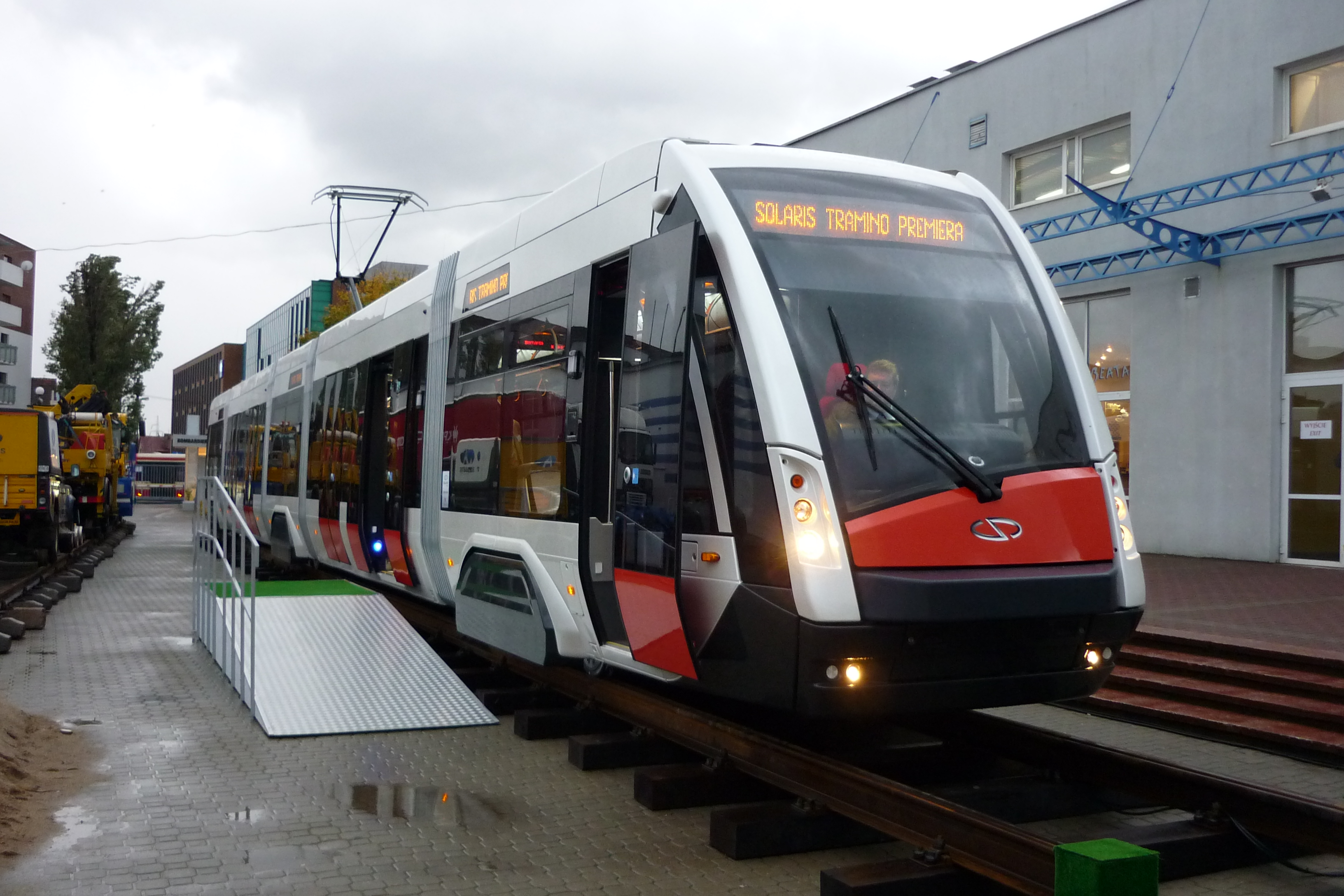
Prototype of Solaris Tramino

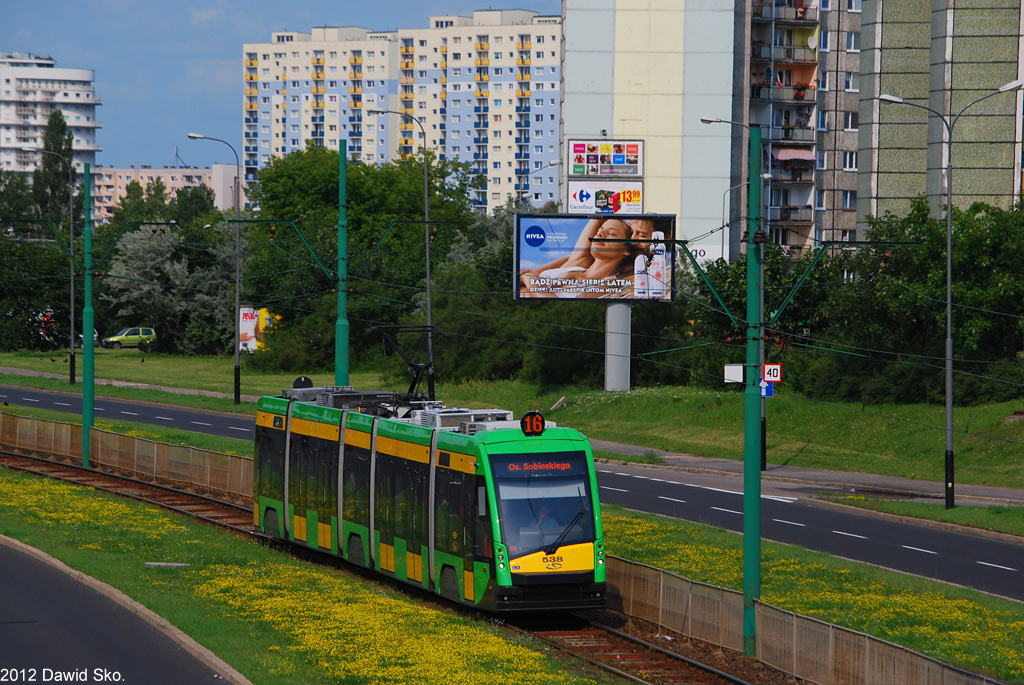
Solaris Tramino Poznań

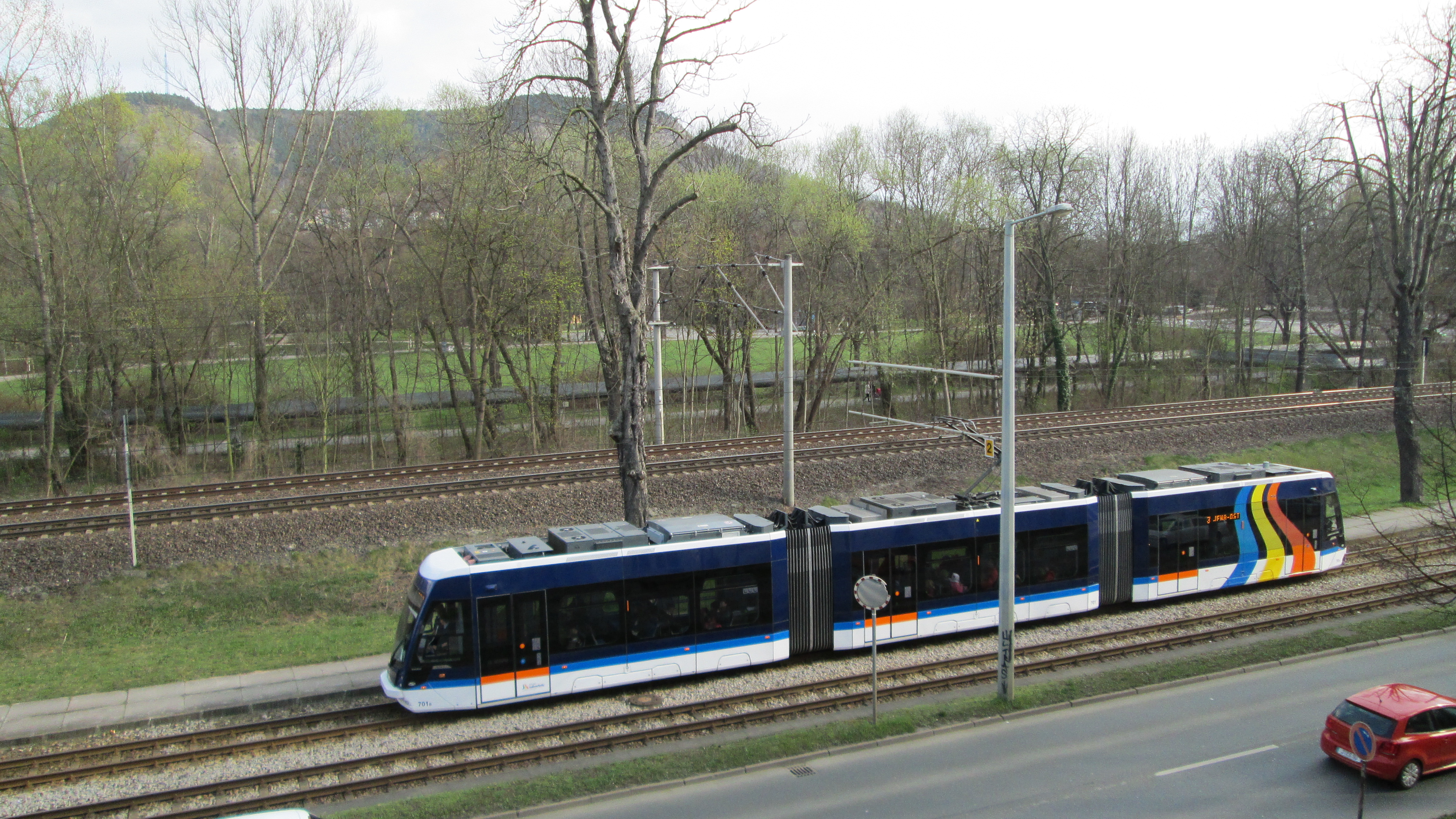
Solaris Tramino Jena

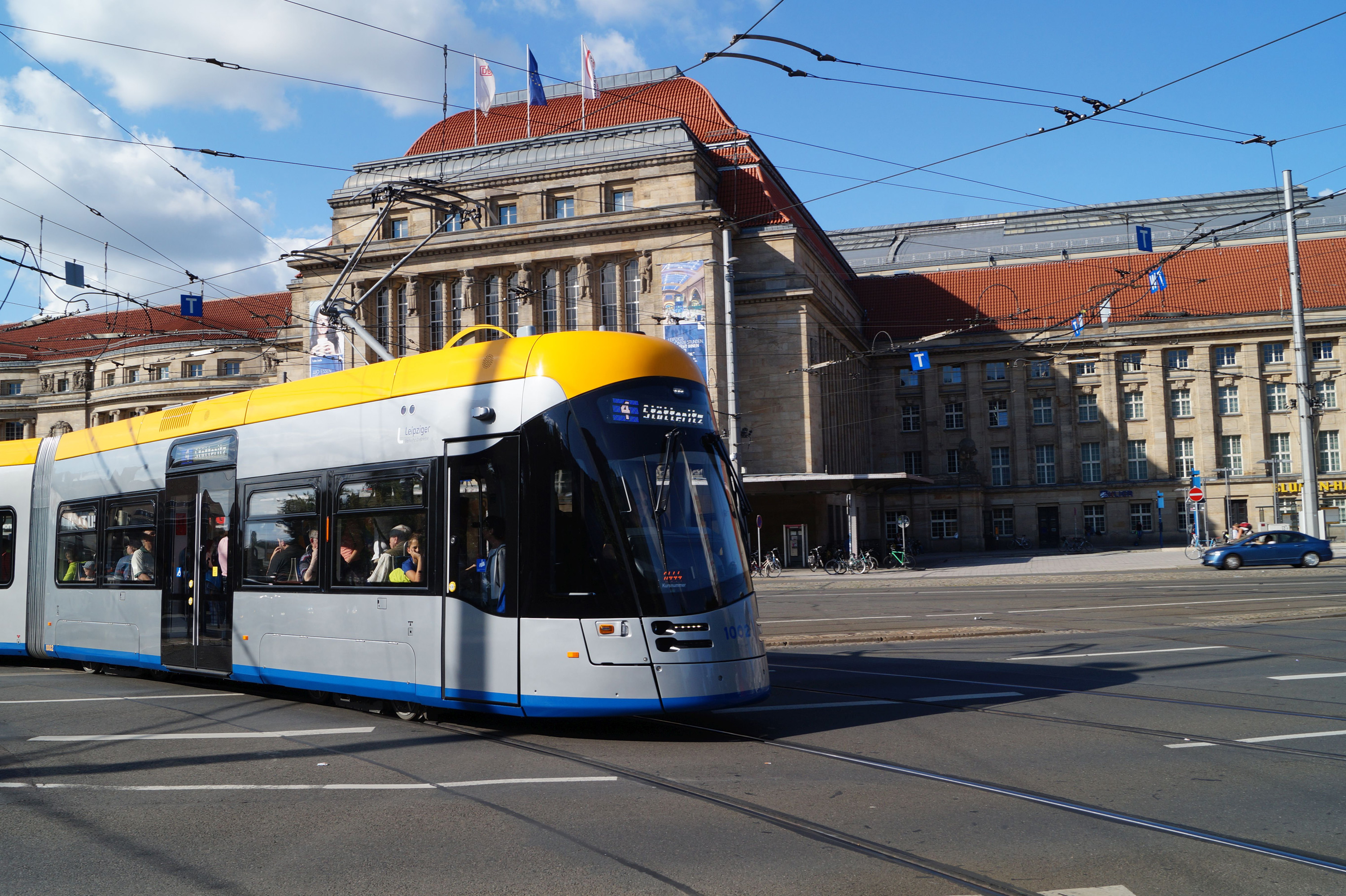
Solaris Tramino XL in Leipzig

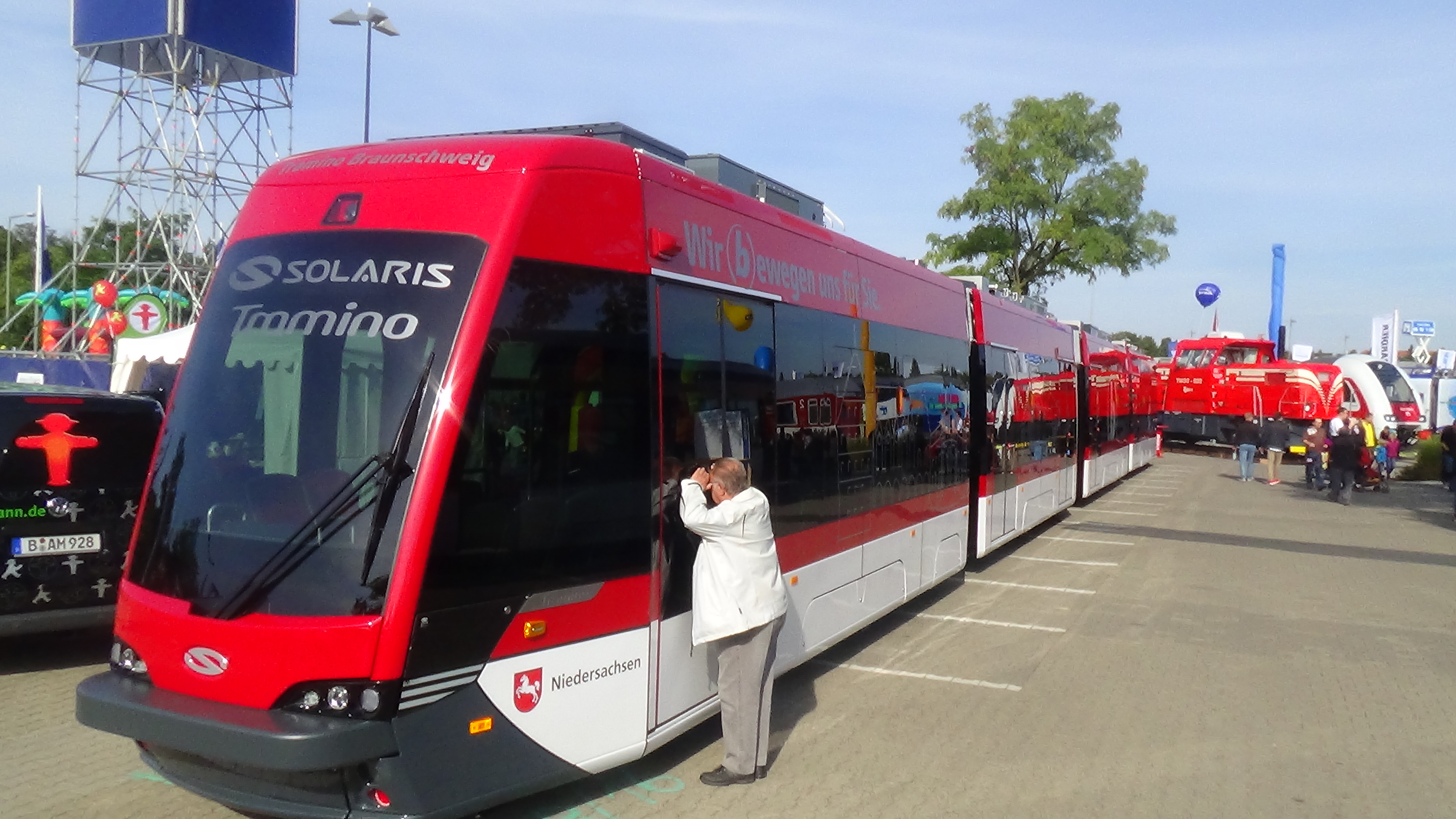
Solaris Tramino Braunschweig

== Company management and staff ==
=== Company management ===
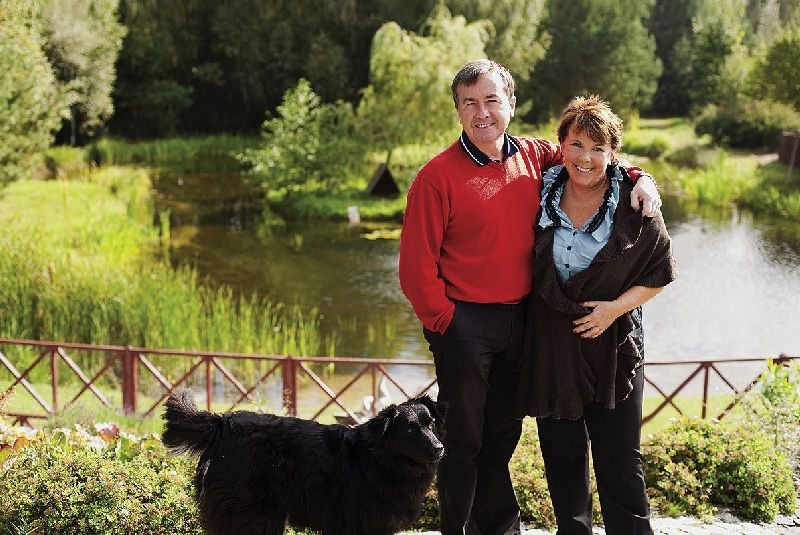
Krzysztof Olszewski and Solange Olszewska

From	Until	President and CEO	Chair of the Supervisory Board
1994	2008	Krzysztof Olszewski	–
2008	2014	Solange Olszewska	Krzysztof Olszewski
2014	2015	Solange Olszewska	Ryszard Petru
2015	2016	Andreas Strecker	Janusz Reiter
2016	2018	Solange Olszewska	Janusz Reiter
2018	2022	Javier Calleja	Josu Imaz
2023		Javier Iriarte	Javier Martínez Ojinaga

Source:.

=== Number of employees ===
In the first year of operation there were 36 employees working in the production hall. In the following years, as new production halls were launched and production expanded, the staff number kept growing. In 2005 Solaris reported a headcount of 1000. As of 2022 Solaris employs 2700 people in Poland and in foreign agencies.

== Commercial symbols ==
=== Logo ===
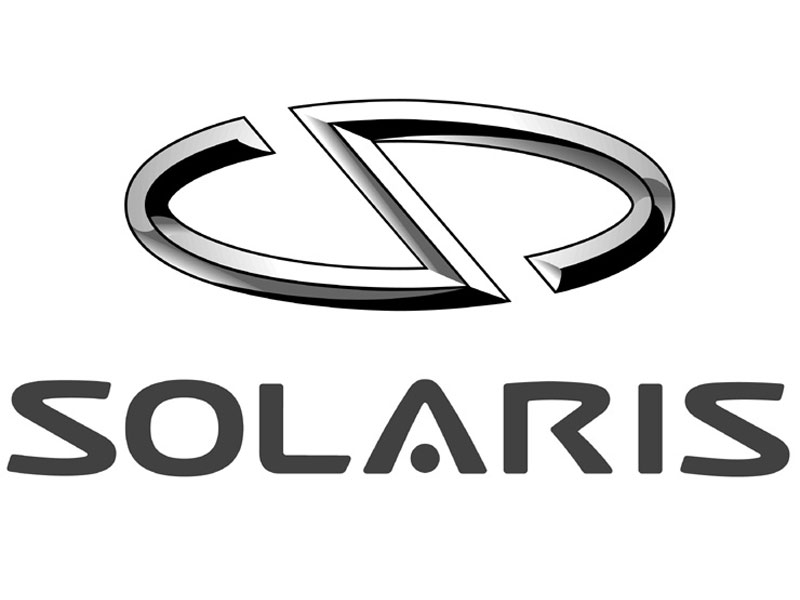
Solaris logo (2005-2012)

Initially, Solaris did not have its own logo – it relied on the symbol of holding company Neoplan. The first logotype of Solaris was presented in 2001, when Solaris Bus & Coach Sp. z o.o. was officially established. It featured a stylised inscription reading Solaris, enclosed in an ellipse. Moreover, for buses the company used a complex logo on a black background, where the letter O was replaced by a planet, whereas the letter A was set against a star in the backdrop. In 2005 a new graphic system for Solaris was shown. The company introduced the characteristic logotype resembling the letter S. In 2012 the company launched an overhauled version of the symbol making it bolder and changing the interior filling of the letter S. What is more, the stylised name Solaris, in line with the design from 2001, is placed underneath the graphic symbol.

=== Advertising slogan ===
In 2005 Solaris introduced its first advertising slogan: “Power of Enthusiasm”. It was in use until 2017, when the company replaced it with the slogan “Wspólny kierunek” (Polish for Common direction).

=== Green dachshund ===
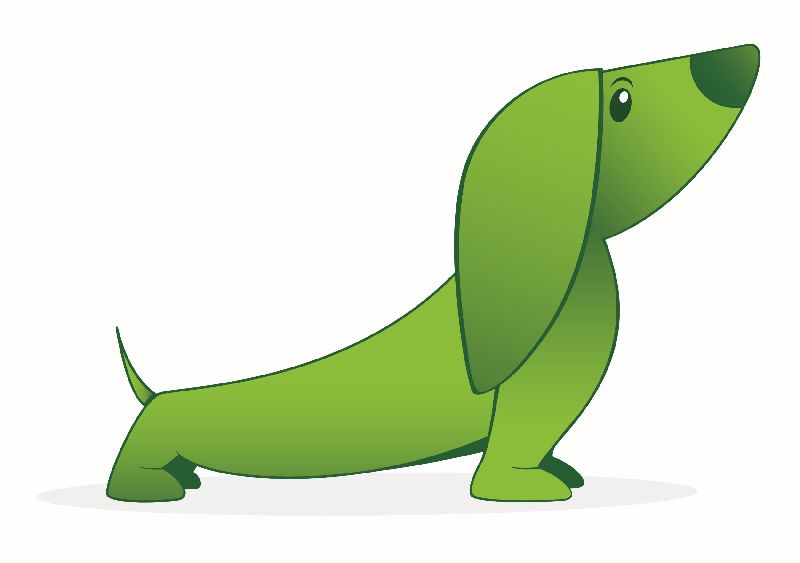
Green dachshund on vehicles with diesel and natural gas engines

The green dachshund (zielony jamnik) is the mascot of the company Solaris. It used to be attached to Neoplan Polska buses, distinguishing them from vehicles produced in other Neoplan factories. It was created by the company's vice-president of the day, Solange Olszewska. The dachshund resembles a low-floor bus in shape, but it also symbolises the loyalty towards customers and low operating costs. The green colour is a symbol of concern for the natural environment. Its image is glued to the outside of the bus, usually on the front face, on the left side of the vehicle (when looking in the travel direction). A plush toy version of the symbol is often handed out during official release of buses to customers. In the case of the first and second generation and for some third-generation vehicles, the logo included the word “low-floor” written in the language of the country in question (e.g. “Niederflur” for Germany, “Нископодов” for Bulgaria or “niskopodłogowy” for Poland). In the case of low-entry buses, the inscription was changed accordingly to “low-entry”. Standard buses of the Urbino family (with diesel or natural gas engines) feature a dachshund logo in the basic form, whereas other drive or construction types have their distinguishing feature represented in the image of the dachshund, as shown in the table below:

Vehicle model and version	Operating differences reflected in the vehicle symbol
Solaris Urbino electric	The graphic symbol includes a cable and plug-in replacing the tail, which symbolises the electric drive.
Urbino hybrid	The graphic symbol contains two hearts which represent the double drive system of the vehicle.
Urbino Low Entry	The dachshund stands with its front paw raised. In the older version the dachshund's front paws are seen lying flat, whereas the hind leg was seen standing, which results in the belly rising in the rear, just like the floor is raised in the rear of the vehicle.
Urbino in Cracow	The dachshund wears a peaked cap, typical for the region and known in Polish as a krakuska, on its head. It appears only on some of the buses delivered to the city.
Trollino	The dachshund has a leash resembling trolley poles tied to its collar.
Tramino	The graphic symbol includes a leash and yellow inline skates.
InterUrbino	The graphic symbol carries a backpack.

The green dachshund is also used as the logo of the company's charitable foundation Fundacja Zielony Jamnik, established in 2012.

== Products ==
- Current models
  Type	Start of production
  City buses
  Solaris Urbino 9 LE electric	2011
  Solaris Urbino 10,5	2017
  Solaris Urbino 12	1999
  Solaris Urbino 12 CNG	2005
  Solaris Urbino 12 hybrid	2010
  Solaris Urbino 12 mild-hybrid	2020
  Solaris Urbino 12 electric	2013
  Solaris Urbino 12 hydrogen	2019
  Solaris Urbino 18	1999
  Solaris Urbino 18 CNG	2006
  Solaris Urbino 18 hybrid	2006
  Solaris Urbino 18 mild-hybrid	2020
  Solaris Urbino 18 electric	2014
  Solaris Urbino 18 hydrogen	2022
  Solaris Urbino 18,75 electric	2014
  Solaris Urbino 24 electric MetroStyle	2022
  Local and intercity buses
  Solaris Urbino 12 LE	2004
  Solaris Urbino 15 LE electric	2020
  Solaris InterUrbino 12	2009
  Solaris InterUrbino 12,8	2012
  Trolleybuses
  Solaris Trollino 12	2001
  Solaris Trollino 18	2002
  Solaris Trollino 24	2019
  Škoda 26Tr Solaris	2009
  Škoda 28Tr Solaris	2009
- Historical models
  Type	Start of production	End of production
  City buses
  Solaris Alpino 8,6	2007	2018
  Solaris Urbino 8,9 LE electric	2011	2021
  Solaris Urbino 9	2000	2002
  Solaris Urbino 10	2002	2018
  Solaris Urbino 12,9	2013	2018
  Solaris Urbino 12,9 hybrid	2013	2018
  Solaris Urbino 15	1999	2018
  Solaris Urbino 15 CNG	2004	2018
  Solaris Urbino 18,75	2014	2018
  Local and intercity buses
  Solaris Valletta	2002	2007
  Solaris Urbino 8,9 LE	2008	2021
  Solaris Urbino 12 LE CNG	2007	2018
  Solaris Urbino 15 LE	2008	2018
  Solaris Urbino 15 LE CNG	2008	2018
  Coaches
  Solaris Vacanza 12	2002	2014
  Solaris Vacanza 13	2003	2014
  Trolleybuses
  Solaris Trollino 15	2003	2018
  Škoda 27Tr Solaris	2009	2018
  Trams
  Bombardier NGT6/2	2007	2008
  Solaris Tramino	2009	2018

Special vehicles and prototypes
Type	Years of production
Special vehicles
Blood donation vehicles	since 2002
Airport buses	since 2004
Cinebus	2016
Prototypes
Solaris Urbino 18 LE CNG	2011
Solaris Urbino 10,9 LE	2013, 2015
Solaris Concept Bus	2015
Solaris Urbino 12 LE lite hybrid	2018

== Production and sales ==
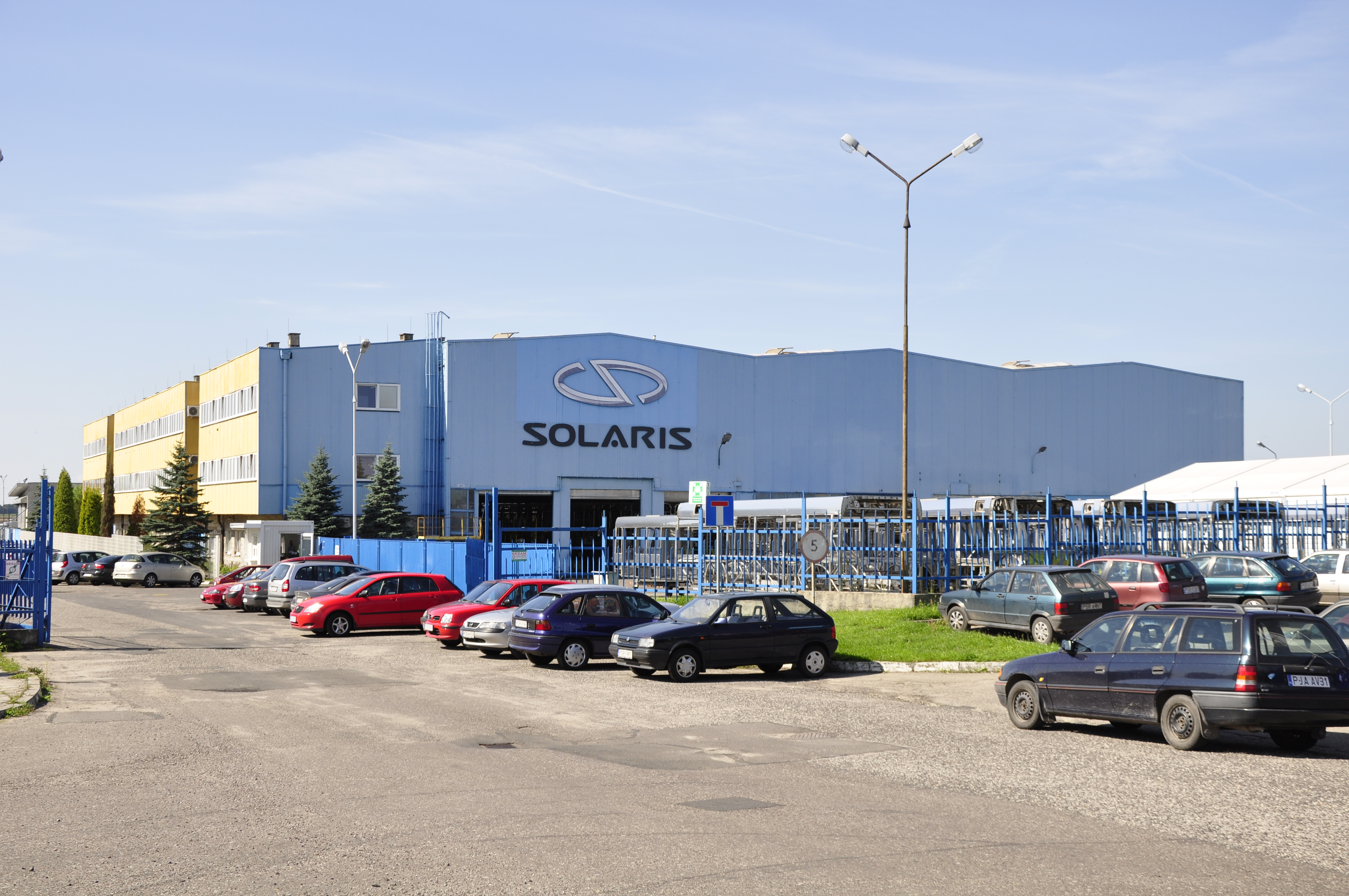
Solaris factory in Środa Wielkopolska

Year	Buses, coaches and trolleybuses			Trams	
Year	Sales	Export	Export (%)	Solaris Tramino	Bombardier NGT6/2
1996	56	–	–		
1997	163	–	–		
1998	160	–	–		
1999	106	–	–		
2000	178	7	3%		
2001	249	54	21%		
2002	230	124	54%		
2003	264	169	64%		
2004	478	366	77%		
2005	598	487	81%		
2006	567	367	65%		
2007	681	400	59%		11
2008	1039	557	54%		16
2009	1115	852	76%	1	
2010	1120	713	64%		
2011	1207	687	57%	23	
2012	1006	743	74%	22	
2013	1302	1010	77%	5	
2014	1380	1100	80%	3	
2015	1279	946	74%	15	
2016	1300	829	64%	13	
2017	1397	952	68%	7	
2018	1226	824	67%		
2019	1487	1053	71%		
2020	1560	1195	77%		
2021	1492	1099	74%		
2022	1492	1245	83%		
Σ	23,132	15,779	68%	89	27

Solaris buses have found buyers in over 700 cities in 34 countries in Europe, Africa and Asia (as of 2022). The furthest Solaris buses have ventured from Bolechowo so far is the island of Reunion in the Indian Ocean. Solaris has been the sales leader in Poland of new city buses with a DMC of more than 8t since 2003, without interruption. The number of buses, trolleybuses and trams sold by Solaris was greatest for Poland (5528), Germany (2960), the Czech Republic (860), Italy (829), Sweden (616), France (523) and Norway (478).

=== Production facilities ===
The production of Solaris vehicles is handled in four production facilities situated in the vicinity of Poznań and in the city itself. The headquarters is located in Bolechowo-Osiedle. That is also where the final stage of production takes place. Furthermore, Solaris operates two plants in Środa Wielkopolska and one in Poznań. According to company plans, within the framework of the joint-venture of Solaris and Stadler Rail, as of 2019 the final assembly of Solaris Tramino trams is to be executed in the Stadler Polska plants located in Siedlce. In 2017 Solaris launched yet another plant – the Solaris Logistics Center – located in Jasin near Poznań. The new distribution centre and spare part warehouse was to streamline the order implementation process and raising the level of after-sales customer care.

==== Bolechowo-Osiedle ====
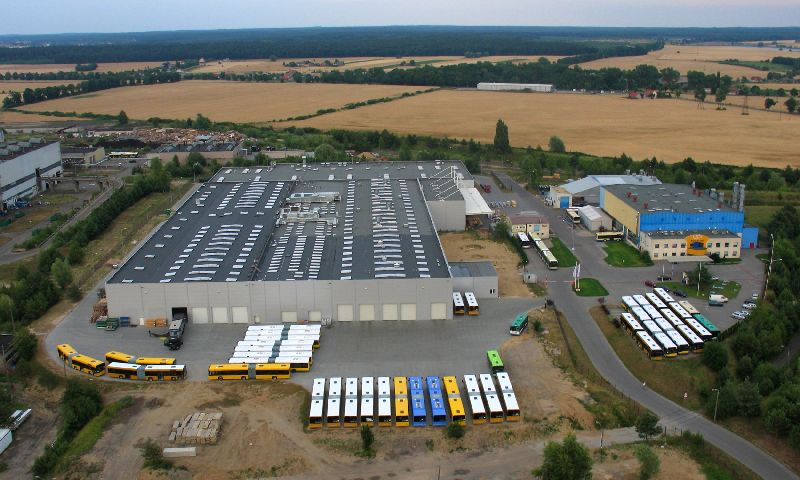
Bolechowo-Osiedle factory

The factory in Bolechowo-Osiedle is the biggest production facility of Solaris. That is where the final stage of bus production takes place. Opened in 1996, it is Solaris' oldest factory, created for the execution of an order for buses for MPK Poznań. In 2014 the company started expanding the factory, adding additional production and office space. The following extension of that facility began in 2018. Annual output amounts to 1300–1400 vehicles, meaning that every day 5 to 8 new buses roll off the assembly line in Bolechowo. The average production time for one city bus is approximately 20 working days. Offices are located next to the production hall, constituting the headquarters of Solaris Bus & Coach. Since 2016, it is possible to sneak a peek at the interior of the factory and the office building in Bolechowo using Google Street View.

==== Środa Wielkopolska ====
The facility in Środa Wielkopolska specialises in the production of steel bodyframes for buses and rolling stock. Solaris bought the factory in 1998, following the bankruptcy of the former owner, TRAMAD. The facility in Środa Wielkopolska employs about 360 people. About 8 bodyframes are completed here every day. In 2018, the company started the concurrent extension of the steel structure plant in Środa Wielkopolska and the plant in Bolechowo.

The second production hall in Środa Wielkopolska was launched in 2009, to serve the needs of orders for Solaris Tramino trams for the public transport operator MPK Poznań. Specialising in tram bodyframes, this particular facility caters only for the production of Tramino trams.

==== Poznań ====
The factory in Poznań at Wieruszewska street is a facility focusing on the production of rolling stock, where the final assembly of Solaris Tramino trams takes place. Just like the plant in Środa Wielkopolska, this facility was built to handle orders placed by MPK Poznań. Earlier prototype models of trams were manufactured in the production halls of external firms.

=== Biggest orders ===
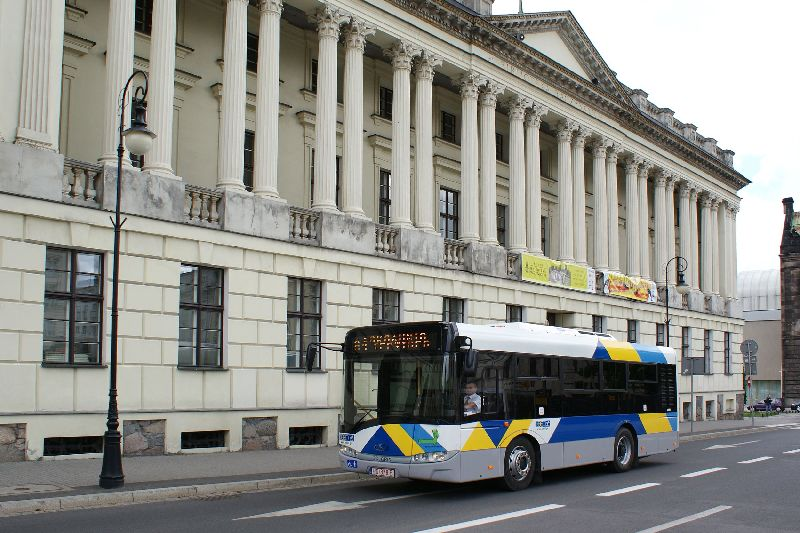
Solaris Alpino in E.THE.L Athens design in Poznań

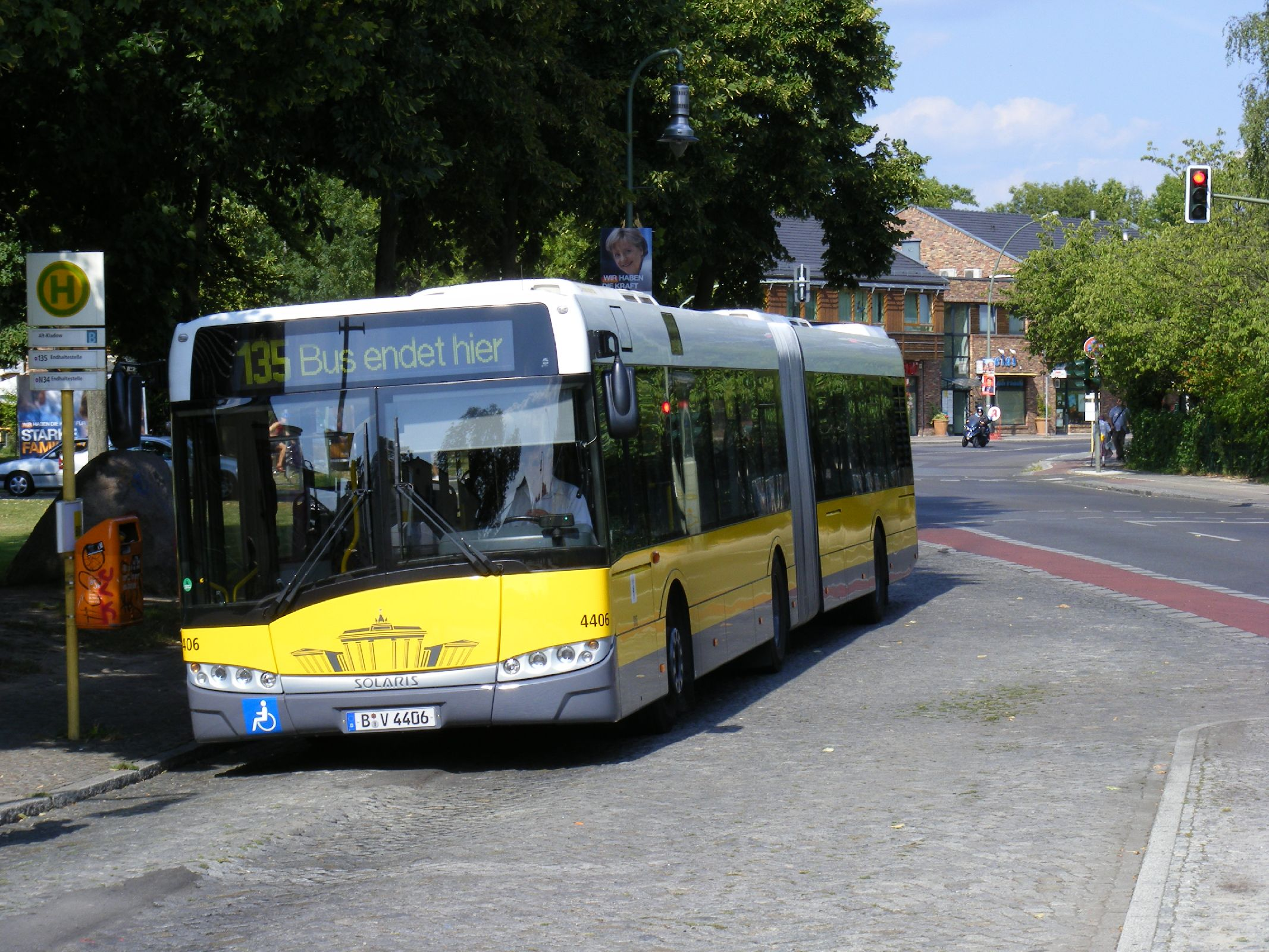
Solaris Urbino 18 in Berlin

==== E.THE.L Athens ====
At the beginning of 2008, the municipal bus operator from Athens, E..THE.L, issued an invitation to tender for 320 city buses – namely 220 MIDI-class and 100 MAXI-class vehicles. Solaris’ bid was singled out from among others, and in July 2008, the company signed a contract for the supply of 100 Urbino 18 and 220 Alpino 8,6 buses. The contract value exceeded EUR 80 million. The deliveries were completed by the end of 2009.

==== Cotral Lazio ====
At the beginning of 2016, Solaris won a contract for the delivery of 300 suburban buses for the operator Cotral from the Italian region of Lazio. This contract was worth nearly EUR 110 million. Under this contract, Solaris supplied 12-metre buses of the Solaris InterUrbino category. The buses were provided with, among others, baggage holds, air-conditioning and rear-view reversing cameras. The drive consists of a diesel engine made by DAF.

==== BVG Berlin ====
In 2004 Solaris secured an order from Berliner Verkehrsbetriebe for the supply of 260 city buses of the MEGA class (130 + 130 under a contractual option). Following this contract, there are now 260 low-floor Solaris Urbino 18 buses of the third generation driving on the streets of Berlin. They joined 10 older Urbino 18 buses of the previous generation, already in use in the city.

==== RTA Dubai ====
Towards the end of 2006 the Dubai Roads & Transport Authority (the municipal transport operator in Dubai) put out a tender for the supply of a total of 620 city buses, although the order was divided into several batches. One of these batches, covering 225 vehicles, was won by Solaris. The contract entailed the delivery of 150 articulated Urbino 18 buses and 75 Urbino 12 buses of the third generation. The deliveries of buses were spread in time, from the end of 2007 and over the first half of 2008. One novel feature applied in the buses for the Dubai RTA was a more efficient air-conditioning system and systems protecting the engine from sandstorms. Special curtains of cool air have been applied in the buses, too, to prevent heat from entering the bus through open doors.

==== SWRT Wallonia ====
Société Régionale Wallonne du Transport (regional carrier of the Belgian region of Wallonia) ordered 208 hybrid buses from Solaris in 2017. Under the EUR 105 million commission, the producer supplied Solaris Urbino 12 Hybrid buses of the 4 generation. The deliveries were spread over a period of two years – 97 buses were supplied in 2017 and another 111 were shipped over in 2018.

==== MZA Warsaw ====
In March 2019, Solaris won the tender organized by MZA Warsaw, for the delivery of 130 electric buses. The contract was signed on July 22, 2019. The vehicles will take to the streets of Warsaw in 2019 and 2020. The contract is worth PLN 399.5 million (roughly 89.5 million euro) and was the largest electric bus order to date in Europe. Solaris submitted the only tender.

==== ATM Milan ====
In July 2019, Solaris won an order for the supply of 250 electric buses with a length of 12m for a carrier from Milan, winning the bid against Mercedes. It was a tender for electric buses worth up to EUR 192 million.

== See also ==
- Autosan
- Electric bus
- Electric vehicle conversion
- Hispano Carrocera
