= Scania OmniCity =

Low-floor Scania city bus on integral chassis

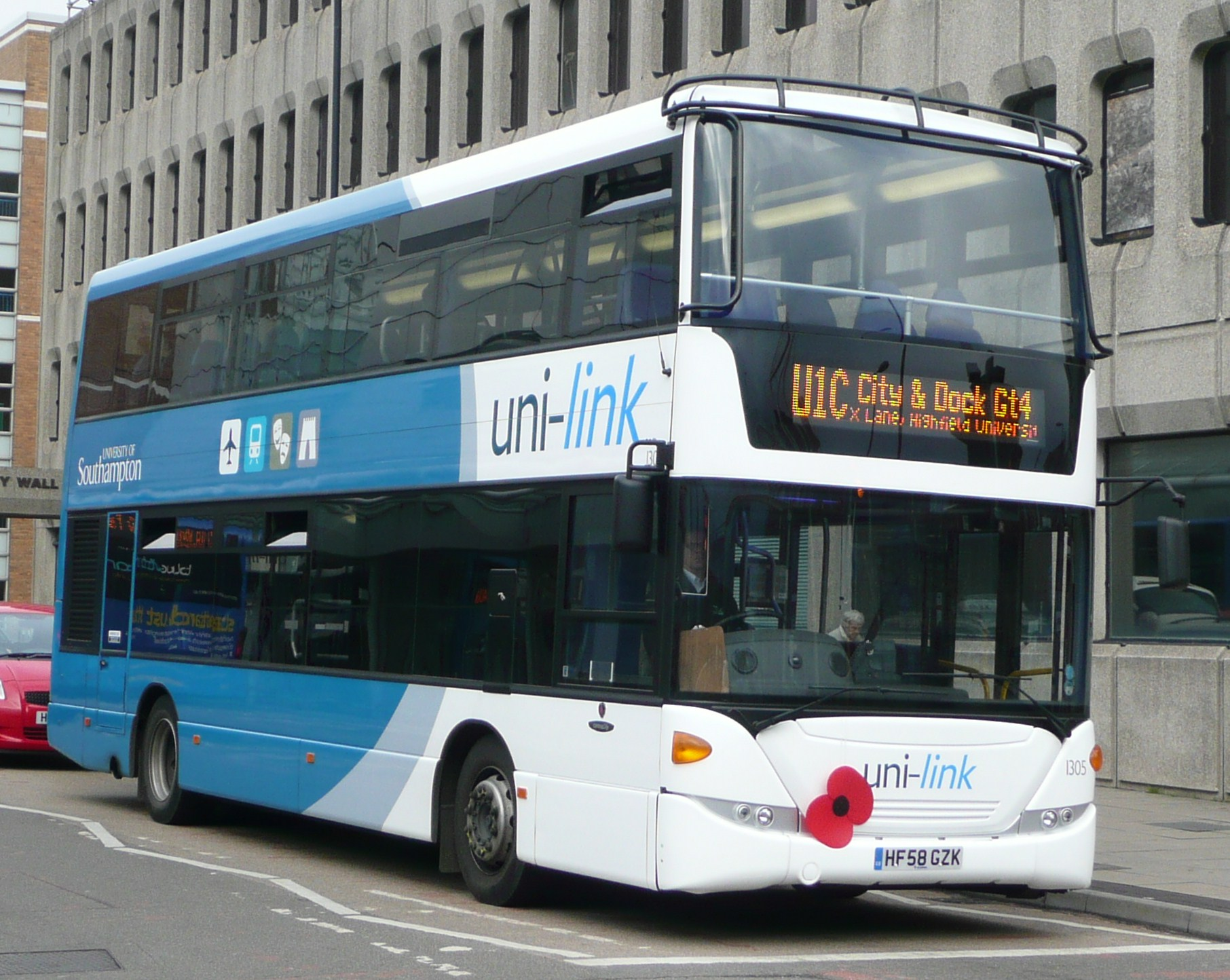
- An N-series OmniCity double-decker bus in use with Unilink.

Overview
- Manufacturer: Scania
- Production: 1996–2012 (Europe); 2002-2011 (UK, Single Decker); 2005-2012 (UK, Double Decker)
- Assembly: Silkeborg, Denmark (DAB); Katrineholm, Sweden; Słupsk, Poland

Body and chassis
- Class: Complete bus
- Body style: Single-decker/double-decker city bus
- Layout: Transverse rear-engine design
- Doors: 1, 2, 3 or 4
- Floor type: Low floor
- Related: Scania OmniLink

Powertrain
- Engine: Euro II (4-series); 9.0 L DSC9 I6 (diesel); 9.0 L DSI9 I6 (ED95); 9.0 L OSC9 I6 (CNG); Euro III; 9.0 L DC9 I6 (diesel); 9.0 L DSI9 I6 (ED95); 9.0 L OC9 I6 (CNG); Euro IV (N-series); 8.9 L DC9 I5 (diesel); 9.0 L DSI9 I6 (ED95); 9.0 L OC9 I6 (CNG); Euro V/EEV; 9.3 L DC9 I5 (diesel); 9.3 L DC9 E02 I5 (ED95); 9.3 L OC9 I5 (CNG)
- Power output: 250–310 hp
- Transmission: ZF

Dimensions
- Length: 10000mm, 10600mm, 10900mm, 11950mm, 12200mm, 18100mm
- Width: 2500mm
- Height: 3000mm, 4200mm and 4380mm

Chronology
- Successor: Scania Citywide LF; Scania Fencer

The Scania OmniCity is an integrally constructed vertically-engined low floor city bus that was available from Scania on the European market between 1996 (across Europe)/1997 and 2012.

The OmniCity was introduced in September 1996 as the first product based on the 4-series bus range. The first prototypes were built in the former DAB plant in Silkeborg, Denmark, and serial production continued there in 1997, joined by Scania's plant in Katrineholm, Sweden. From 1999 it was also built at the plant in Słupsk, Poland. Production in Silkeborg ended in early 2000, and Katrineholm in 2004, with only a few test buses in 2005 to 2006. Since then all have been built in Poland.

In 2006, the OmniCity was upgraded from the 4-series to the new N-series, which also included a thorough facelift, with the large rectangular front headlamps being replaced by smaller, round items, and further tweaks carried out to the rear styling.

The Scania Citywide was launched in 2011 as a replacement for the OmniCity, except for the right-hand drive markets, where Scania have chosen to rely on external bodywork manufacturers, including Alexander Dennis. With a total of more than 2200 units for the United Kingdom, the last few OmniCities were built in 2012.

== Europe ==
The single-decker rigid and articulated Scania OmniCity were popular in continental Europe.

Omnicities were popular in most of the Nordic countries. In Norway, Omnicities were delivered to operator Norgesbuss AS in 2006 for service in the capital Oslo. Some of these would later be sold on for further use in the Polish city of Koszalin in 2015. Omnicities were also sold to Concordia Bus in Norway, Linjebuss in Sweden, the Helsinki Public Transport Authority and to Strætó bs in Reykjavík. OmniCities were also sold to the Estonian cities of Tallinn and Tartu.

OmniCities were also popular in many regions of Poland. 108 rigid OmniCities were delivered to Warsaw operator PKS between 2007 and 2008. Two buses replacing accident-damaged models were also delivered to PKS in 2011. In Kraków, 15 articulated OmniCities were delivered from 2001 to 2003, while OmniCities also entered service in the cities of Koszalin, Konin, Grudziądz and Słupsk, where a batch of OmniCities running on ethanol fuel were delivered in 2007.

In France, Parisian municipal operator RATP ordered over 300 OmniCities from 2006 to 2010 in both rigid 12m and articulated 18m lengths, the latter of which were operated on 'Orlybus' express services to Orly Airport. 50 Omnicities were also ordered in 2003 for service in Amiens, while fleets of OmniCities were sold to operators in Angers and Calais. OmniCities were sold to Italian operators in Milan, Genoa, Bergamo and Venice, while in Spain, Valencian operator EMT purchased a total of 81 rigid Omnicities from 2000 to 2004.

== United Kingdom ==
=== Single-decker ===
The single-decker OmniCity was first introduced in 2002 in right-hand drive for the United Kingdom market.

The earlier version of the single-decker OmniCity was known as the CN94UB. The Euro IV version was known as the CN230UB or CN270UB, the 230 and 270 indicate the maximum power (in hp) of the engine.

The Scania OmniCity single-decker has a rounded roof dome with a single-curvature windscreen and a separate destination display. Unlike the Scania L94UB and OmniLink, the OmniCity features a full low floor without the need for steps or ramps to reach the rear seats, similar to the Volvo B7L.

The Go-Ahead Group were the most popular customer of the rigid single-decker OmniCity, purchasing a total of 132 of the type, seventy of these going to Metrobus of Crawley for both its London and south-east England operations. Additional operators of rigid single-decker OmniCities included 78 with Menzies Aviation, 42 with the FirstGroup, 48 with both Arriva UK Bus and Nottingham City Transport, and 24 with Cardiff Bus. Newport Bus, a popular operator of Scania buses, purchased 38 single-deckers throughout the OmniCity's UK production run, buying no more Scania products after production ended in 2011.

=== Double-decker ===
In September 2004, Scania announced the introduction of the OmniCity 2-axle double-decker bus to complement its OmniDekka double-decker bus sold in the United Kingdom, with the first examples entering production at Scania's Słupsk factory in January 2005. The 9 metres (30 ft) OmniCity double-decker is built to full low-floor configuration and is a complete Scania integral product on the N94UD chassis, unlike the OmniDekka, which features a body by East Lancashire Coachbuilders on the same chassis.

An N94UD OmniCity demonstrator was delivered to Travel West Midlands in November 2005, with five more OmniCitys on Scania N230UD chassis subsequently following. The first production order was made by Lothian Buses of Edinburgh, who took delivery of five N230UD OmniCitys during 2006 for the 'Airlink' express network. Lothian Buses subsequently ordered a further 10 buses to replace the Dennis Tridents on the network; these buses entered service in late 2007.

Initially, the OmniCity double-decker was in limited production until the Euro IV version was launched. The reason for this was that the new Euro IV Scania engine was a five-cylinder 9-litre EGR engine as opposed to its Euro III predecessor, which was a six-cylinder 9-litre engine. The chassis designation had also changed to N230UD or N270UD.

462 double-decker OmniCities were produced for London's bus operators, with London United and London Sovereign, then owned by Transdev, purchasing 206 OmniCities, while the East London Bus Group, the former operations of Stagecoach London owned by Macquarie Bank, purchased 174 OmniCities. London United donated their first double-decker OmniCity to the London Bus Museum in February 2022. Outside of London, many Go-Ahead companies purchased OmniCities, with Bluestar, Southern Vectis and Wilts & Dorset purchasing 61 as part of Go South Coast. 33 OmniCities were also purchased by Metrobus and Brighton & Hove.

=== Articulated version ===
The single-decker articulated (or "bendy bus") version of the OmniCity was first introduced in 1996. The articulated OmniCity built by 2006 was known as the CN94UA.

In the United Kingdom, a demonstrator toured London between 2004 and 2005, but failed to win any orders in place of the Mercedes-Benz Citaro. After other trials around the country, this bus was bought by Lothian Buses in April 2008, and then acquired by Nottingham City Transport after it left Lothian Buses in late August 2009. In 2005, Travel West Midlands ordered a batch of eleven articulated OmniCities, while First Greater Manchester placed eighteen in service, predominantly on services between Manchester and Bury. A batch of nineteen of high-specification artics also entered service with Cardiff Bus in 2006 on the high-profile 'Baycar' network.

The Euro IV/V/EEV articulated version of the OmniCity was known as the CN280UA. In the United Kingdom, eleven were purchased by Menzies Aviation for use on shuttle services around Heathrow Airport, after purchasing ten on the previous chassis.

== Gallery ==
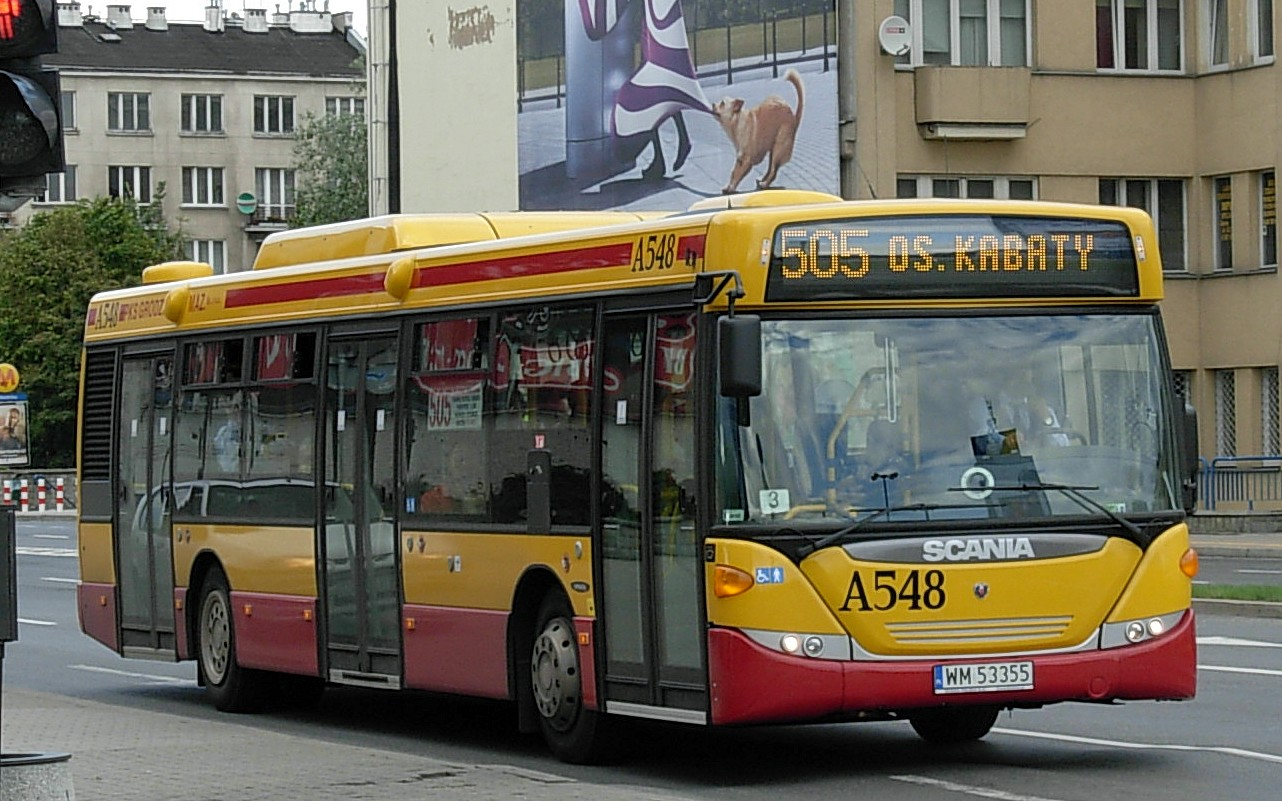
PKS Scania OmniCity in Warsaw, 2007

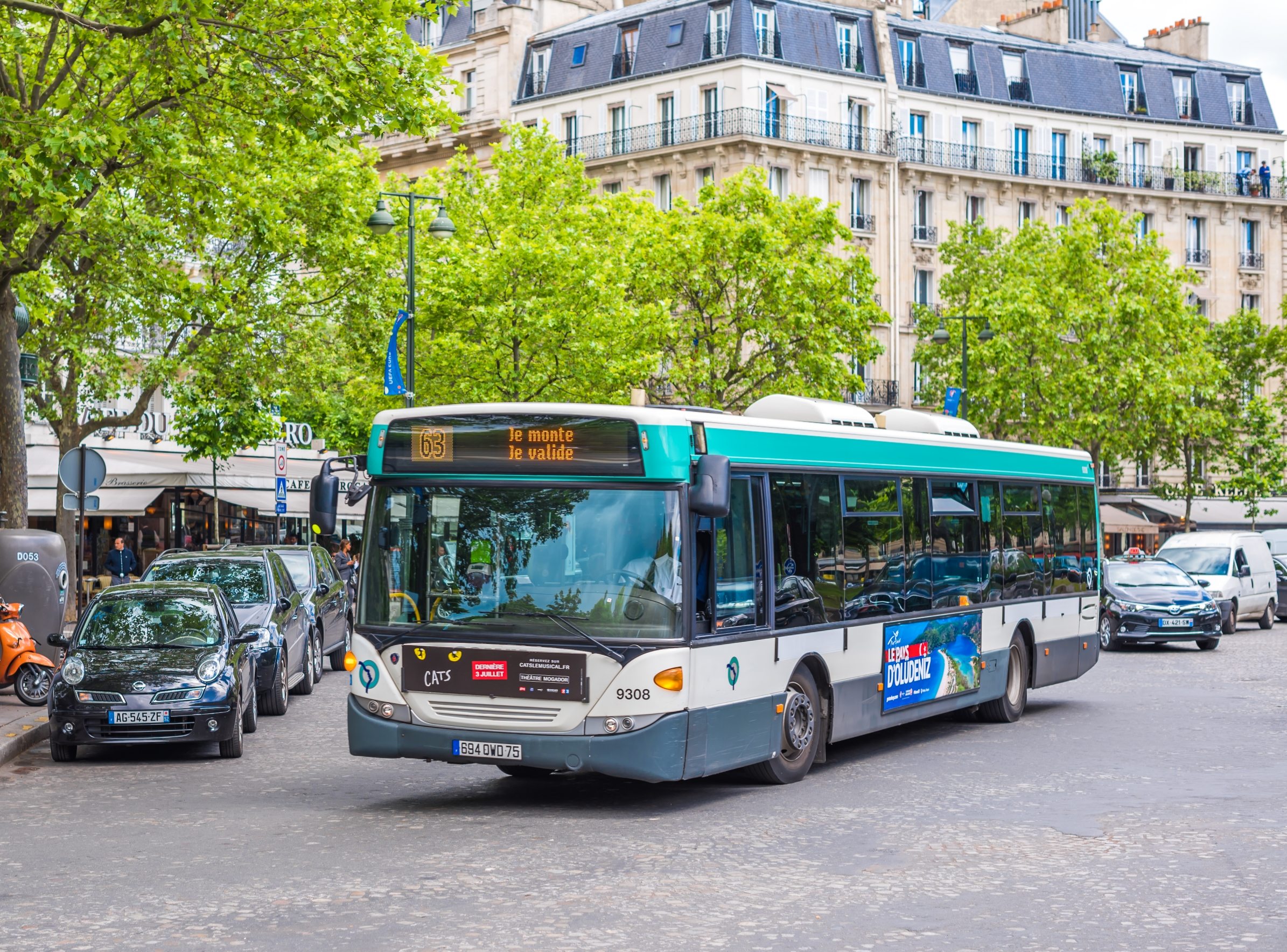
RATP Scania OmniCity in Paris, 2016

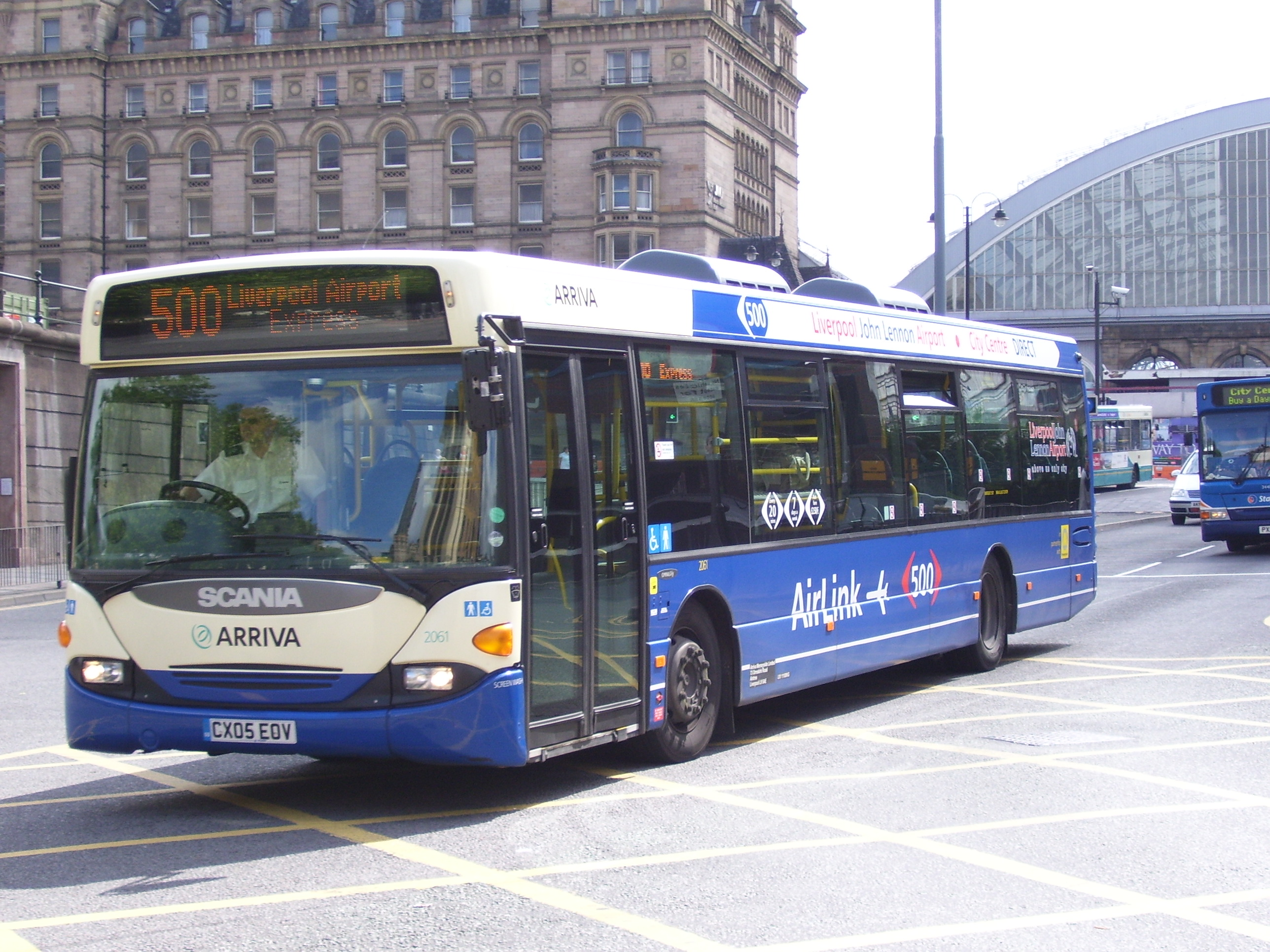
Arriva North West and Wales 4-series OmniCity in Liverpool in 2007

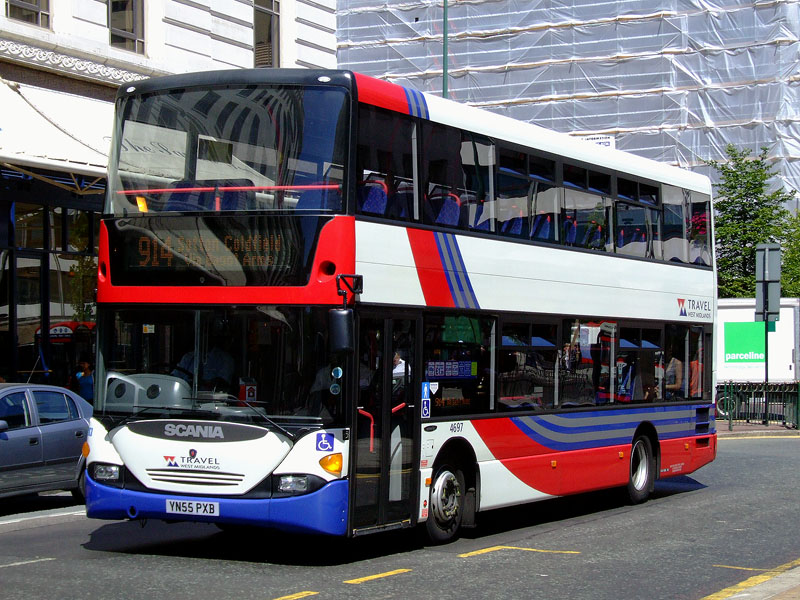
Travel West Midlands 4-series OmniCity demonstrator in 2006

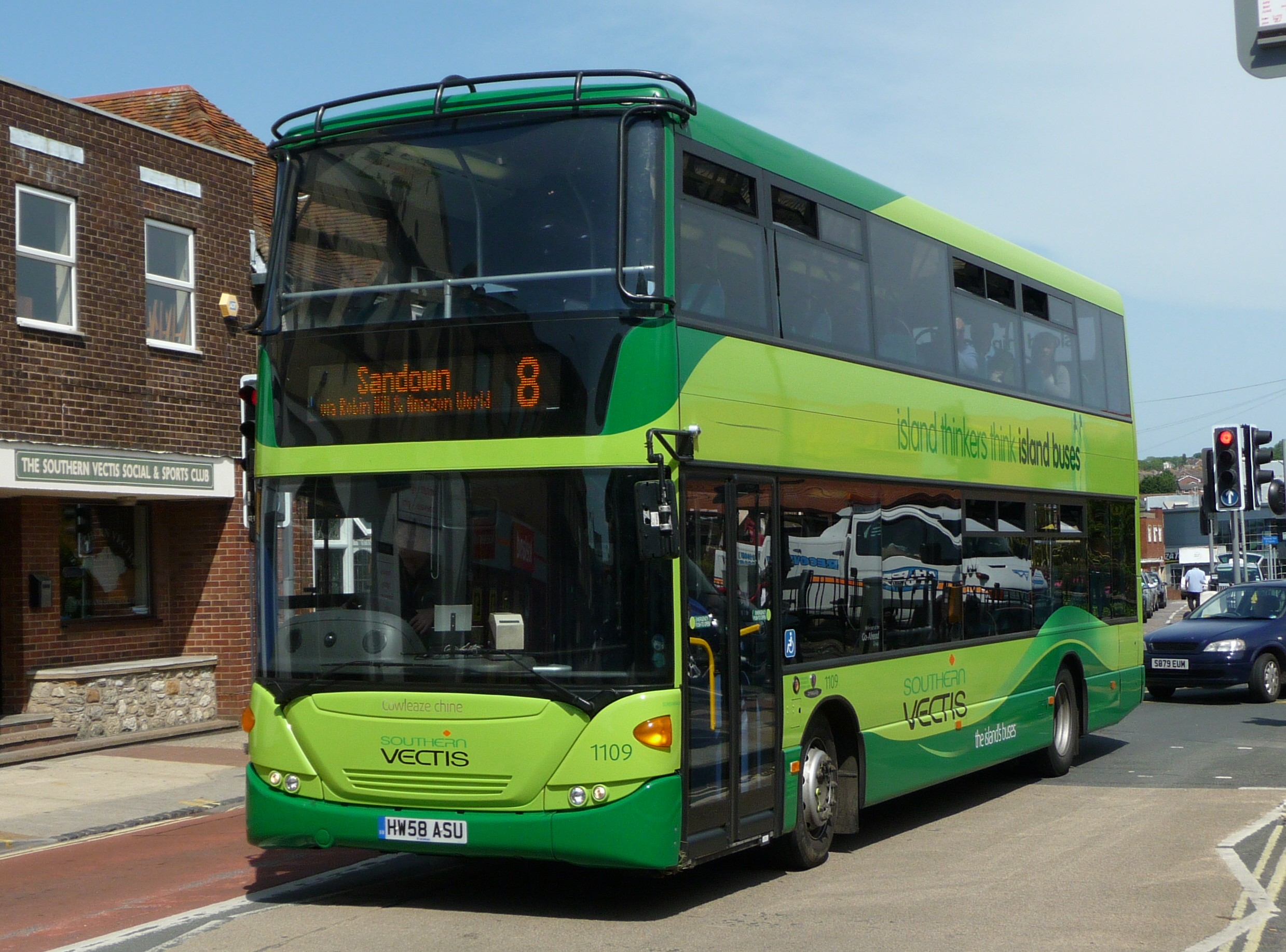
Southern Vectis N-series OmniCity in 2009

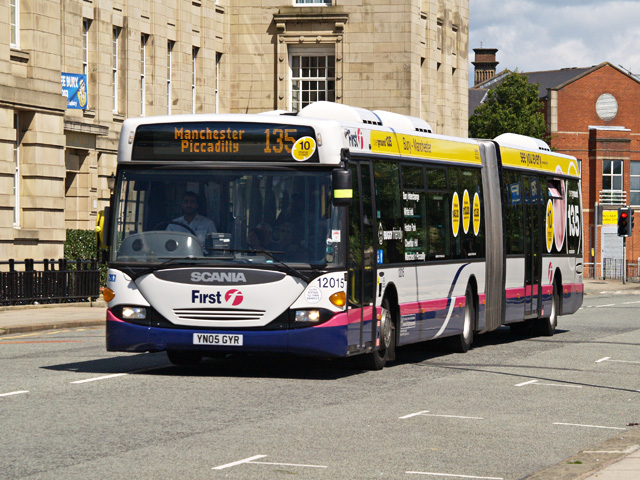
Articulated First Greater Manchester 4-series OmniCity in 2007

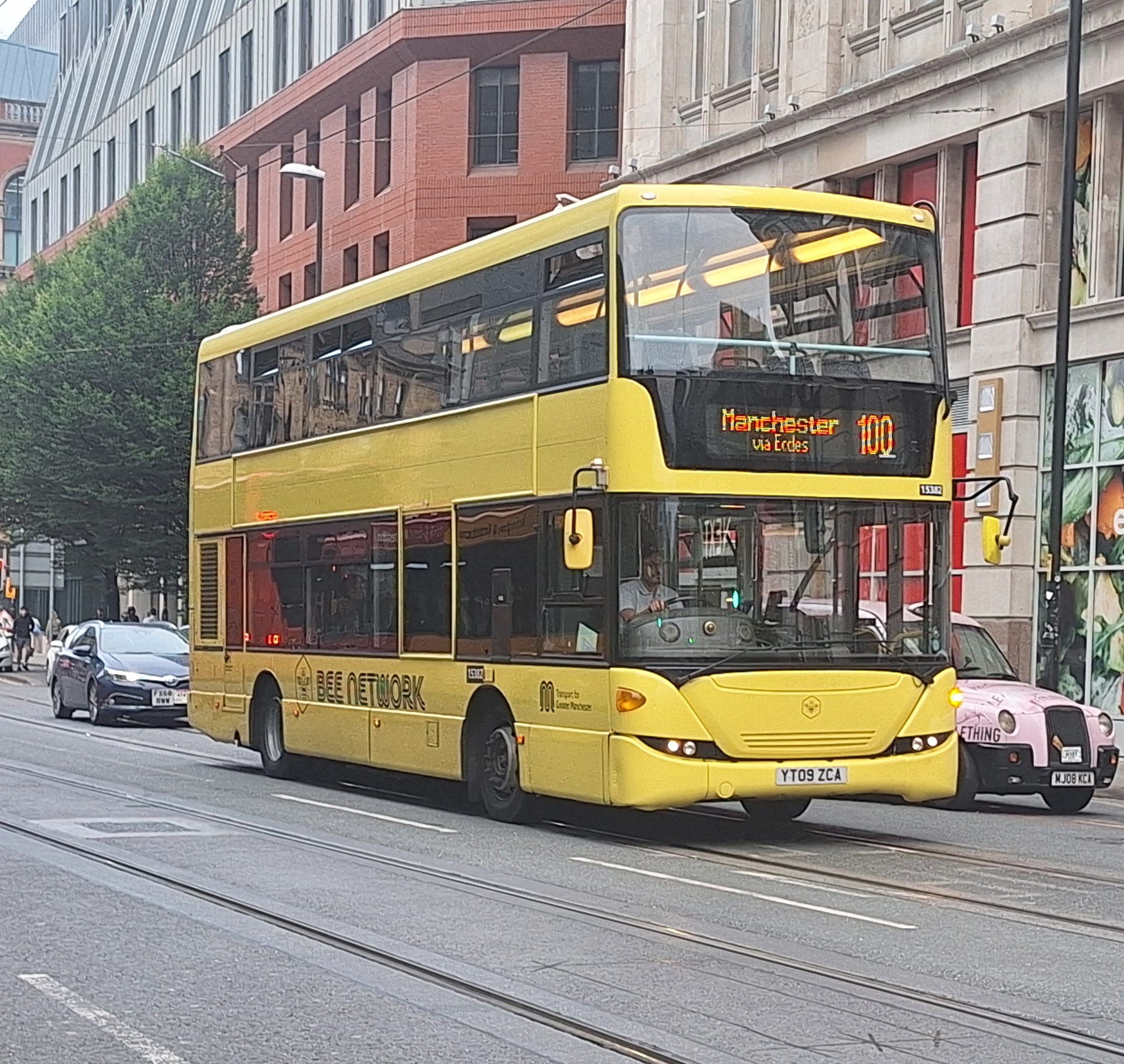
Stagecoach Manchester Bee Network branded OmniCity in 2024

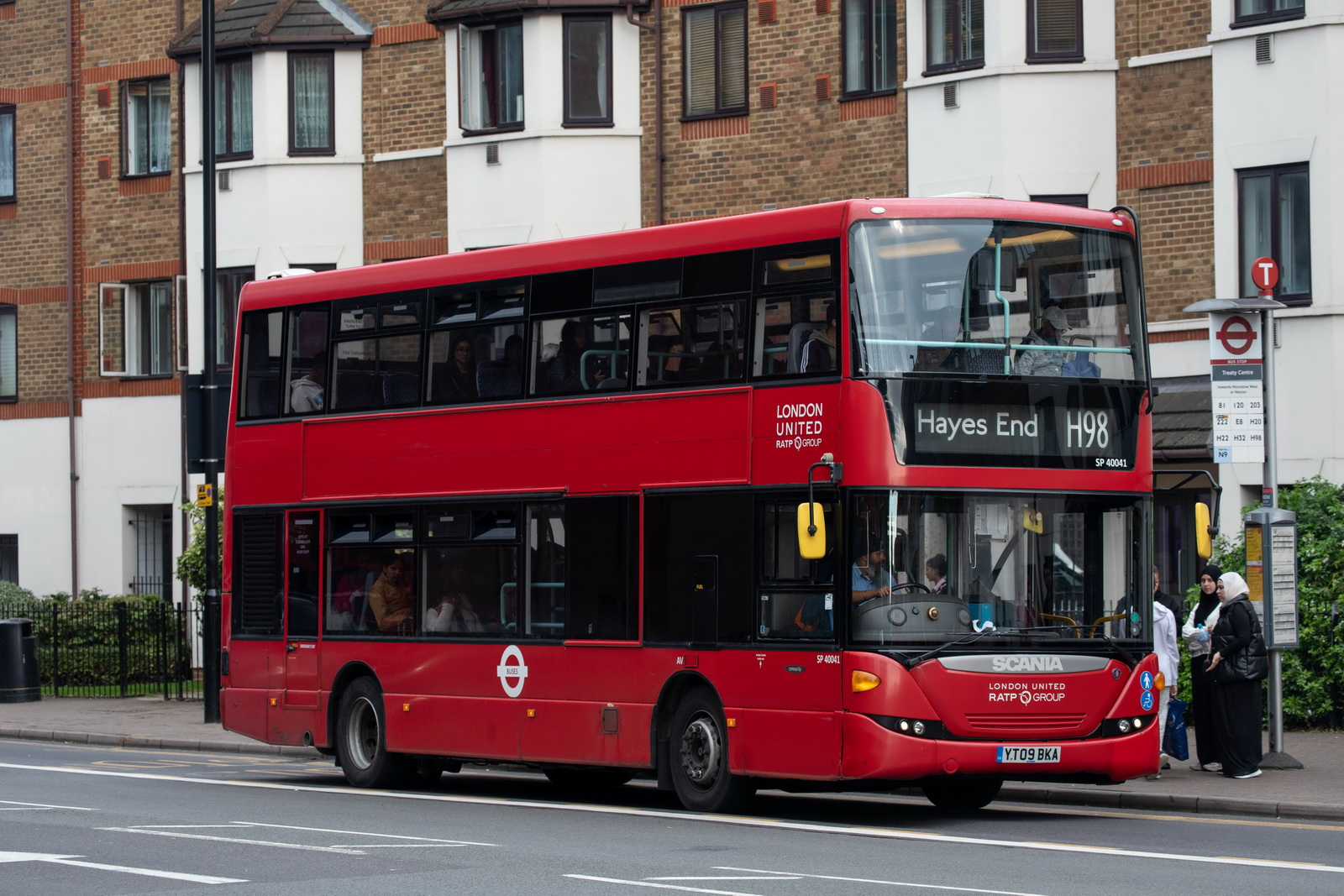
A London United Busways OmniCity On Route H98 to Hayes End

== See also ==
- List of buses
- East Lancs OmniDekka
- East Lancs OmniTown
- Scania OmniLink

Competitors

- Wright Eclipse/Eclipse Gemini
- Alexander Dennis Enviro200/Enviro400
