= Scania Fencer =

Scania low-floor bus range bodied by Higer Bus

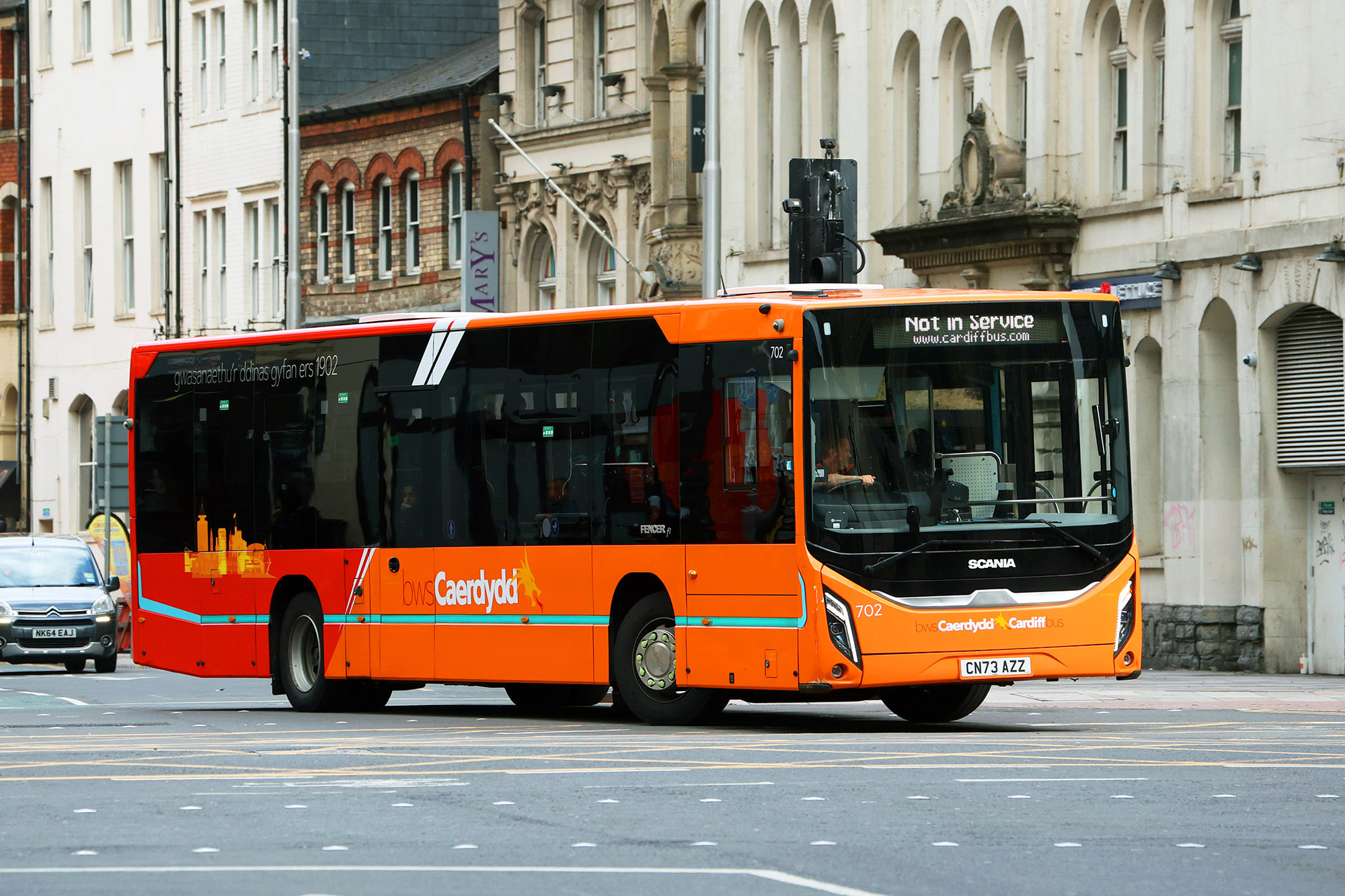
- Cardiff Bus Scania Fencer f1 in May 2025

Overview
- Manufacturer: Scania
- Production: 2021–
- Assembly: Chassis: Södertälje, Sweden; Body: Higer Bus, Suzhou, China

Body and chassis
- Class: Single-deck bus (f1); Coach (f6); Articulated bus (f18, planned)
- Doors: 1, 2 or 3 doors
- Floor type: Low floor
- Chassis: Scania K series
- Related: Scania Citywide

Powertrain
- Engine: Euro VI diesel; Scania DC07 I6 (280hp); Scania DC09 I5 (280hp); Scania DC09 I5 (320hp); Scania DC09 I5 (360hp)
- Capacity: Fencer f1; 45 seated, 29 standees; Fencer f6; 63 seated
- Transmission: ZF EcoLife 2

Dimensions
- Length: Fencer f1; 10.9 metres (36 ft) 12.2 metres (40 ft); Fencer f6; 13.1 metres (43 ft)
- Width: 2.6 metres (8.5 ft)
- Height: Fencer f1; 3.1 metres (10 ft)

Chronology
- Predecessor: Scania OmniCity

The Scania Fencer is a range of full-size buses produced by Scania and bodied by Higer Bus which was launched initially in the United Kingdom in 2021. The Fencer is planned to be offered in single deck (f1), coach (f6) and articulated (f18) variants with options for diesel, hybrid, biogas and electric drivetrains.

== Variants ==
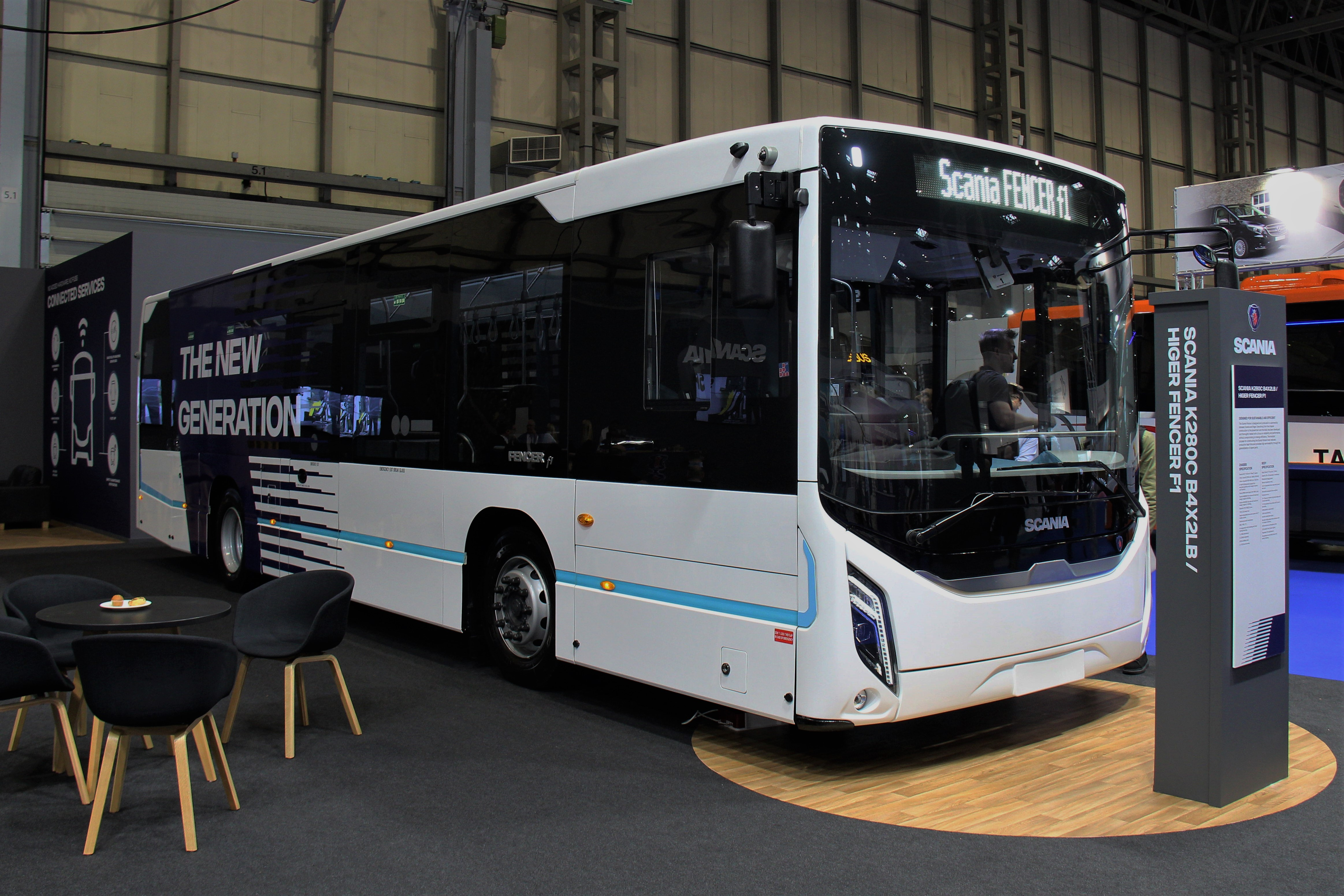
Scania Fencer f1 at the 2022 Euro Bus Expo

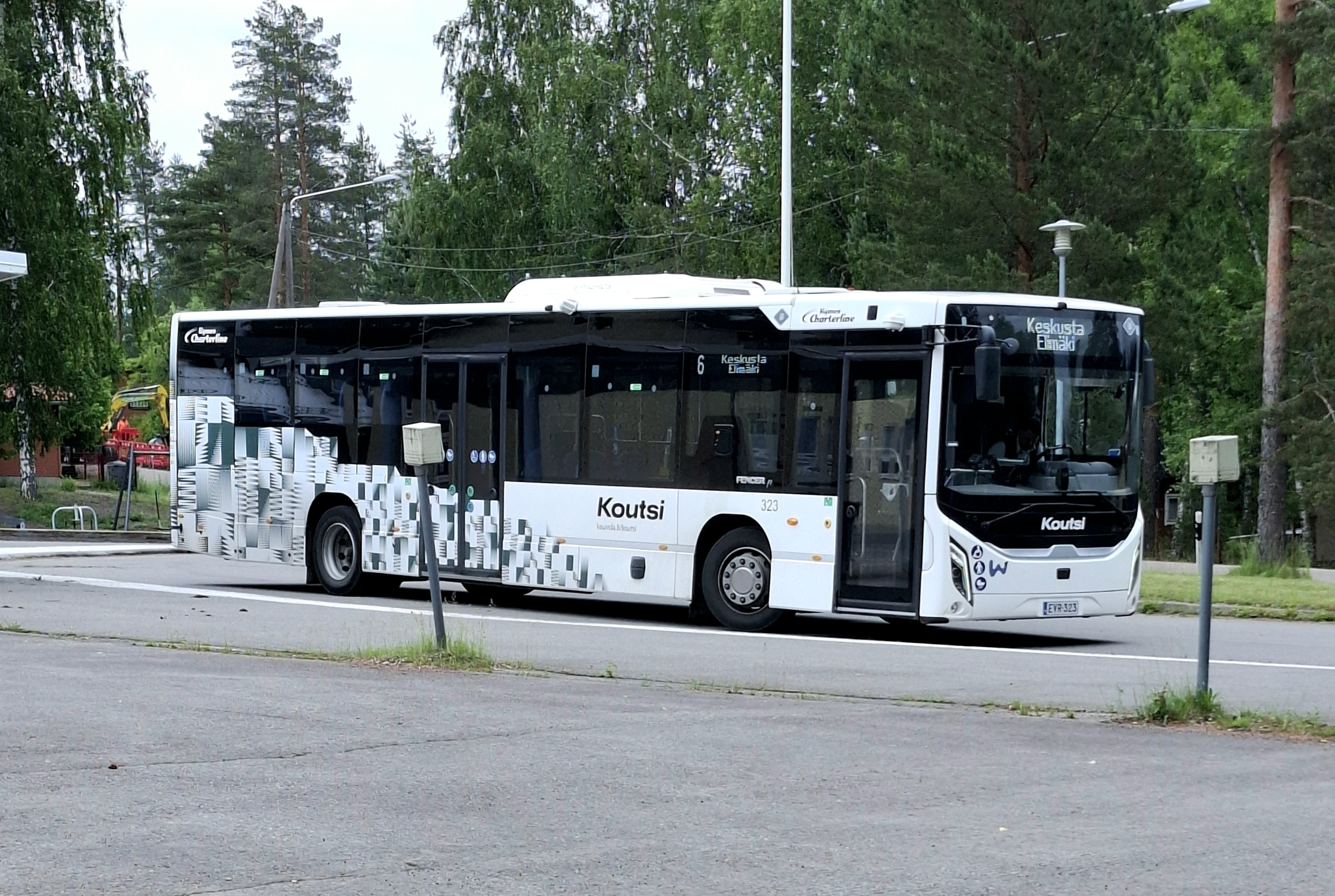
Scania Fencer f1 in Kouvola, Finland

=== Fencer f1 ===
The single-decker Fencer f1 was the first of the Fencer range produced by Scania, with regular production of the Fencer f1 for customers in the United Kingdom beginning in 2022; tri-axle, articulated and coach variants have been confirmed to follow, with Fencers built to Transport for London specification also planned for the UK market. The Fencer f1 was later launched in Continental Europe in September 2024 in both diesel and electric configurations, initially being marketed towards bus operators in Austria and Germany.

Two electric Scania Fencer f1's operated by Norwegian operator Tide for Vestfold Kollektivtrafikk.

A 12 m (39 ft) diesel single-decker Fencer f1 was sold to PC Coaches of Lincoln in 2021, following use as a Scania demonstrator. A shorter 10.9 m (36 ft) demonstrator for the United Kingdom market with a Scania DC07 engine was expected to be delivered in late 2022, while a battery-electric variant is also planned to be launched in early 2025, having been delayed due to the production of a new electric driveline featuring battery cells produced by Northvolt.

Q-Park Heathrow Airport were the first operator in the United Kingdom to place an order for the Fencer f1, ordering eleven 10.9 m (36 ft) Fencer f1s with DC07 engines on the new integral chassis, specified for airport bus services with air conditioning and luggage racking. The first two Fencers from this order entered service in November 2022. A further five Fencer f1s on Scania K280CB chassis were delivered to Ambassador Travel of Great Yarmouth and Passenger Plus of Tadworth in March 2023, later joined by a single delivery on the K280LB chassis for Moving People of Oswaldtwistle in July 2023.

Estonian bus operator GoBus were the first continental European operator to order the Fencer f1, taking delivery of 24 CNG-fuelled examples, four of which entered service in Harju County in December 2021 and the remaining 20 entering service in Narva in June 2022. 26 more Fencers have been ordered for delivery in 2022. Battery electric Fencer f1s are to be delivered as part of an order of 14 electric buses for use in the Swedish locality of Åre during 2025.

In 2026, Norwegian bus operator Tide was the first to put battery electric Scania buses into service in Norway, the type chosen being Fencer f1s. 41 Fencer f1 battery electric buses have entered service in the county of Vestfold; the county being the first in the country to have an all-electric fleet of public buses.

A single Fencer f1 built on a battery electric bus chassis entered service with Santiago de Chile bus operator Voy Santiago S.A. in May 2023 for trial services in the city.

=== Fencer f6 ===
In November 2021, Scania France took delivery of the first Fencer f6 school coach, built exclusively for use on French school bus networks with a capacity of up to 63 seats as well as four wheelchair spaces. The f6 can be built on either a biodiesel or biogas powertrain, the latter of which increases the height of the coach to 3.60 metres (11.8 ft) compared to 3.31 metres (10.9 ft) for the biodisel coach, as the biogas canisters are stored on the roof. 50 orders for the Fencer f6 have been placed, with delivery of the first examples expected to take place in June 2022.

=== Fencer f9 ===
A battery-electric double-decker Fencer named the Fencer f9 was among the variants announced at the launch of the Fencer range. However, as a result of Scania refocusing European chassis manufacturing towards low-entry buses as opposed to low-floor buses, the f9 was cancelled in 2024.

== See also ==
- Scania Citywide
- List of buses
