= Scania OmniLink =

Low-entry Scania city bus on integral chassis

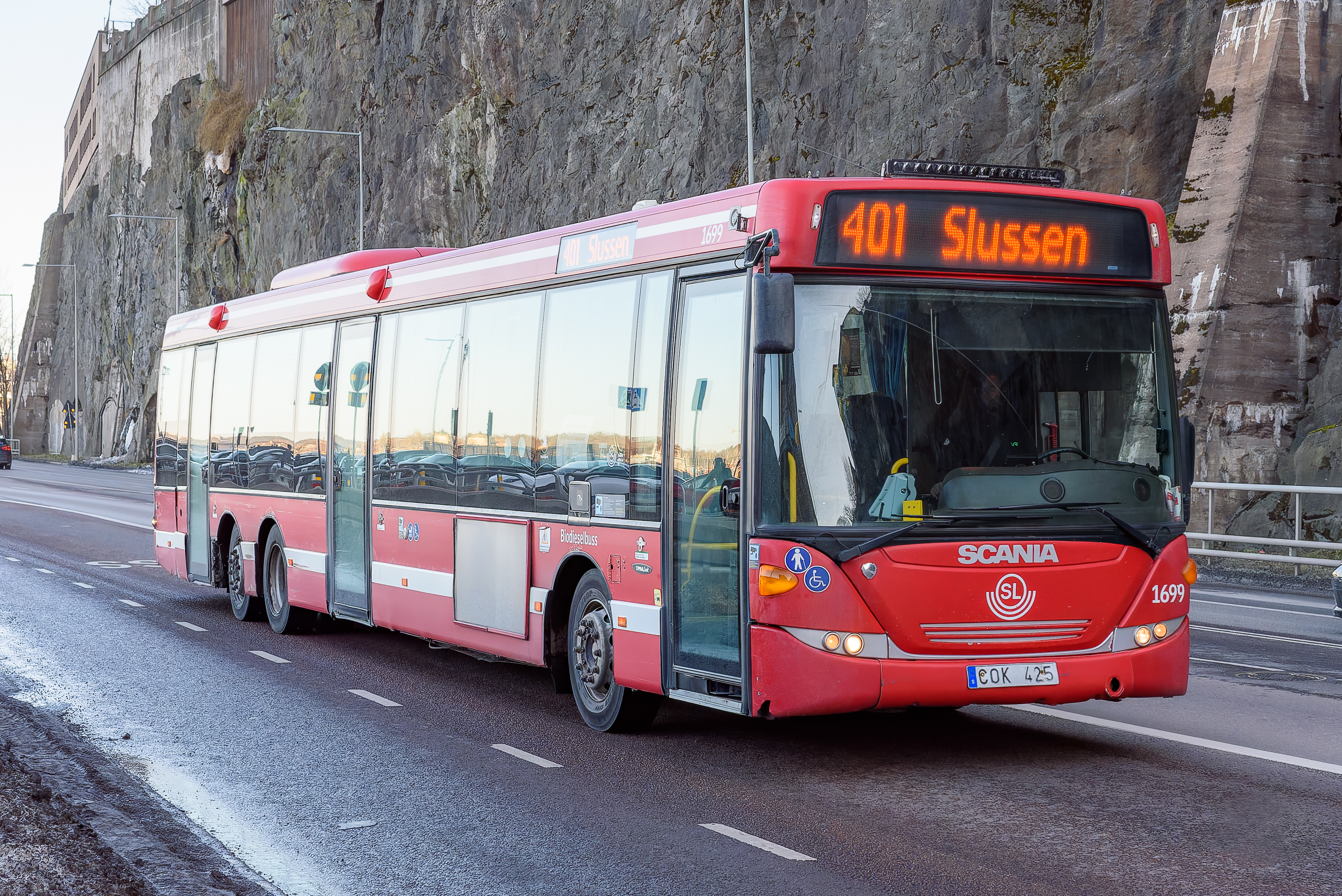
- A tri-axle Scania OmniLink in service with VR Sverige in 2026

Overview
- Manufacturer: Scania AB
- Production: 1998–2013

Body and chassis
- Doors: 1 to 3
- Floor type: Low entry
- Related: Scania OmniCity

Powertrain
- Capacity: 39 to 64 seated

Dimensions
- Length: 11.9 m (39 ft 1 in), 12.5 m (41 ft 0 in), 15 m (49 ft 3 in), 18 m (59 ft 1 in)
- Width: 2.5 m (8 ft 2 in)
- Height: 3.0 m (9 ft 10 in)

Chronology
- Successor: Scania Citywide LE; Scania Citywide LE Hybrid

The Scania OmniLink is a series of integrally constructed rear longitudinal-engined low-entry city buses available on the European market. It is a complete integral product built by Scania of Sweden.

The OmniLink was launched in 1998 with an inclined engine and was designated CL94UB, and an articulated version was designated CL94UA. But when the Euro IV version was introduced in 2006, the engine was no longer tilted and the designation changed to CK230UB/CK270UB/CK280UB/CK310UB/CK320UB for the rigid version. The OmniLink's floor raises at the rear section when compared to the flat-floored OmniCity.

Production of the OmniLink ceased in 2013. It was superseded by the Scania Citywide LE for left-hand drive markets and Irizar i3-bodied Scania K UBs for right-hand drive markets.

== Operators ==
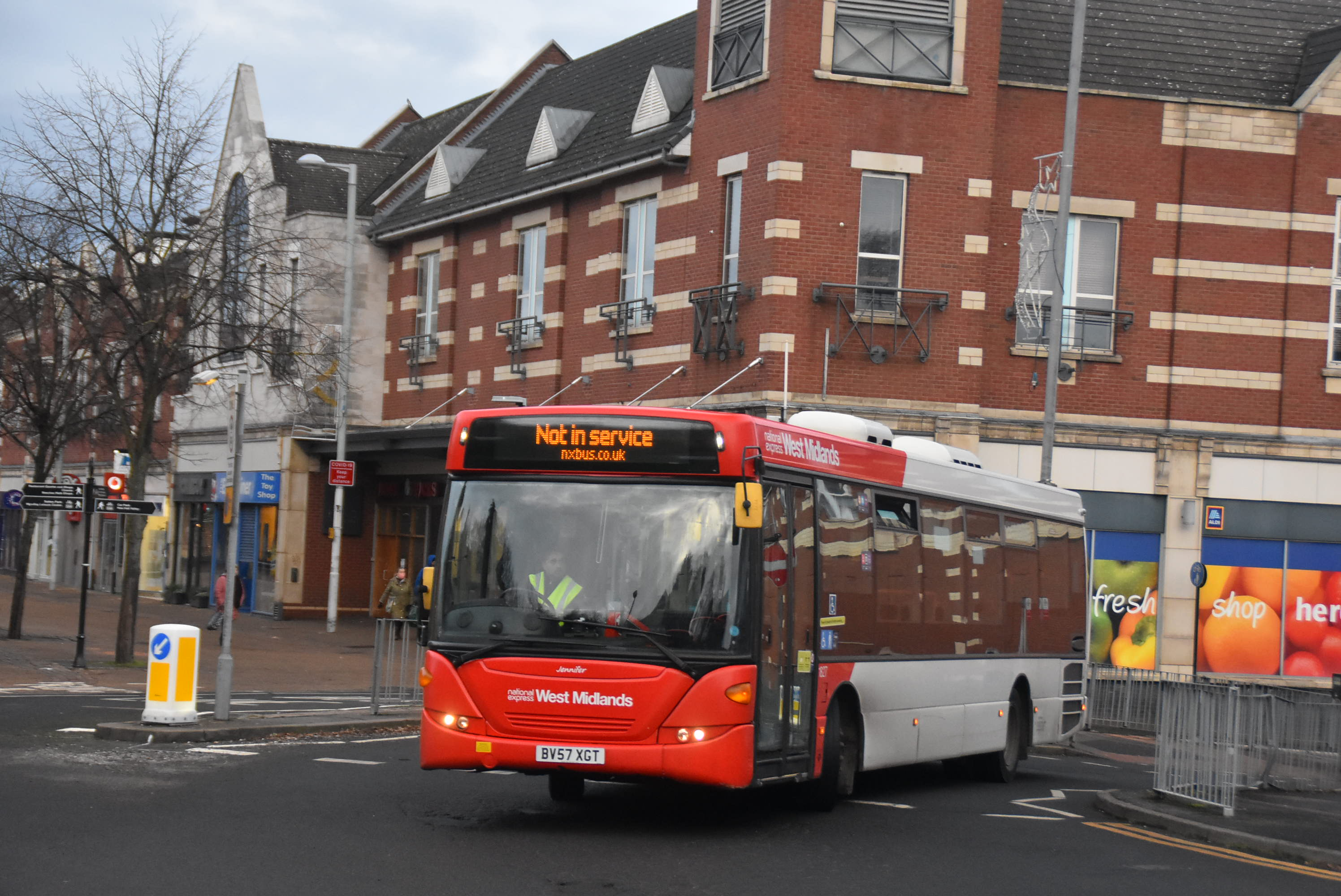
National Express West Midlands Scania OmniLink in Sutton Coldfield, England, in January 2021

Initially, the OmniLink was only produced in left-hand drive configurations for the Continental European market. OmniLinks were sold in large numbers to various Arriva subsidiaries across Europe such as Arriva Danmark, and a total 140 OmniLinks were also sold for service in St Petersburg in Russia by 2005, where a factory producing Scania products was formerly located. Six ethanol-fuelled OmniLink hybrid fuel cell buses entered service with Swebus in 2009 on a two-year trial period in Stockholm.

=== United Kingdom and Ireland ===
From 2006, right-hand drive OmniLinks for the United Kingdom and Ireland were produced, with the first three right-hand drive models on tri-axle chassis being delivered to Nottingham City Transport in 2007. Nottingham City Transport also trialled 3 ethanol hybrid-fuelled OmniLinks, which were used on EcoLink 30, from Nottingham to Wollaton; the trial was not a success, and the buses were later converted back to diesel.

National Express West Midlands and National Express Dundee were the most significant operator of right-hand drive OmniLinks, taking delivery of a total of 180 two-axle OmniLinks between 2008 and 2010. Fifteen of these were initially delivered to the Dundee operation, but these would be later transferred to the West Midlands operation. Bus Éireann, meanwhile, purchased 25 OmniLinks for service in Cork, while Arriva Midlands purchased nineteen to upgrade fleets in Tamworth and Derby, Brighton & Hove purchased seven, and two were delivered to Johnsons Excelbus. Nine K270UB tri-axles were delivered to Stagecoach in Fife for use on an Express City Connect service between Dunfermline and Edinburgh in October 2007, three of which would later be transferred to Stagecoach North East for similar express work.
