= VDL Citea =

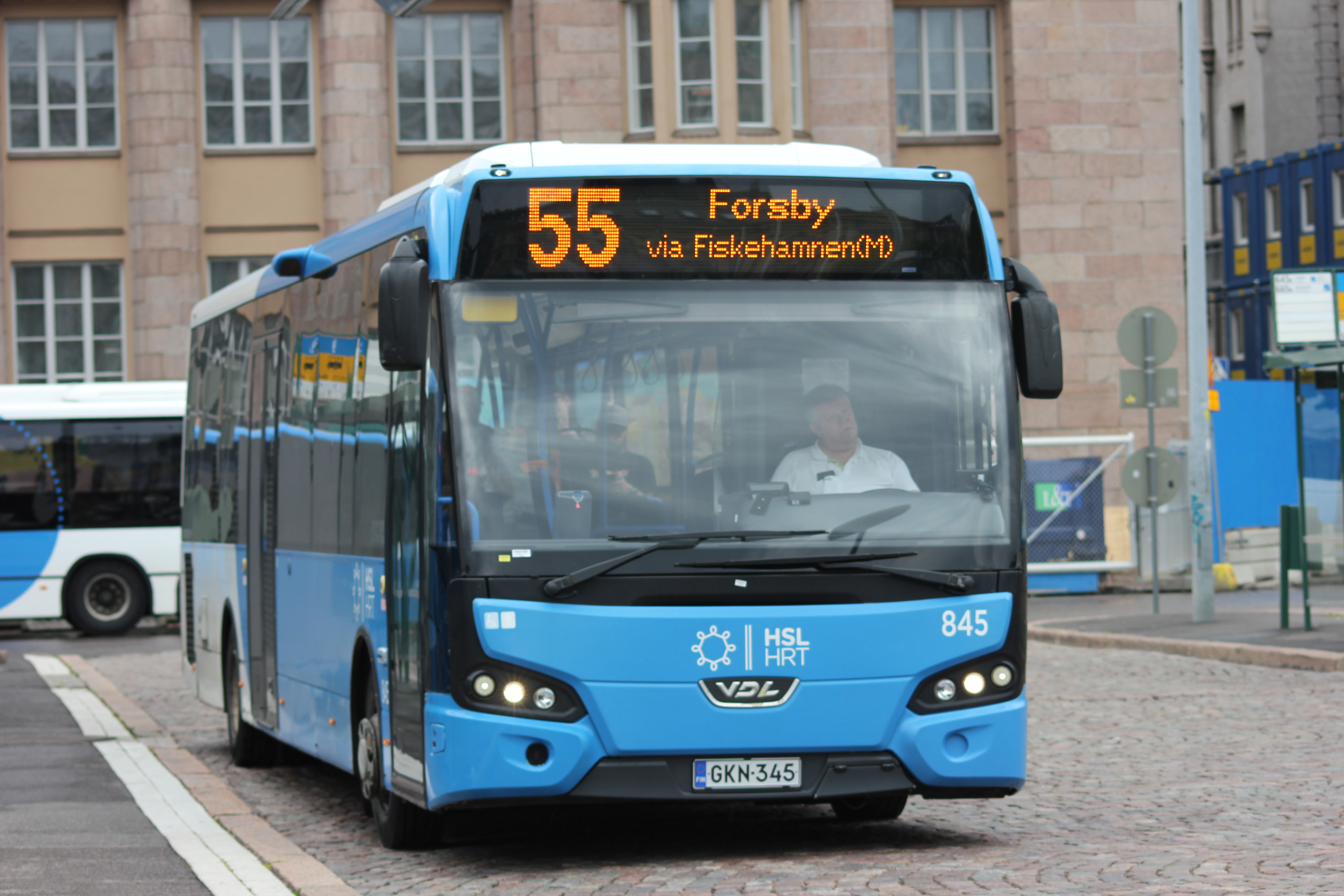
- HSL VDL Citea in Helsinki in August 2020

Overview
- Manufacturer: VDL
- Production: 2007-present
- Assembly: Eindhoven, Netherlands

The VDL Citea is a city bus built by VDL Bus & Coach. It was released at the UITP Mobility and City Transport Exhibition 2007 in Helsinki. The series received a facelift in 2010 and further overhaul in 2020.

The Citea is sold in three different variants, as low entry bus (CLE, Citea Low Entry), as a light-weight low-entry bus (LLE, Light Low Entry), and as a low-floor bus with tower engine (CLF, Citea Low Floor). A double-deck variant (DLF, Double Deck Low Floor) exists as a prototype and is in trial with Berliner Verkehrsbetriebe (BVG) since August 2015.

== History ==
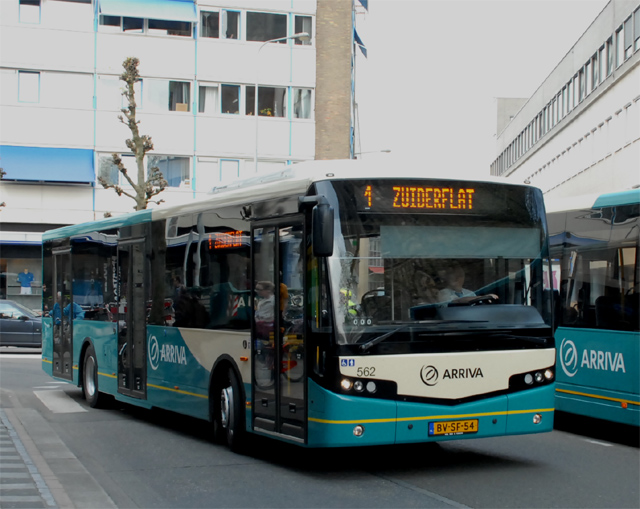
Arriva VDL Citea in Groningen in April 2009

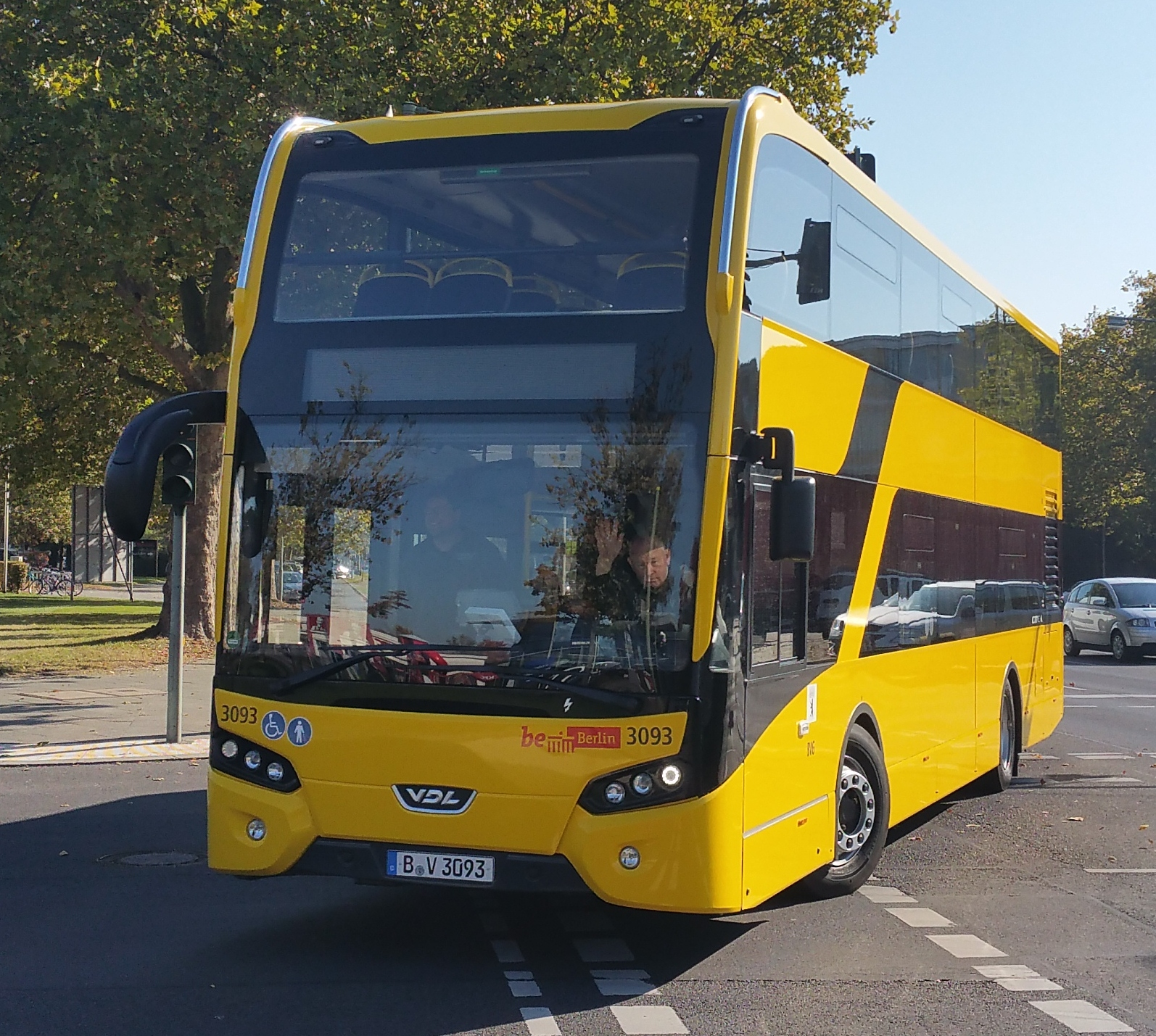
VDL Citea DLF demonstrator in Berlin

The first 10 Citeas were ordered in 2008 by Connexxion. In November 2008, 518 were ordered by the Roads and Transport Authority (Dubai), the first Citea were delivered to Dubai on June 29, 2009. In June / July, a Citea CLF 120 was handed over to the first customer in Germany, the HEAG mobiBus from Darmstadt, another model has been in private ownership since 2011 in Bayreuth / Upper Franconia and operates on the city network.

In April 2011, GVB, Amsterdam ordered 70 Citea.

In January 2013, VDL received an order for 60 Citea LLEs from Rheinbahn. The two test vehicles of the lightweight model previously achieved higher fuel savings in a two-year test than a hybrid vehicle, which was also tested by the Rheinbahn in the same period.

In 2014, the Berliner Verkehrsbetriebe (BVG) signed a supply contract with VDL for up to 236 VDL Citea, which was to modernise the fleet of Berlin's public transport companies by 2019. The first 40 vehicles were delivered in 2015, until 2016, the delivery of another 70 vehicles. In October 2016, the BVG announced not to retrieve all 236 vehicles from the contract. It remains with the 110 previously delivered vehicles. A justification why not all vehicles are retrieved from the supply contract has not been formally named.

Due to its cost effectiveness and environmental friendliness, the Citea was named Bus of the Year 2011 at the IAA in Hanover on 23 September 2010.

== Hybrid bus ==
On 1 December 2010, two CLF120 Hybrid Citeas from Connexxion were presented in Enschede. The hybrid technology came from Vossloh Kiepe. The bus was constructed using TU Darmstadt. In March 2011, three Citea SLF120Hybrid were delivered to the HEAG mobibus.

== Electric bus ==
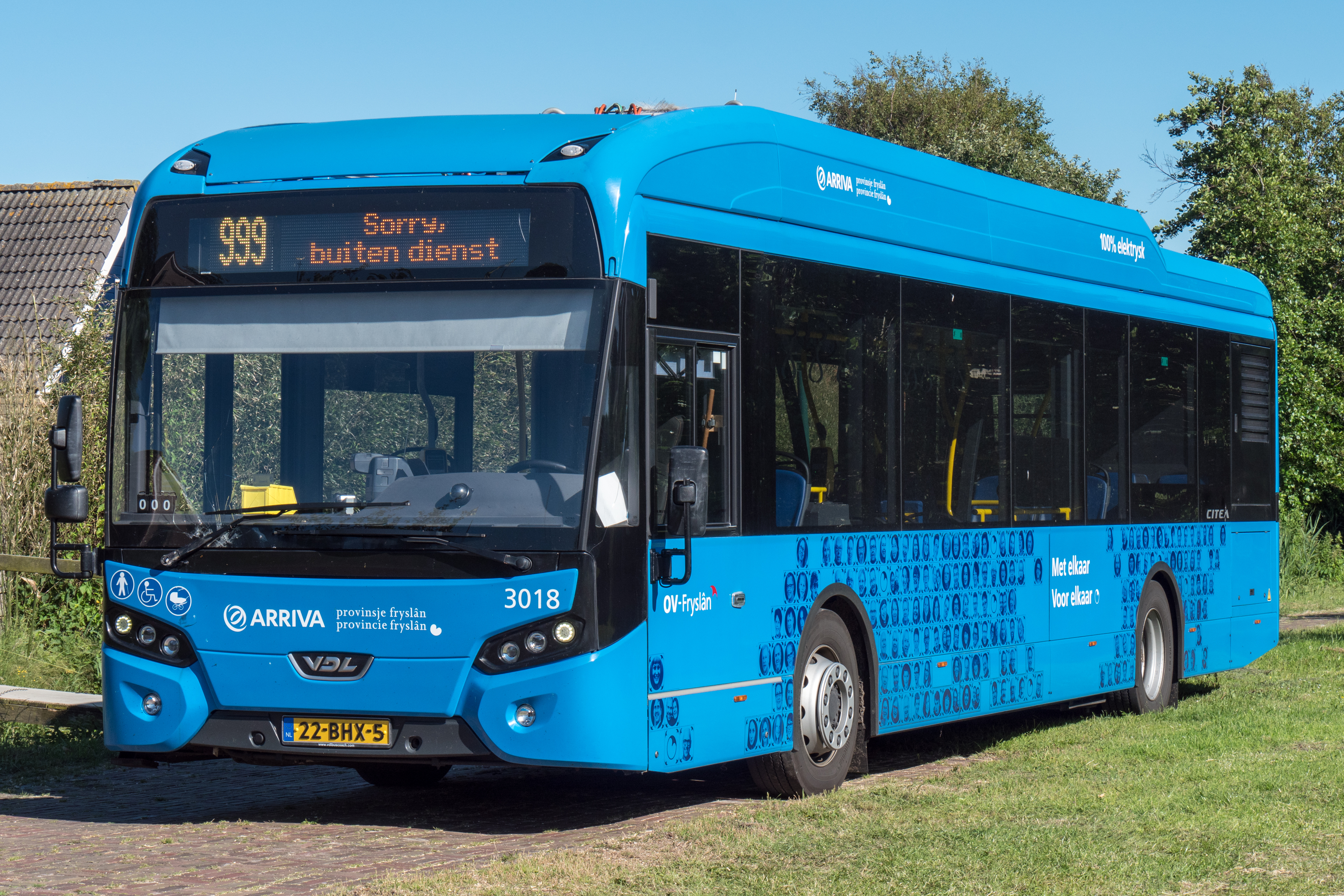
VDL Citea SLF-120 Electric in Nes (Ameland)

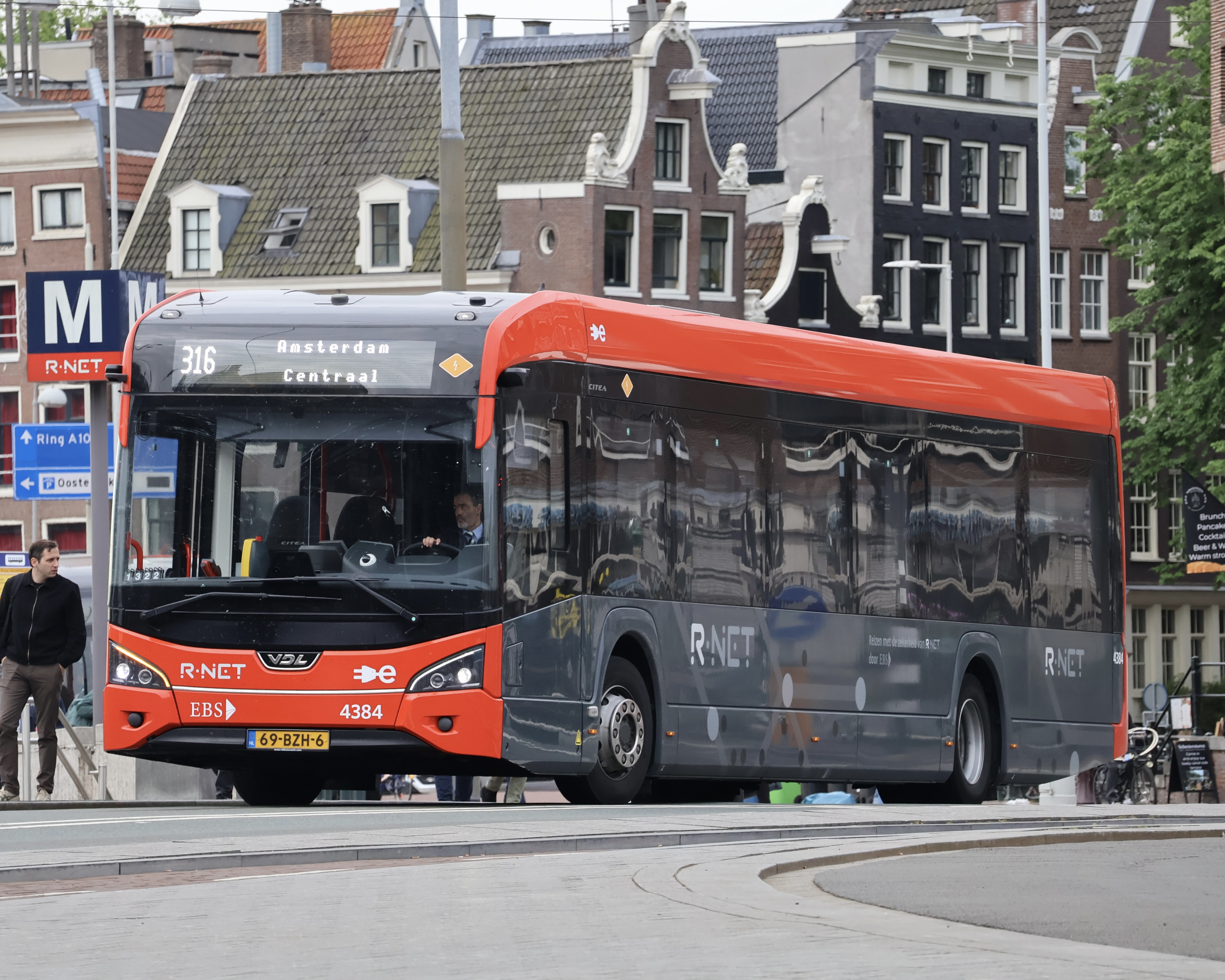
VDL Citea LE-135 Electric operated by EBS in Amsterdam

The Citea SLF Electric is a 12-meter-long, all-electric low-floor bus. The buyer can choose from various electric drives and battery packs.

The Citea SLFA 181 Electric is an 18.1-meter-long, all-electric articulated bus. It was first presented to the public in May 2015 as part of the World Congress of UITP in Milan. In order to recharge the 1380 kg lithium-ion battery with an energy content of 122.6 kWh in operation, the Citea SLFA Electric has a pantograph fast-charging system. The pantograph is installed on the roof of the front car above the second axle. At the final stops they can be recharged with up to 250 kW charging power. The bus has 43 seats and 82 standing places. The Citea SLFA Electric is used since 2016, inter alia, on the E-bus line 133 of the Cologne transport operations (8 vehicles).

At Hermes in Eindhoven, since December 2016, a total of 43 Citea SLFA-181 Electric articulated buses have been used under the brand name "Bravo". this is one of the largest electric bus fleets in Europe. Schiphol Busnet also uses these buses, as well as R-Net lines between Schiphol and Amsterdam/Haarlem.

On 8 June 2020, as part of the efficiency mission in electric vehicles, R-Net 436 serving Rotterdam and the Dutch island of "Goeree-Overflakkee" trialled out with a trailer hitched to the back of a VDL Citea SLF-120 consisting of electric batteries mounted on the roof. The trailer also known as a range extender which consists of a hydrogen tank which performs an endothermic chemical reaction with the use of fuel cells that power the electric motor. In order to save space in the main bus, the fuel cells and tanks are provided in the trailer rather than in the bus itself. With this technology, the buses can cover a range of up to 350 km.
