= Scania Citywide =

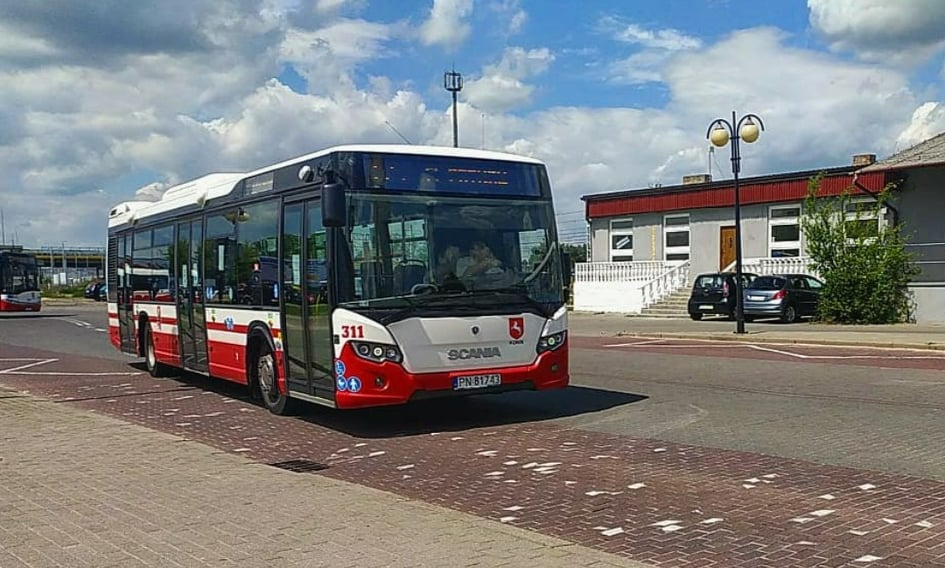

Overview
- Manufacturer: Scania
- Also called: Scania Citywide LE/Scania Citywide LEA/Scania Citywide LF/Scania Citywide LFA/Scania Citywide LFDD
- Production: 2011–2024
- Assembly: Poland: Słupsk

Body and chassis
- Class: Complete bus
- Body style: Single-decker/double-decker city/intercity bus
- Layout: Longitudinal/transverse rear-engine design
- Doors: 2 doors, 3 doors and 4 doors.
- Floor type: Low floor; Low entry

Powertrain
- Engine: Euro V/EEV; 9.3 L DC9 I5 (diesel); 9.3 L DC9 E02 I5 (ED95); 9.3 L OC9 I5 (CNG or biomethane); Euro VI; 6.7 L DC07 I6 280hp 1100Nm (diesel); 9.3 L DC09 I5 250/280/320/360hp 1250–1700Nm (diesel or biodiesel); 9.3 L OC09 I5 280/320/340hp 1350–1600Nm (CNG or biomethane); TBA (ED95)
- Power output: 250-360 hp
- Transmission: 6-Speed ZF Ecomat; 6-Speed ZF Ecolife; 6-speed Scania fully automatic; 8-speed Scania Opticruise

Dimensions
- Length: 12–18.1 m (39 ft 4 in – 59 ft 5 in)
- Width: 2.55 m (8 ft 4 in)
- Height: 3.3–3.4 m (10 ft 10 in – 11 ft 2 in)

Chronology
- Predecessor: Scania OmniCity; Scania OmniLink
- Successor: Scania Fencer

The Scania Citywide is a series of integrally-constructed low-floor and low-entry buses manufactured by Scania from 2011 to 2024 as the successor to the Scania OmniCity and OmniLink. It consists of two models: the Citywide LF is built on the Scania N-series chassis, whereas the Citywide LE rides on the Scania K-series chassis. These were exclusively available in mainland Europe, except in the UK and Ireland, where Scania chose to rely on Alexander Dennis, Irizar and other local bodywork manufacturers instead. The series shares some front styling details with the Touring coach, while most of the design is a simple facelift from its prior models.

The Scania Citywide was assembled at Scania's plant in Słupsk, Poland as part of Scania's complete range of buses (alongside the flagship Touring and the inter-capacity alternative Interlink). Production of the Citywide will cease alongside the Interlink and Low-Floor chassis as part of a restructuring of the Scania Bus division in 2024.

== Scania Citywide LF ==
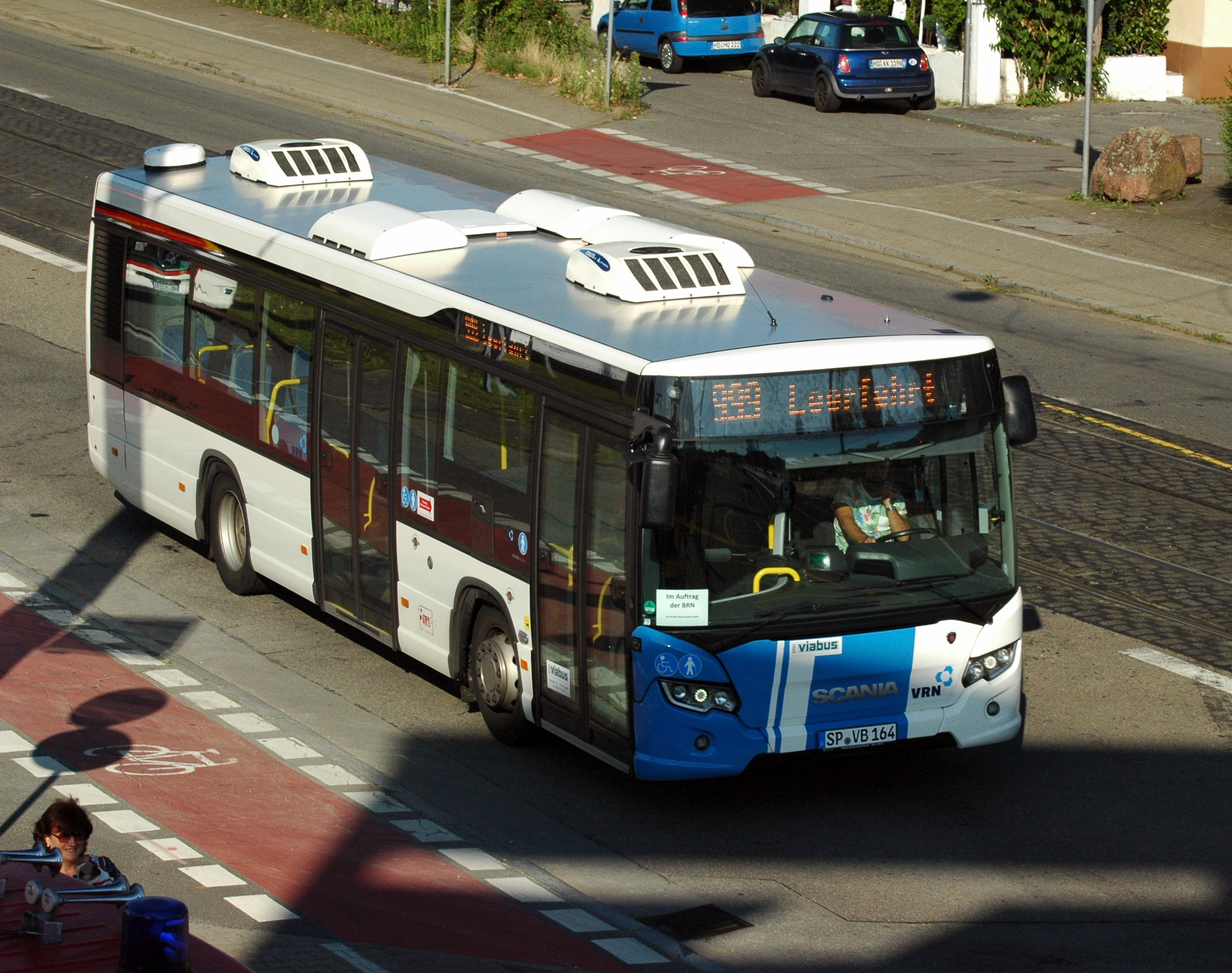
Scania CN 230 UB4x2EB Citywide LF

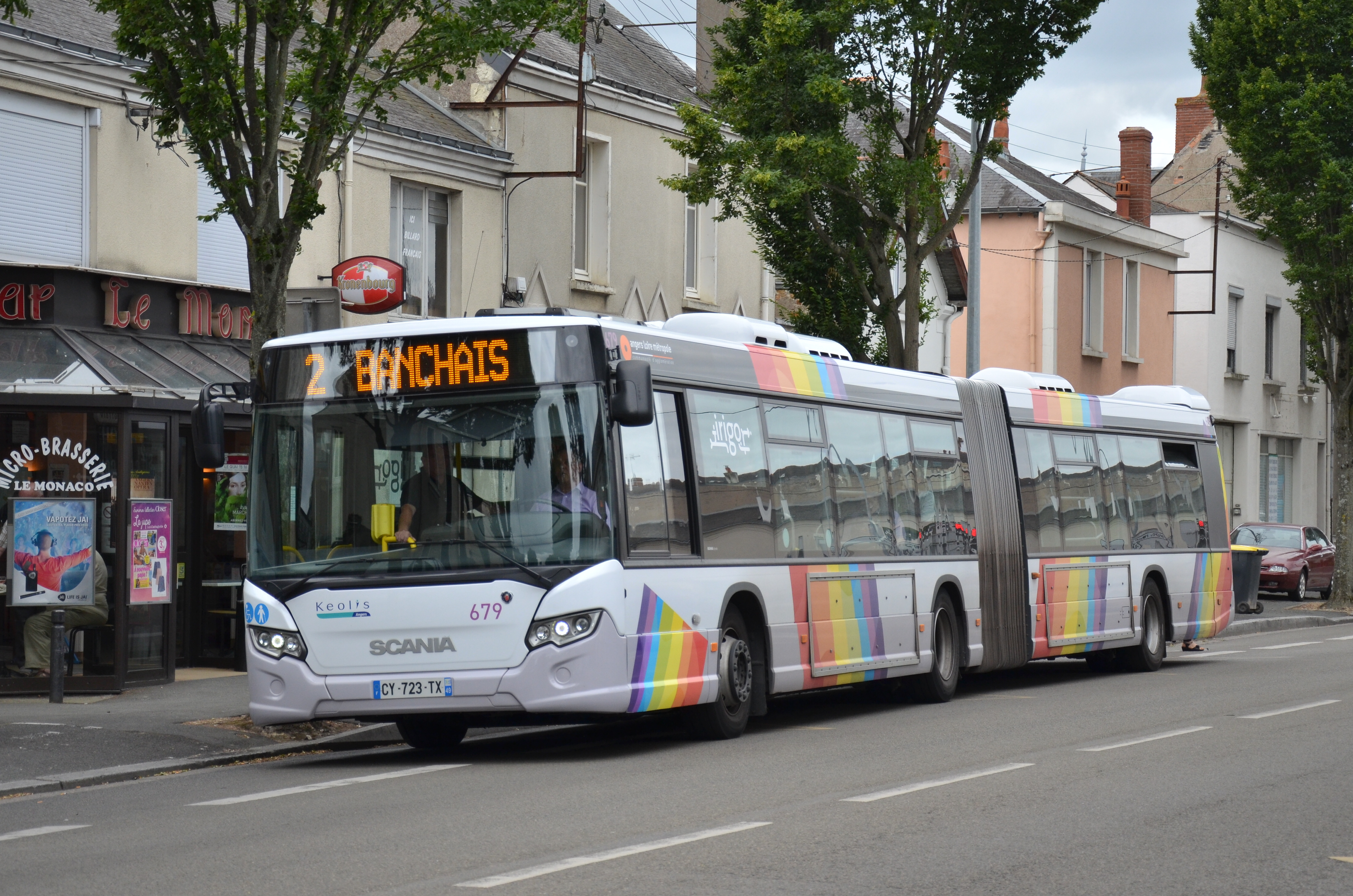
Scania CN 280 UA6x2/2EB Citywide LF

The Scania Citywide LF (CN) is a transverse-engined low-floor city bus based on the Scania N-series chassis. It replaces the Scania OmniCity in 2011. This bus is entirely low-floor and is intended for intense inner-city services. It is available as a two-axle (CN UB4x2EB) between 10.9 and 12.0 metres and as an articulated bus (CN UA6x2/2EB) at 18.0 metres, known as the Scania Citywide LFA.

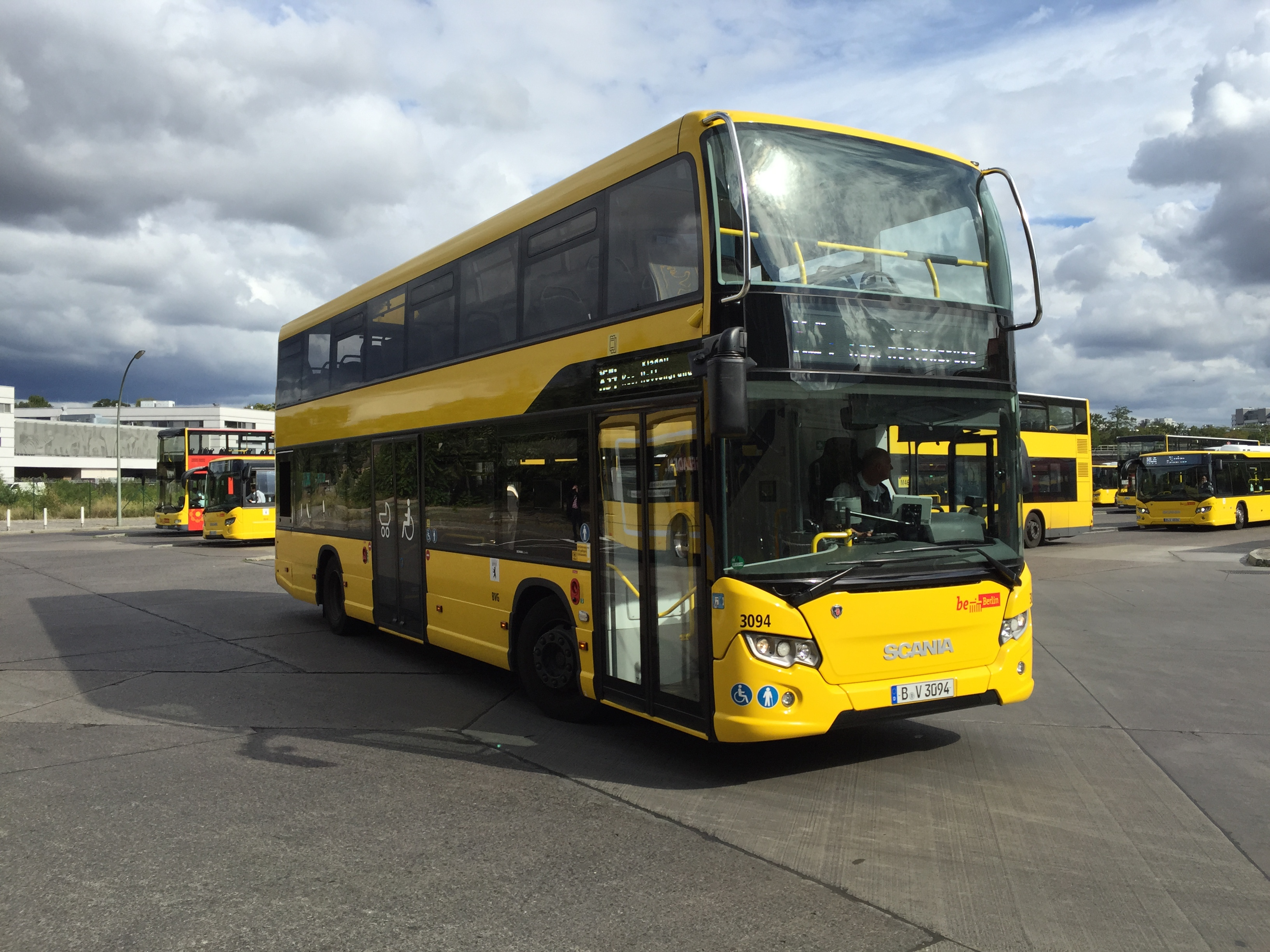
Scania Citywide LFDD

The Scania Citywide LFDD (CN UD4x2EB) is a double-decker bus demonstrator based on the Citywide LF, which was placed an order for one from Berliner Verkehrsbetriebe (BVG) in 2014, with the first being delivered in February 2015. The LFDD utilizes the newly-developed 6.7-litre DC07 engine, which is a rebranded Cummins ISB 6.7 and a ZF Ecolife 6AP1402B Gearbox.

== Scania Citywide LE ==
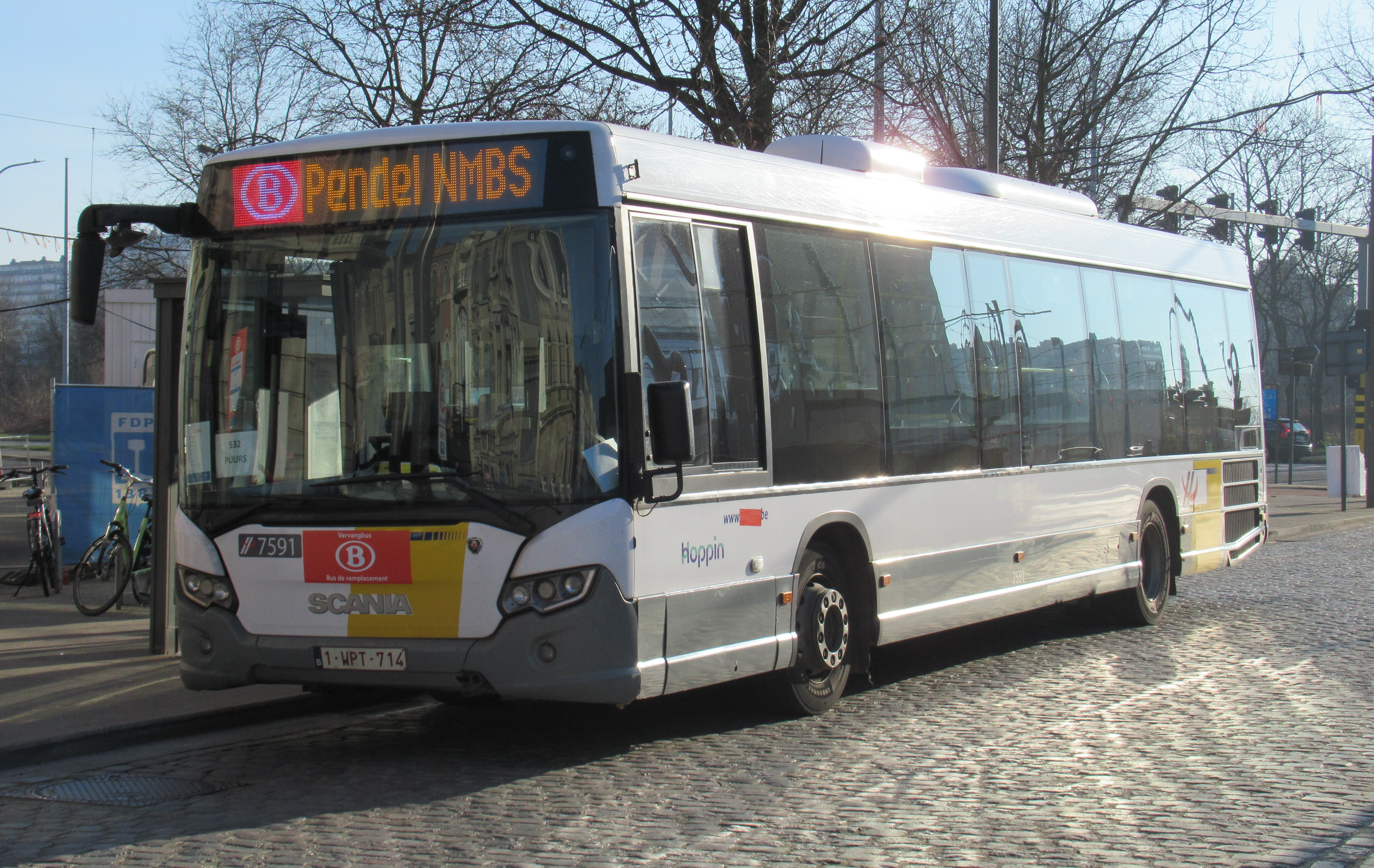
Scania Citywide LE

The Scania Citywide LE (CK) is a longitudinally-engined low-entry city and intercity bus. It is based on the Scania K-series chassis, and was introduced in 2011 to replace the Scania OmniLink. This bus is not entirely low floor, although it does contain a low entrance and low floor area at the front of the bus; it is intended for quieter intercity or suburban routes. It is available as a two- (CK UB4x2LB) or tri-axle (CK UB6x2*4LB) between 12.0 and 14.8 metres, and as an articulated bus (CK UA6x2/2LB) at 18.1 metres, known as the Scania Citywide LEA.

In 2013, Scania started testing the Citywide LE as a diesel-electric hybrid-powered bus, and in 2014 both the 12.0-metre two-axle and the 14.8-metre tri-axle were introduced in diesel-electric hybrid-powered versions.

A Suburban version of the Citywide LE is also available from 2017, known as the Scania Citywide LE Suburban.

For the Nordic markets, Scania released in 2014 an in-house competitor to the Citywide LE with the Scania OmniExpress 3.20 LE. An interesting design is that the Citywide LE Hybrid has a swooping roofline in the front and the rear it is a rear roof spoiler.

== Second Generation (2019–2024) ==
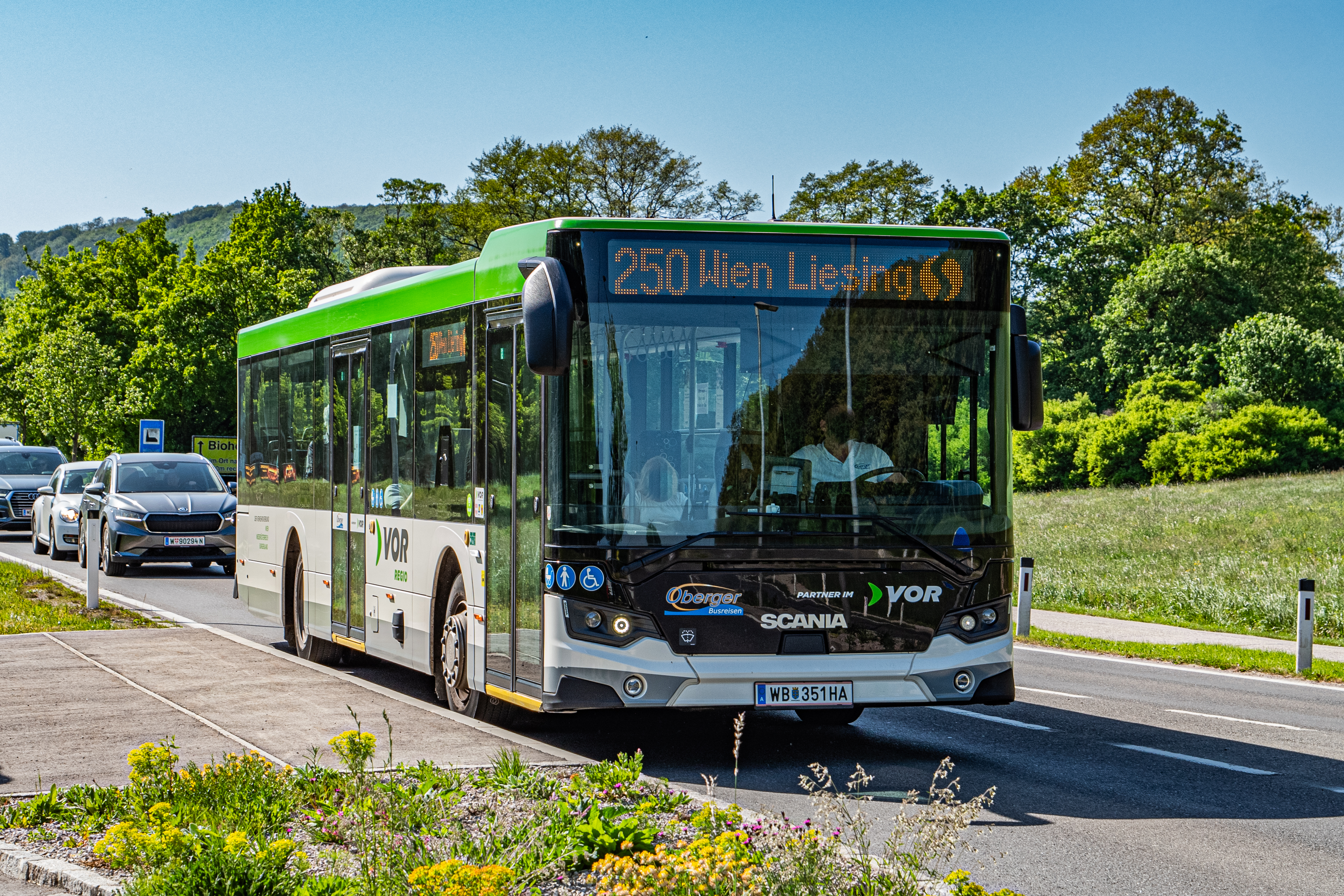
Second Generation Citywide.

The second generation Citywide was unveiled to the public on 17 October 2019. It featured a seven-inch semi digital instrument cluster as well as a new steering wheel with audio controls similar to its found in modern trucks. The new Citywide LF featured a side-mounted longitudinal engine instead of transverse engine.

In addition to the internal combustion engine, a battery electric version (Citywide BEV) was also made available for the first time.

== See also ==
- List of buses
