= Solaris Urbino 18 electric =

Electric Polish articulated bus

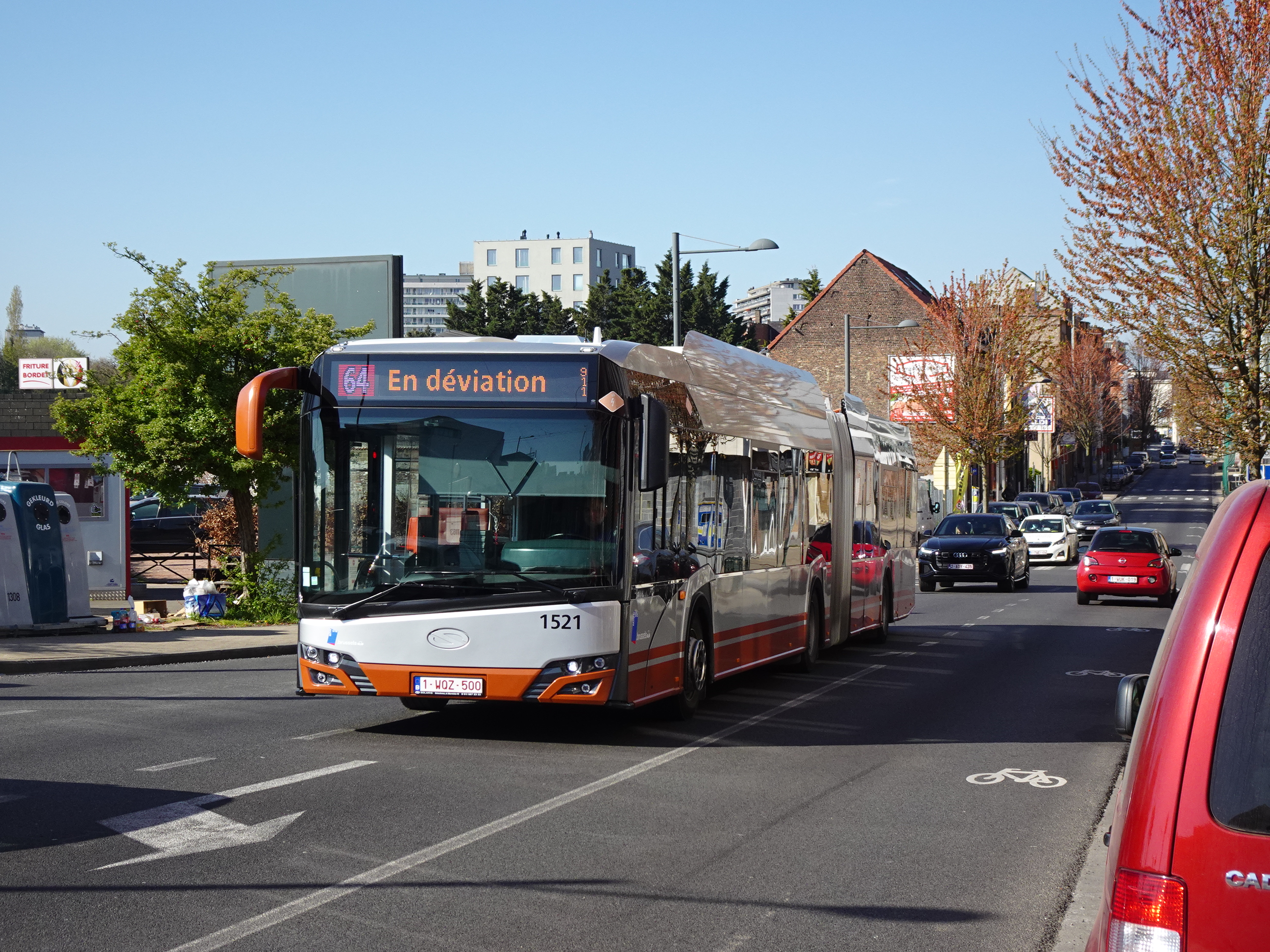

Overview
- Type: Low-floor articulated city bus
- Manufacturer: Solaris Bus & Coach
- Production: 2014–present
- Assembly: Bolechowo, Poland

Body and chassis
- Class: Single-deck city-bus
- Platform: Solaris Urbino
- Floor type: Low-floor

Powertrain
- Engine: Central asynchronous motor TSA TMF 35-44-4 (third and fourth generation); ZF AVE 130 motor (fourth generation) - optional
- Battery: Solaris High Power
- Plug-in charging: plug-in, pantograph, induction

Dimensions
- Wheelbase: 5,900 mm 6,000 mm
- Length: 18,000 mm 18,750 mm
- Width: 2,550 mm
- Height: 3,300 mm 3,480 mm

Solaris Urbino 18 electric (and the extended version Solaris Urbino 18,75 electric) is a low-floor, articulated city bus of the MEGA class, with an electric driveline, manufactured since 2014 by Polish producer Solaris Bus & Coach in Bolechowo-Osiedle near Poznań. It is a member of the Solaris Urbino city bus family.

== Origins ==
In 1999 Solaris unveiled its first city bus of the Urbino family – the Solaris Urbino 12. The articulated model Solaris Urbino 18 had its début the same year. In subsequent years the city bus range was broadened, as new models were added, initially these were conventionally fuelled vehicles. In 2002, Solaris presented a new version of the Urbino, the so-called 2nd generation. Two years later, in 2004, the third generation of the Urbino had its première. In 2006, at the IAA Nutzfahrzeuge trade fair in Hanover, Solaris Bus & Coach displayed a third generation bus which was also the first of its hybrid models, the Solaris Urbino 18 Hybrid created in collaboration with US firms Alisson Transmission and Cummins. It was the first serially produced hybrid bus in the world. As a result, Solaris joined European leaders of eco-friendly public transport technologies. Krzysztof Olszewski, founder of Solaris Bus & Coach, said at that time that: ”Diesel has died, long live electricity!”. The first fully electric bus, the Solaris Urbino 8,9 LE electric, was unveiled in 2012. Even though there were no electric vehicles of the Solaris brand before, this particular bus is part of the third generation Urbino family, because it served as the basis for this model. Initially, the range of the vehicle was merely, however, with time, thanks to technological progress, the achievable range increased. The vehicle was tested among others in Poznań, Kraków and Warsaw. The first buyer of that electric Solaris bus was an Austrian operator, from Klagenfurt. Vehicles of that type were also the first electric buses in Poland used by a public transport operator; in 2014, two of these buses made it to the city of Ostrołęka. 2012 saw the première of the electric city bus Solaris Urbino 12 electric which quickly became a bestseller, whereas its fourth generation version was crowned Bus of the Year 2017.

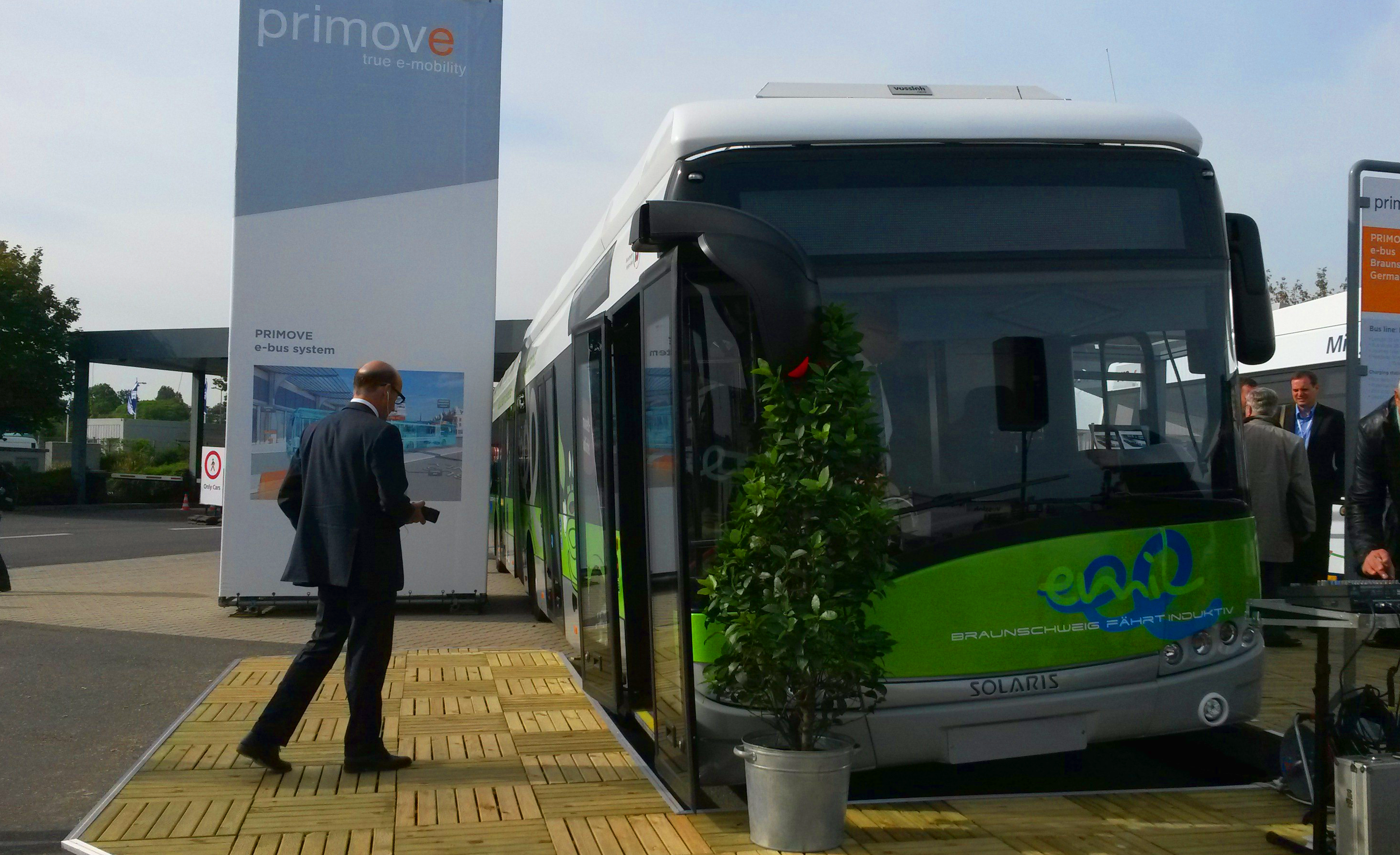
The Solaris Urbino 18 electric of the third generation, painted in the colours of the operator from Braunschweig

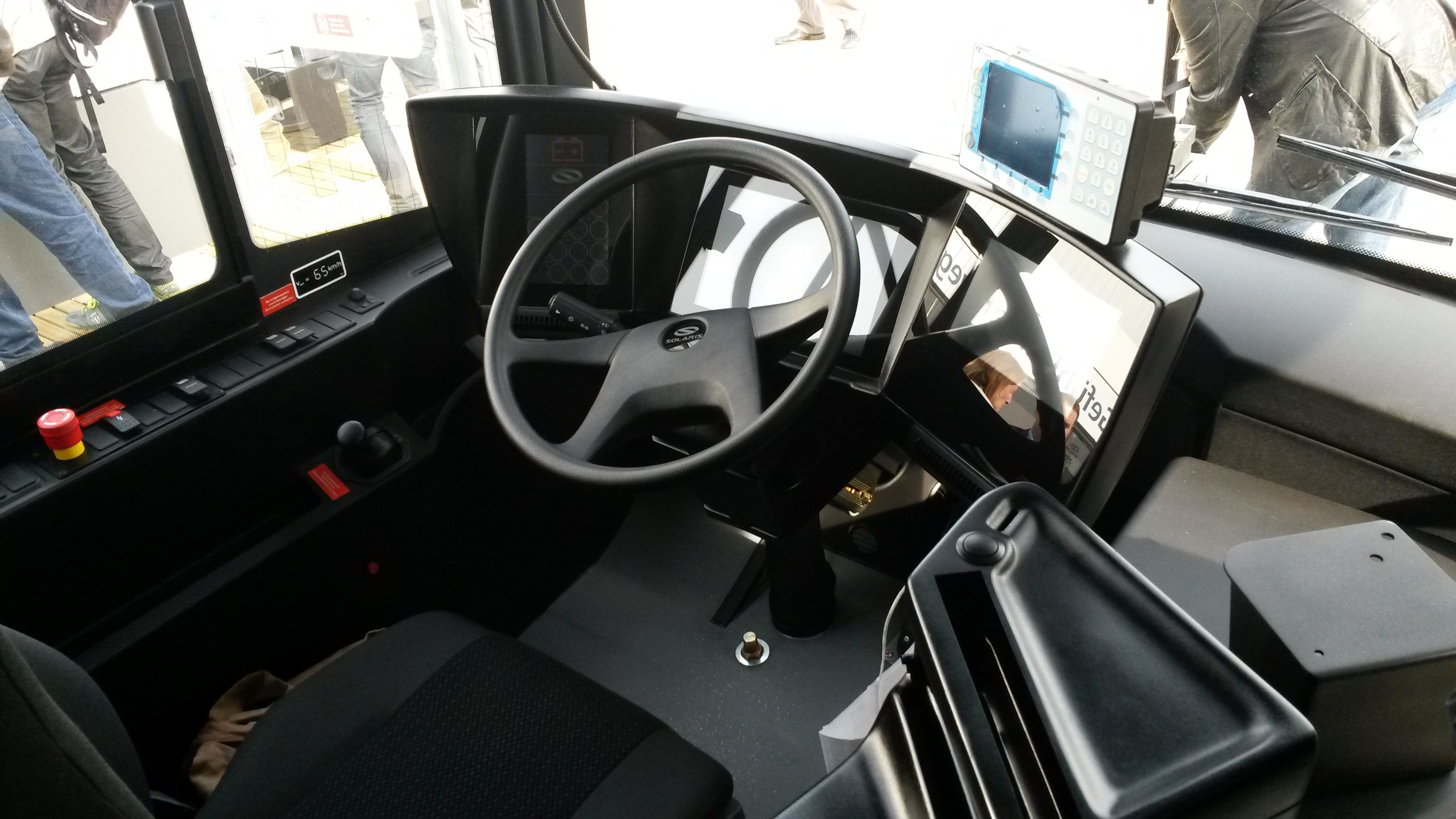
Driver's cabin with touch screen steering interface

== 3rd generation ==
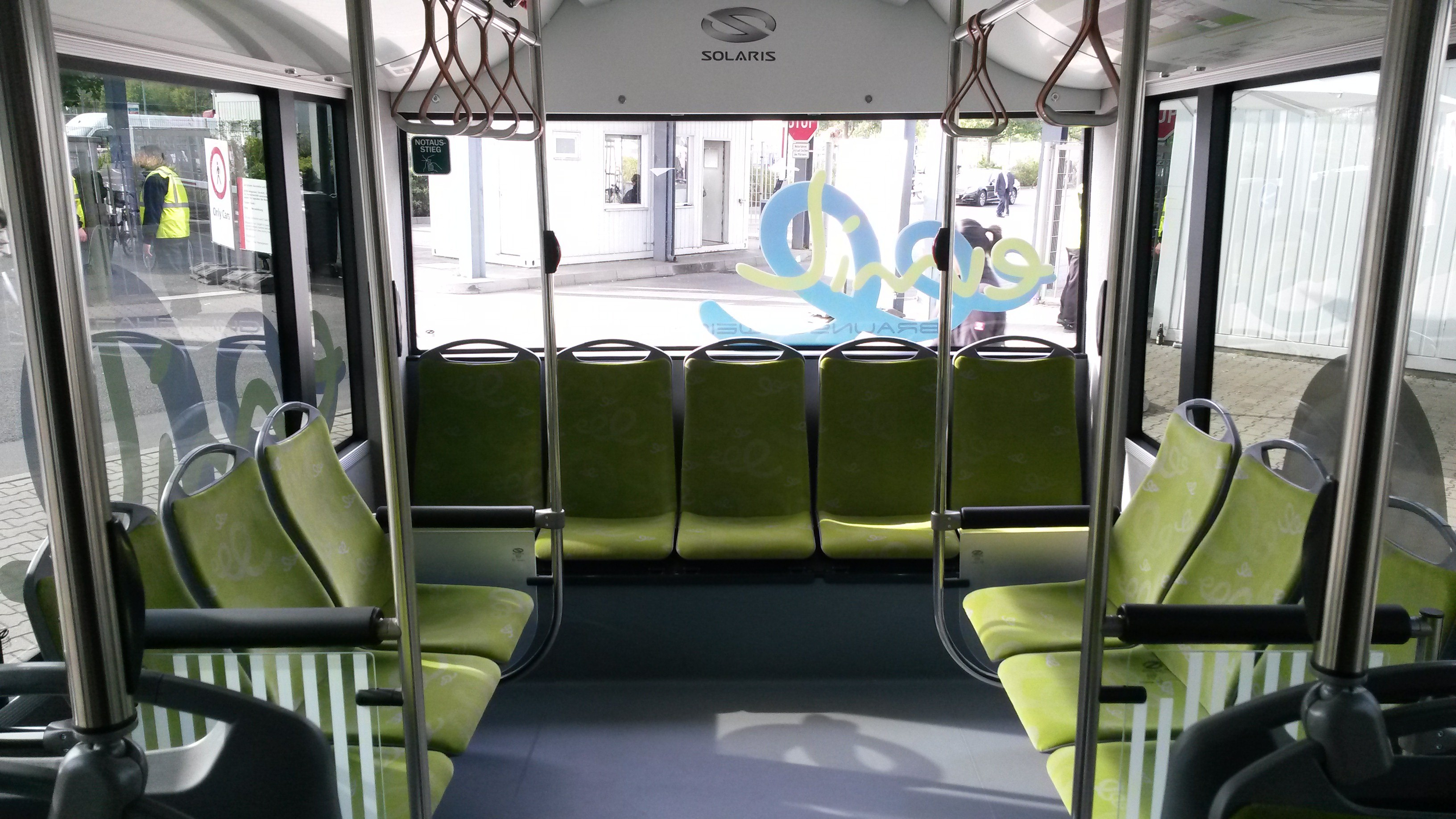
Rear part of bus. The application of an electric motor allowed to forgo a classic engine tower.

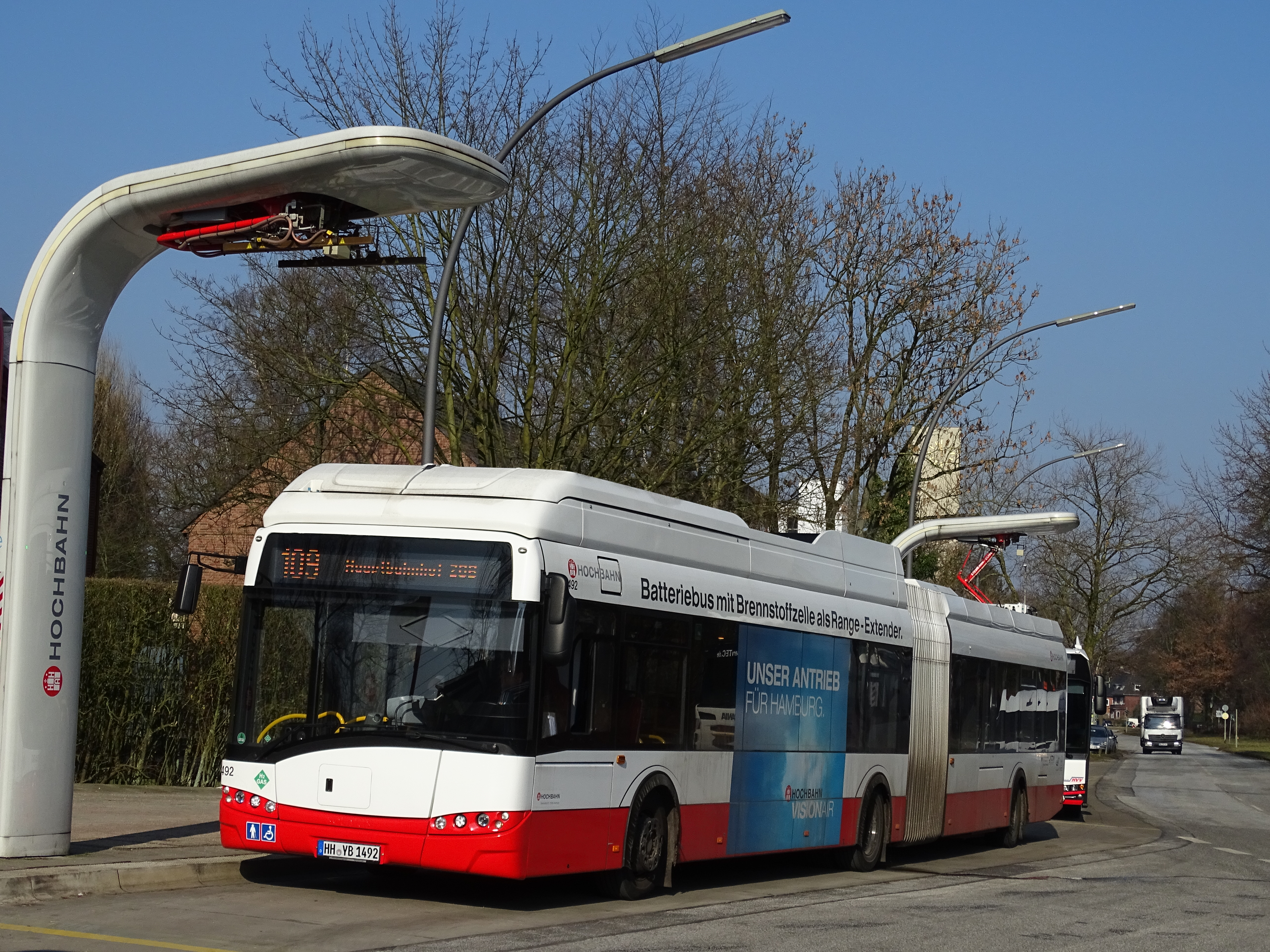
The Solaris Urbino 18,75 electric with a hydrogen fuel cell as range extender, on the streets of Hamburg

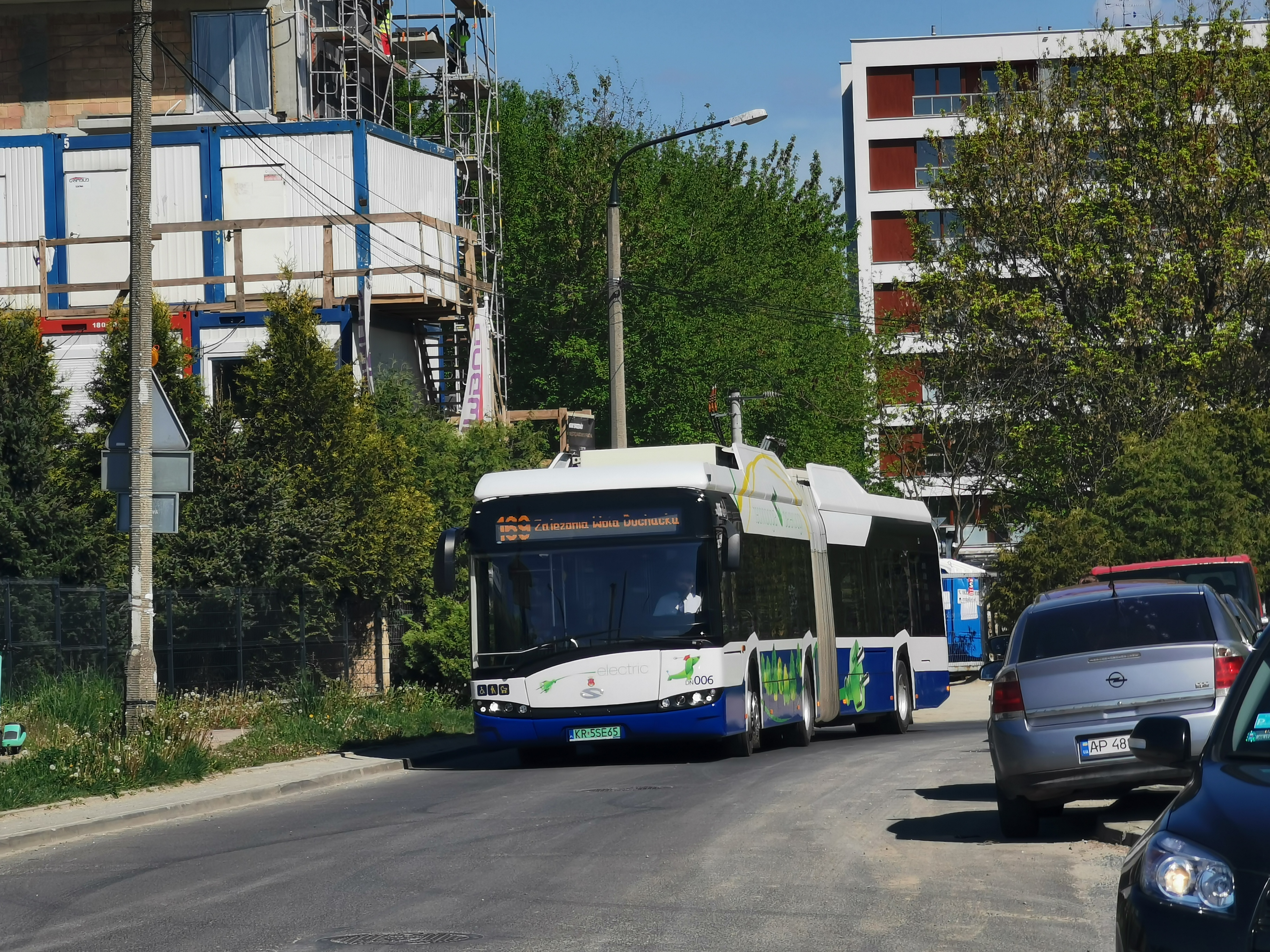
Solaris Urbino 18 electric of 3rd generation in Kraków

The articulated electric Solaris saw its premiere in September 2014 during the InnoTrans trade fair in Berlin. The first four buses (including the prototype) were earmarked for the public transport operator Braunschweiger Verkehrs-GmbH from the German city of Braunschweig, where they are tested together with a 12-metre electric Solaris. The vehicles feature the innovative inductive charging system Primove of Canadian manufacturer Bombardier. The 90 kWh lithium-ion traction batteries have been placed on the bus roof. The driveline consists of a central asynchronous motor with a power of 240 kW, located in the second section of the vehicle. The electric equipment was supplied by German firm Vossloh-Kiepe (now Kiepe Electric). The axles and steering system were provided by ZF Friedrichshafen. The driver has control over the state of charge of the battery and the operation of the driveline thanks to touch screens installed in the driver's cabin. Interior and external lighting of the vehicle was based on LED technology.

At the end of 2014, Solaris showed in Hamburg two elongated electric Urbino 18,75 buses featuring an electric driveline electric reinforced with a fuel cell. It was the first vehicle produced in Poland using hydrogen as an alternative fuel. The basic energy source are 120 kWh traction batteries placed in the tower in the rear part of the vehicle. These batteries are charged by means of charging stations in the bus depot and of a fuel cell with an effective power output of 85 kW. The fuel cell was made by Ballard. Thanks to this solution the battery lifetime has been extended, whereas the buses can cover up to 300 km every day, which is an unprecedented achievement for electric buses.

In October 2016, Solaris presented two Urbino 18 electric for public transport operator TMB from Barcelona. The vehicles were acquired under the European project of zero-emission public transport ZeEUS. The 125 kWh batteries are charged using a pantograph. Chargers were supplied by Polish firm Ekoenergetyka from Zielona Góra. The Barcelona buses can carry up to 110 passengers, including 37 passengers on seats. They have been assigned to service the bus line H19.

== The new Solaris Urbino (4th generation) ==
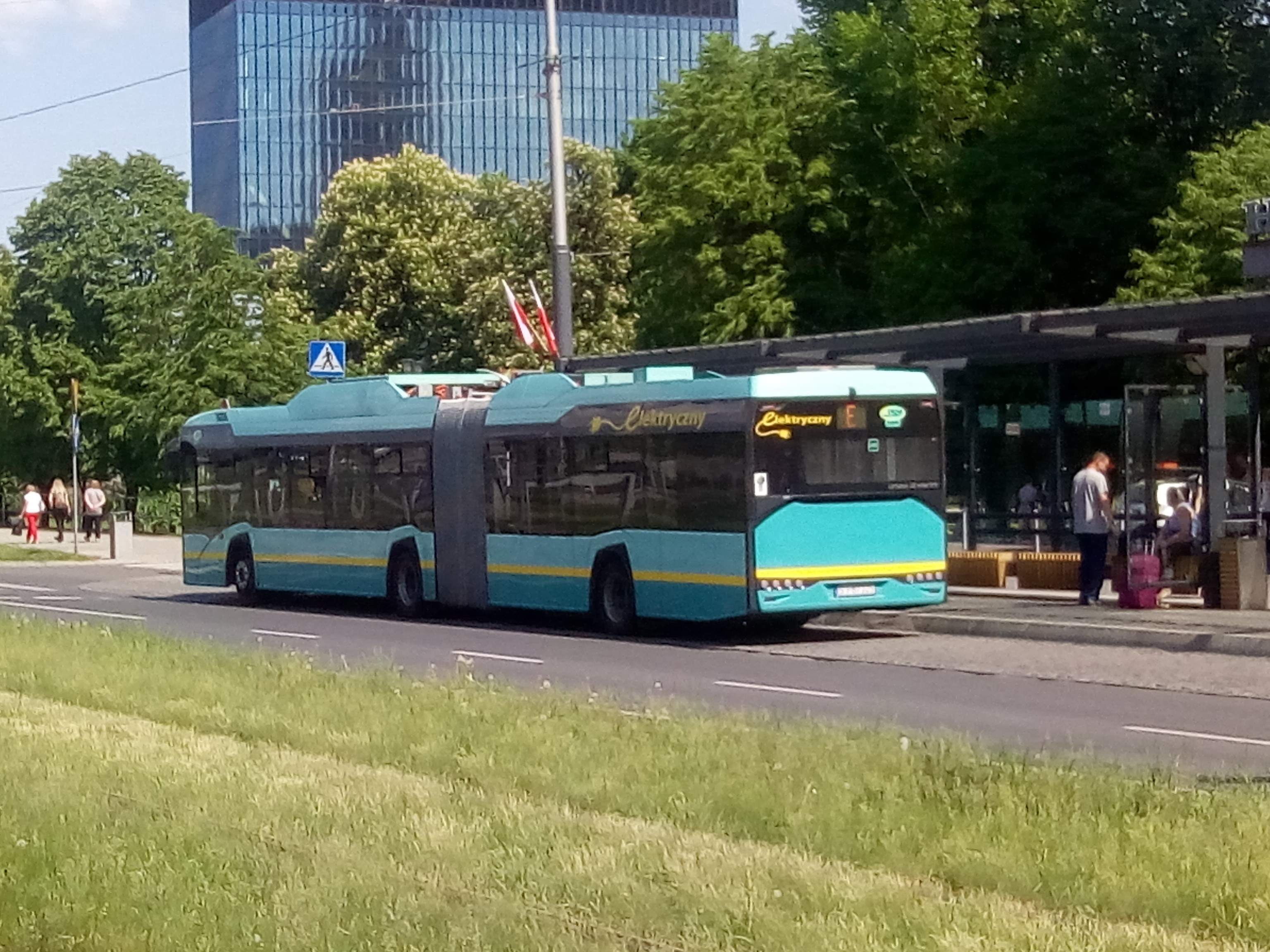
New generation Solaris Urbino 18 electric of public transport operator PKM Jaworzno

In 2014, Solaris showcased the Solaris Urbino 18 of the new (fourth) generation, though still with a conventional driveline. Then in 2015, Solaris presented the 12-metre version of the new generation electric bus, whereas the new Solaris Urbino 18 electric premièred at the Busworld trade fair in the Belgian city of Kortrijk in autumn 2017. Most structural solutions were taken over from the diesel equivalent of the articulated model or the electric models of the previous generation. The vehicle is propelled by a 240 kW central traction motor. Both plug-in or pantograph recharging can be applied to the batteries of the “Solaris High Energy” or the “Solaris High Power”, each with a capacity adjusted to user needs. Depending on the interior layout, the bus can carry up to 135 passengers.

Solaris scored orders for the first new-generation articulated buses with alternative drives already in the middle of 2016. Three vehicles, together with 17 MAXI class buses, were commissioned by public transport operator MPK Kraków. Solaris had been the sole bidder. A month later Solaris secured orders for nine articulated electric buses to be delivered to operator PKM Jaworzno^{[11]}. The manufacturer offered new generation vehicles in both calls for tenders.

The first pictures of the Urbino 18 electric during assembly were released in January 2017. Back then it was announced that the bus would head to Warsaw for three-year test runs for operator MZA Warszawa. In August 2017, the first three articulated electric buses drove out onto Kraków streets for a preview before the official première. It is worth noting that one of these buses was the 15,000th vehicle made by the manufacturer. In September 2017, the first vehicle of this type to be produced was released for test rides in Poznań. In November, right after the official début at the Busworld trade fair, the vehicle ended up in Warsaw. It was lent to operator MZA for a three-year test period. In the same month, nine new Urbino 18 electric were delivered to Jaworzno.

December 2017 saw the opening of bids submitted in a call for tender for five articulated electric buses for public transport operator PKM Katowice. Solaris placed the only bid in this tender, and went on to win the order. The delivery of the buses was planned for the turn of 2018 and 2019. Solaris has also won a large tender for the supply of electric buses for Belgian public transport provider STIB – pursuant to the contract, Solaris is to deliver 25 Urbino 18 electric buses to Brussels in 2019.

== Operators ==
Country	City	Operator	Number of vehicles	Production year	Notes
Poland (18/33)	Jaworzno	PKM	9	2017	
Poland (18/33)	Kraków	MPK	3	2017	
Poland (18/33)	Warsaw	MZA	1	2017	Test bus belonging to Solaris Bus & Coach, test run due to last until 2020
Poland (18/33)	Katowice	PKM	5	2019	
Poland (18/33)	Poznań	MPK	0/15	2019	
Germany (23)	Hamburg	Hochbahn	2	2014	Urbino 18,75 electric with fuel cell as range extender
Germany (23)	Braunschweig	Braunschweiger Verkehrs-GmbH	4	2013	First, prototype Urbino 18 electric
Germany (23)	Berlin	Berliner Verkehrsbetriebe (BVG)	17	2020	
Germany (23)	Dortmund	Dortmunder Stadtwerke	30	2022	
Spain (5)	Barcelona	TMB	5	2016, 2018	
Belgium (25)	City of Brussels	STIB	25	2019	
Luxemburg (3)	Bascharage	Sales-Lentz	3	2019	
Romania (16)	Craiova	RAT SRL	16	2020, 2021	
