= Solaris Urbino 15 LE =

Polish 6-wheel bus series since 2008

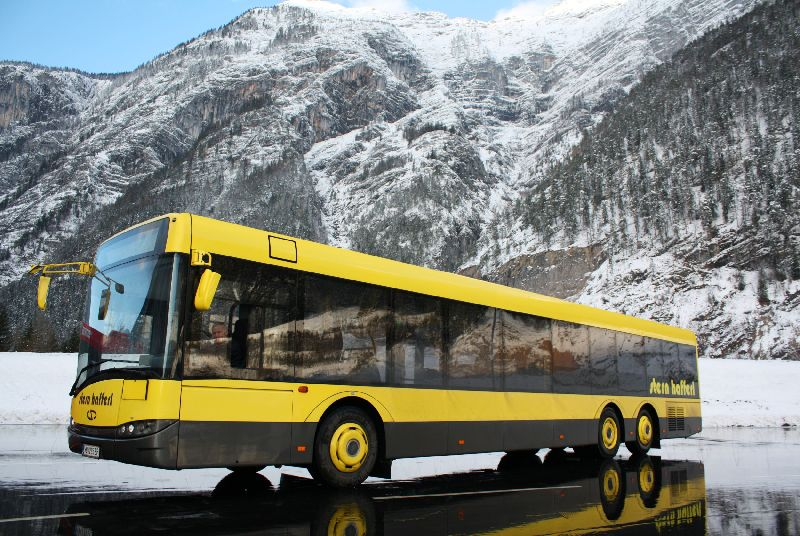

Overview
- Manufacturer: Solaris Bus & Coach
- Production: 2008–present
- Assembly: Bolechowo, Poland

Body and chassis
- Class: Single-deck city bus
- Doors: 2
- Floor type: Low entry

Powertrain
- Engine: DAF PR 265; DAF PR228 (optional)
- Capacity: 118
- Power output: 265 kW (360 KM); 228 kW (310 KM)
- Transmission: Voith Diwa.5 – 864.5; ZF 6HP ECOMAT 4 (optional) ZF Ecolife 6AP1600BS

Dimensions
- Length: 14590 mm
- Width: 2550 mm
- Height: 3000 mm 3200 mm (with air conditioning)
- Curb weight: 24000 kg

Solaris Urbino 15 LE is a series of low-entry buses from the Solaris Urbino series, designed for transport, produced since 2008 by the Polish company Solaris Bus & Coach in Bolechowo near Poznań. In 2010 the company began manufacturing the bus with the engine powered by CNG.

== History ==
Solaris Urbino 15 LE was put into production since the spring of 2008. It was based on a model of the Solaris Urbino 15 which was built to be used primarily for Alpine and Scandinavian countries. The bus is also popular in the Czech Republic and Slovakia. The first customer, who contributed to production of the model by placing an order for three types of low-entry buses, is a Ledermair company in the city Schwaz, Austria. The first official information about the bus, including photographs, appeared in June 2008 during the AUTOTEC Trade Fair in Brno, that is, after the delivery to Austria. The official debut took place at IAA Nutzfahrzeuge Trade Fair in Hannover and the Transexpo Trade Fair in Kielce in autumn in 2008. It is one of the few buses with a length of 15 metres produced in Europe and the world.

Thanks to the high floor in the rear of the vehicle, the engine and gearbox are placed in the centre for the third axle. It works with the SCR technology using AdBlue. All axles are from ZF. Due to the use of larger wheel size 295/70 tires the bus has an extended wheel arch. Behind the front axle there is a storage possibly for snow chains. Two illuminated steps provide access to the higher floor level at the rear. All seats are located on the raised floor and are equipped with safety belts, while those located on the side of the stairs have additional armrests and handles. Above the seats in the low floor part of the bus there are shelves for luggage on the ceiling. The higher door has wheelchair access. Optionally, in place of the wheelchair bay the space can be transformed for four additional passenger seats. The ventilation of the interior of the bus has side windows and two electric sunroofs. Instead of tilting windows there can be installed an air conditioning system. There are several versions of the cab: open (open door), semi-closed (with glass door) and closed (fully built cabin). Doors used in Solaris Urbino 15 LE all open to the outside.
