= Solaris Urbino 12 hydrogen =

Low-floor bus from the Solaris Urbino family

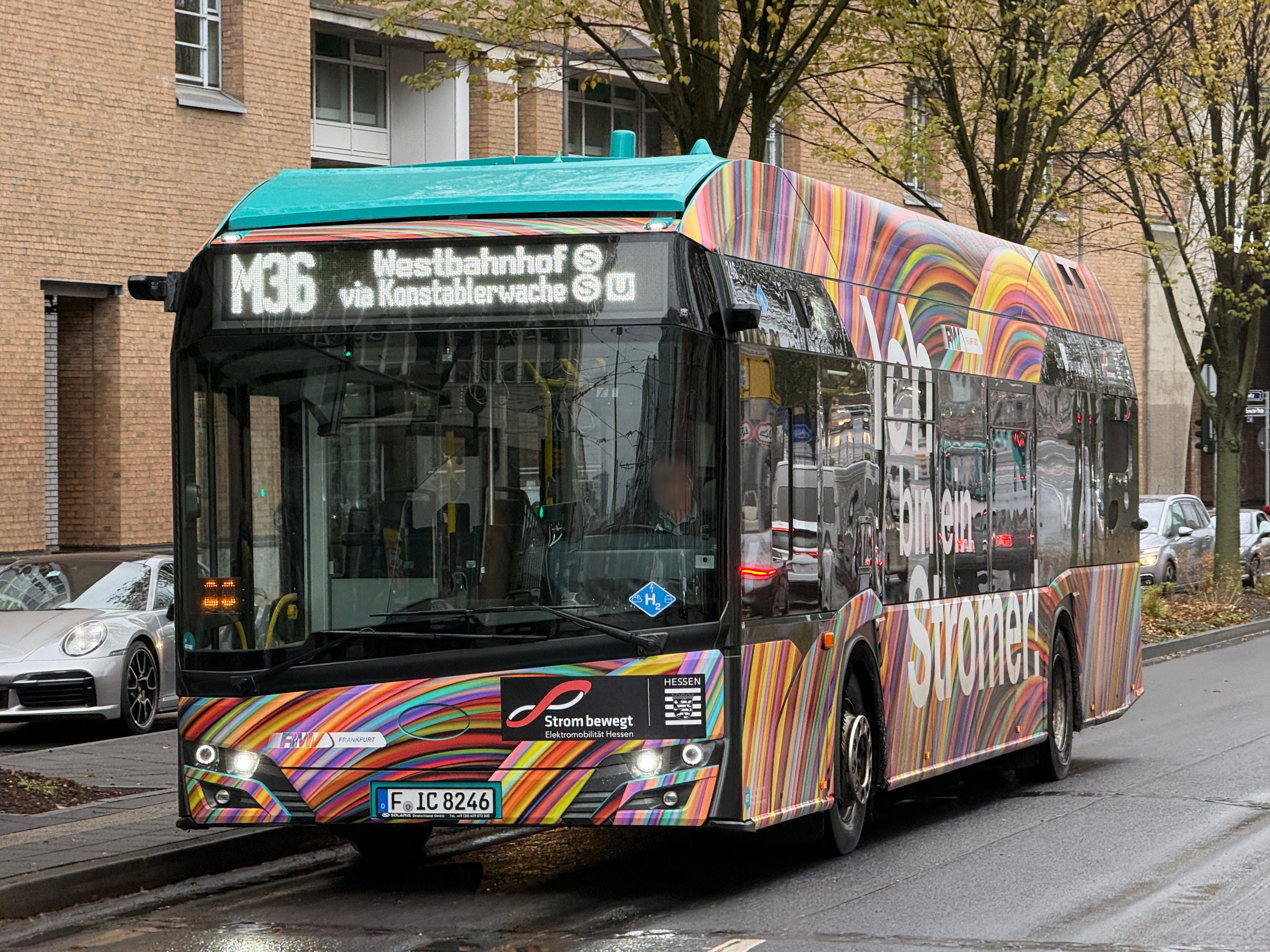
- Prototype Urbino 12 hydrogen

Overview
- Manufacturer: Solaris Bus & Coach
- Production: 2020–present
- Assembly: (Poland) Bolechowo-Osiedle

Body and chassis
- Body style: Low-floor transit bus MAXI class
- Doors: 2 or 3

Powertrain
- Engine: Electric motor integrated in the rear axle ZF AVE110

Dimensions
- Wheelbase: 590 mm (23 in)
- Length: 12,000 mm (470 in)
- Width: 2,550 mm (100 in)
- Height: 3,300 mm (130 in)

The Solaris Urbino 12 hydrogen is a low-floor bus in the urban MAXI class from the Solaris Urbino family, manufactured by Solaris Bus & Coach. It is powered by electricity generated from hydrogen fuel cells. Unveiled in 2019, it builds on the Solaris Urbino 12 and its electric variant, the Solaris Urbino 12 electric.

== History ==
=== Background ===
Solaris Bus & Coach began producing city buses under its own brand in 1999, launching the Solaris Urbino family. In 2001, it introduced its first electric-powered vehicle, the trolleybus Solaris Trollino 12. In 2004, Solaris unveiled a low-emission bus powered by CNG, followed in 2006 by the world's first serially produced hybrid city bus, the Solaris Urbino 18 Hybrid. Hybrid buses in the MAXI class were later added to the lineup. In 2011, Solaris presented the fully electric MIDI-class urban bus Solaris Urbino 8,9 LE electric, followed by 12-meter and 18-meter electric buses in 2013 and 2014, respectively. The Solaris Urbino 12 electric became the first electric bus to win the Bus & Coach of the Year title in 2017. By 2018, Solaris was Europe's second-largest electric bus manufacturer, holding a 14% market share.

The first Solaris urban bus using electricity from hydrogen fuel cells was delivered in 2014 under a contract for two Urbino 18,75 electric buses for Hochbahn Hamburg. This technology enabled a daily range of up to 300 km, unachievable by battery-only electric buses without midday recharging. In 2018, Solaris supplied trolleybuses, Trollino 18,75, to Riga's municipal operator. Equipped with fuel cells, these vehicles could travel up to 100 km without overhead lines, emitting no exhaust and eliminating the need for bulky energy storage batteries.

=== Urbino 12 hydrogen ===
In June 2018, Solaris announced plans to unveil the hydrogen-powered Solaris Urbino 12 hydrogen in 2019. Before its debut, the Urbino 12 hydrogen received the Concept Vehicle award from the German magazine Busplaner. In April 2019, the bus was pre-released for testing at the depot in Piła. In May 2019, Solaris secured its first order for 10 Urbino 12 hydrogen buses, with an option for two more, for Bolzano, Italy, to be delivered in 2020. The bus officially premiered in June 2019 at the International Association of Public Transport exhibition in Stockholm, with plans announced for a 10-week trial by RATP Group in Paris. The Paris trials took place in 2020. In August 2019, the prototype bus underwent its first passenger trials with Postbus in Graz, Austria. In 2021, RVK in Köln, Germany, became the first operator to receive Solaris Urbino 12 hydrogen buses.

In 2022, Solaris introduced a second hydrogen-powered model, the Urbino 18 hydrogen.

== Design and technical specifications ==
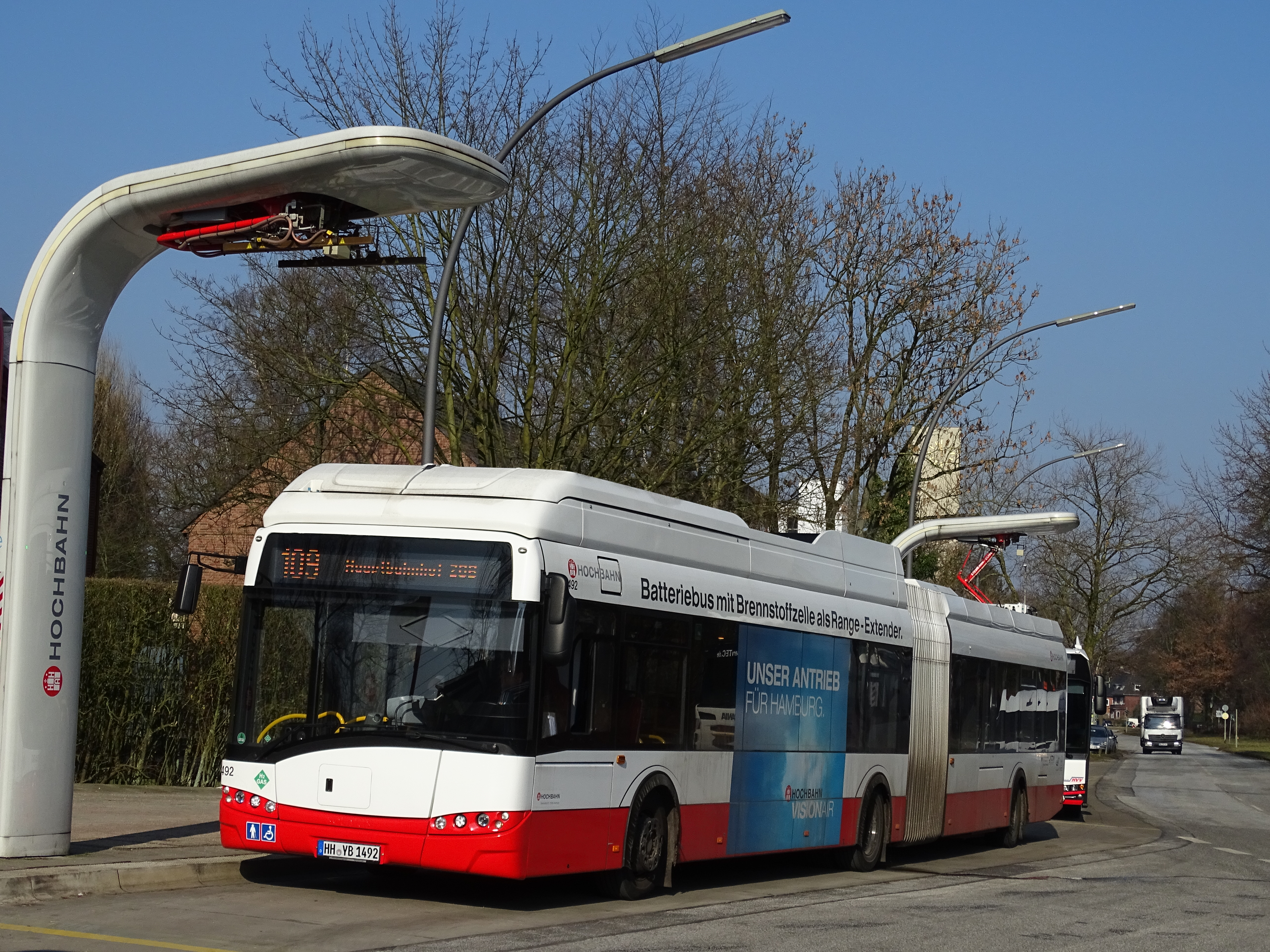
Solaris Urbino 18,75 electric in Hamburg

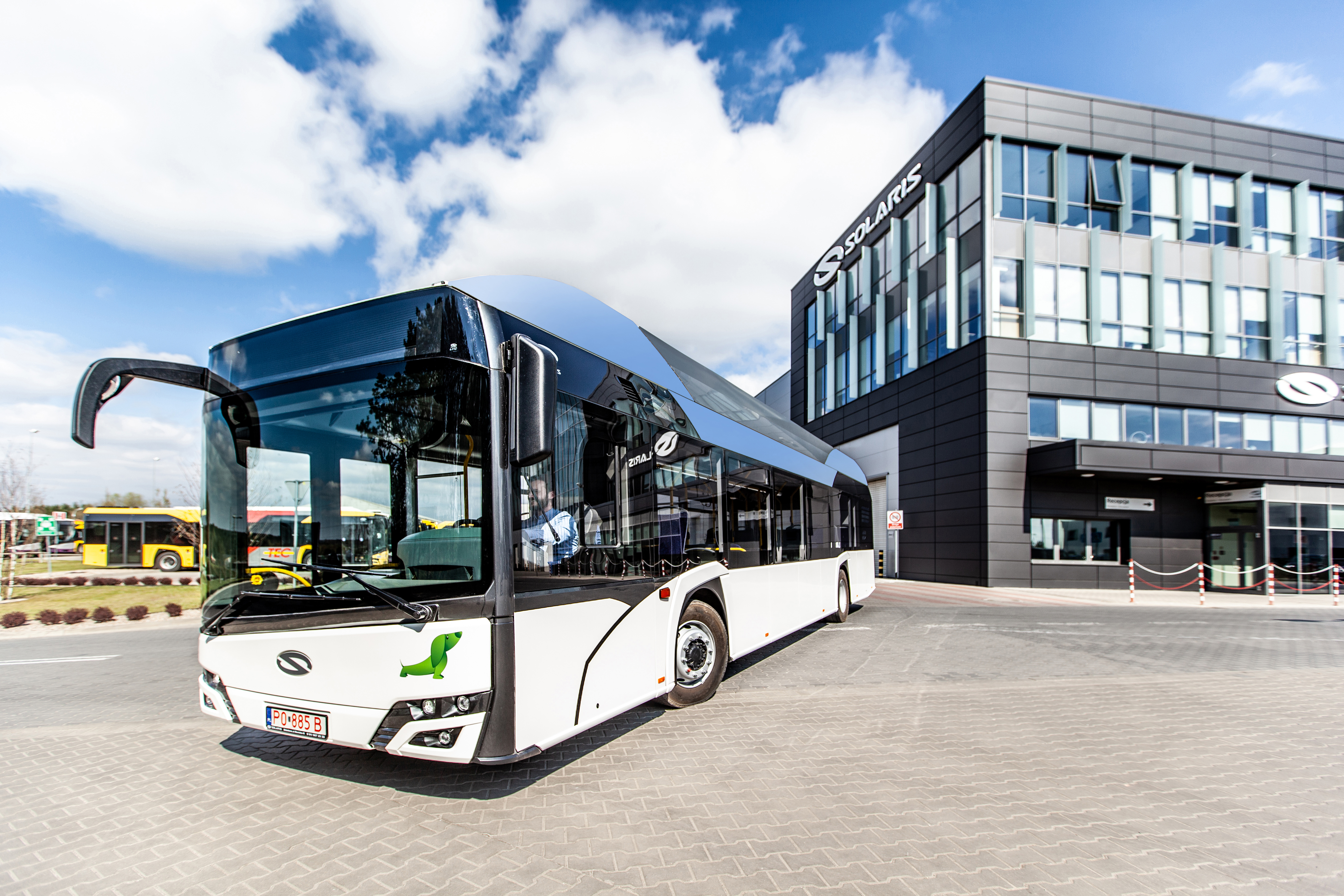
Prototype Urbino 12 hydrogen

Technical specifications of Solaris Urbino 12 hydrogen (as of 2019)
Dimensions and basic data
Length	12,000 mm
Width	2,550 mm
Height	3,300 mm
Front/rear overhang	2,700 mm / 3,400 mm
Wheelbase	5,900 mm
Approach/departure angle	7° / 7°
Entry height above ground	350 mm
Drivetrain
Fuel cell	60 kW fuel cell
Electric motor	Asynchronous motor in ZF AVE110 axle (2 × 110 kW)
Hydrogen tanks	Five 312 L composite tanks on the roof
Traction batteries	Lithium-ion "Solaris High Power" (29.2 kWh), with plug-in charging
Chassis and running gear
Front axle	ZF independent or rigid (optional)
Rear (drive) axle	ZF with electric motors
Lubrication system	Central lubrication point for solid or semi-fluid grease (optional)
Steering system	ZF Servocom
Brakes	EBS, ABS, ASR, handbrake, bus stop brake; ESC optional
Body and interior
Frame	Stainless steel
Door layout	1-2-2; 2-2-2; 1-2-0; 2-2-0
Door width	1,250 mm
Seating capacity	Up to 37+1
Electrical system	Based on CAN bus

=== Drivetrain ===
The Solaris Urbino 12 hydrogen is a zero-emission vehicle. Hydrogen, the primary power source, is stored in composite tanks above the front axle, holding up to 37.5 kg. The hydrogen feeds a 60 kW fuel cell, where the reaction of hydrogen with oxygen generates electricity stored in 29.2 kWh lithium-ion "Solaris High Power" batteries. The batteries can also be charged via a plug-in connector. The batteries supply electricity to the motors, supporting the fuel cell during peak power demands. The vehicle is powered by a ZF electric drive axle with 2 × 110 kW output. This configuration allows the Urbino 12 hydrogen to travel up to 350 km on a single refueling, consuming approximately 9 kg of hydrogen per 100 km, a range unattainable by battery-only buses without midday charging. The only byproducts of the fuel cell reaction are water vapor and heat, which can be used for bus heating.

=== Chassis ===
The chassis is based on the fourth-generation Solaris Urbino 12 electric. The front axle is an independent or optional rigid ZF unit, while the rear drive axle is a ZF AVE110. Like other Solaris Urbino models, the bus features an ECAS suspension with kneeling (70 mm) and raising (60 mm) functions. The steering system is a ZF Servocom. Safety systems include ABS, EBS, ASR, optional ESC, a bus stop brake, and a handbrake.

=== Body and interior ===
The bus frame is made of corrosion-resistant stainless steel, with removable side and front panels. Its interior and exterior design draws directly from the fourth-generation Solaris Urbino, updated with a 2018 facelift. Access is via two or three double-leaf doors (with optional single-leaf first doors) measuring 1,250 mm wide. A manual or electric ramp for disabled passengers is installed at the second door, opposite a space for wheelchairs or strollers. The bus is fully low-floor with no transverse steps in the passenger area. It can accommodate up to 37+1 seats, depending on the operator's configuration. Optional air conditioning is available for the passenger area and driver's cabin. Heating uses a CO_{2} heat pump, leveraging heat from the fuel cell to extend range while maintaining zero emissions, eliminating the need for electric or oil-based heating used in battery buses.

== Operations ==
Country	City	Operator	Units	Delivery years	Source
Austria	Villach	Postbus	0 of 5	2022	
France	Paris (Créteil)	RATP	19 of 22	2025-	
Czech Republic	Ústí nad Labem	DP	0 (20)	2023–2030	
Netherlands	Regions Hoeksche Waard and Goeree-Overflakkee	Connexxion	23	2021	
Netherlands	Zutphen, Apeldoorn, Achterhoek region	Arriva	10	2021	
Germany	Köln	RVK	15	2021	
Germany	Wuppertal	WSW Mobil	10	2021	
Poland	Konin	Municipal Transport Company in Konin	1	2022	
Poland	Lublin	Road and Municipal Transport Authority in Lublin	1	2023	
Poland	Poznań	Municipal Transport Company in Poznań	25	2023	
Poland	Wałbrzych	Public Transport in Wałbrzych	0 of 20	2024–2025	
Slovakia	Bratislava	DP	4 of 40	2023	
Sweden	Sandviken	Transdev	2	2021	
Italy	Bolzano	SASA	12	2021	
Italy	Bologna	Tper	120	2025	
Italy	Ferrara	Tper	10	2025	

The first operator to test the Solaris Urbino 12 hydrogen was Municipal Transport Company in Piła, where the bus underwent pre-release trials. The first passenger trials occurred with Postbus in Graz. The bus was also tested for 10 weeks by RATP Group in Paris. The first operator to purchase the Urbino 12 hydrogen was SASA in Bolzano, ordering 10 units with an option for two more. Subsequent orders came from municipal operators in Wuppertal (10 units) and Köln (15 units), with deliveries starting in March 2021. In Poland, Municipal Transport Company in Konin became the first to operate hydrogen buses, leasing one Urbino 12 hydrogen in 2022.

== Awards ==
- 2019 Sustainability Award by Busplaner magazine in the Concept Vehicle category.
