= Solaris Urbino 8,9 LE electric =

Small polish electric bus

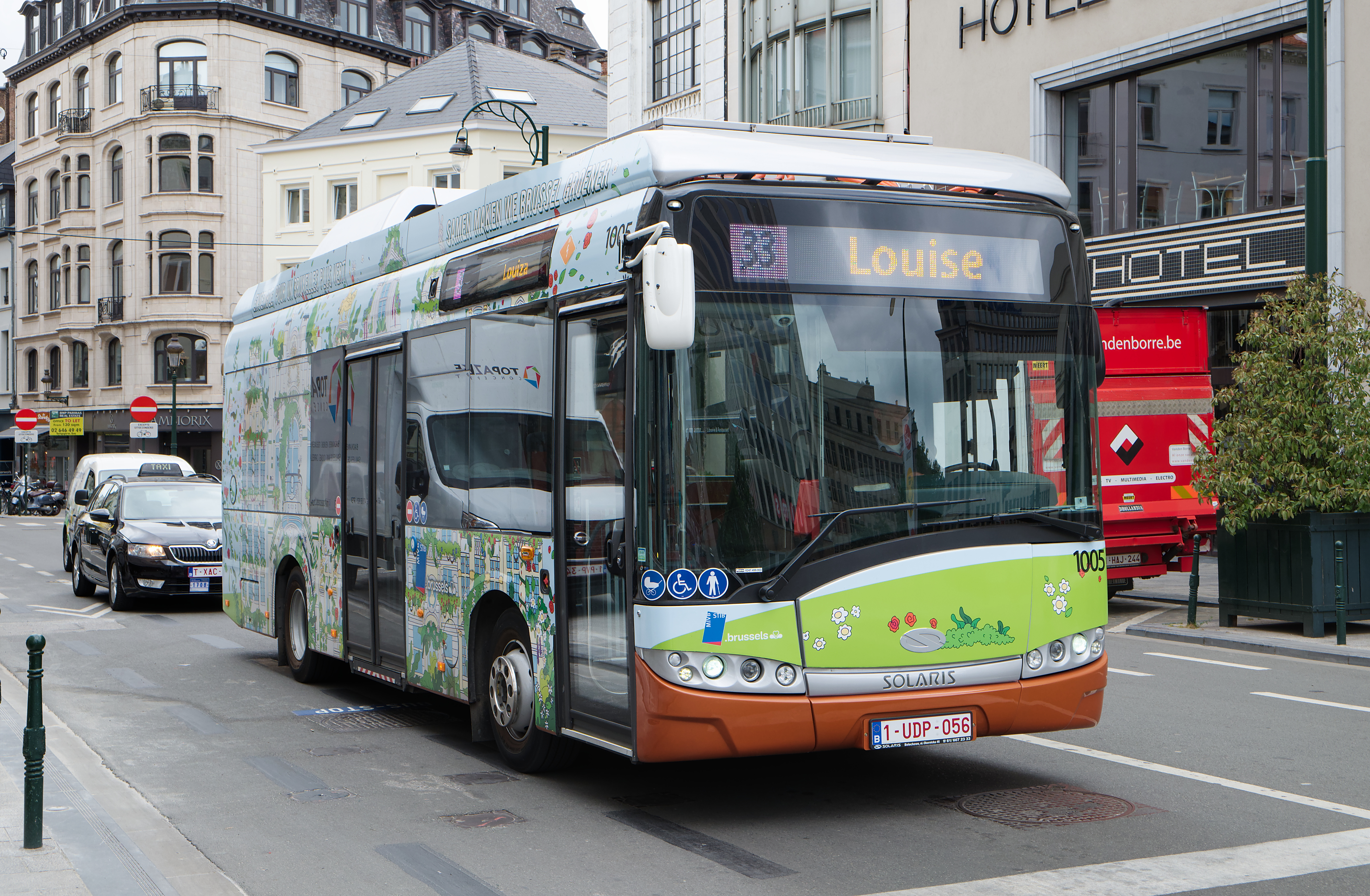
- Solaris Urbino 8,9 LE electric operated by STIB/MIVB in Brussels

Overview
- Manufacturer: Solaris Bus & Coach
- Production: 2013-present
- Assembly: Bolechowo, Poland

Body and chassis
- Class: Single-deck city-bus
- Doors: 2
- Floor type: Low entry

Powertrain
- Engine: Vossloh Kiepe Electric
- Capacity: 21-29 seats
- Power output: 120 kW (163 HP)

Dimensions
- Wheelbase: 4380 mm
- Length: 8950 mm
- Width: 2400 mm
- Height: 3250 mm

Solaris Urbino 8,9 LE electric is a low-entry electric city bus, that debuted in autumn 2011. It was produced by the company Solaris Bus & Coach S.A. from Bolechowo near Poznań. Its design is based on the Solaris Urbino 8,9 LE. It was the first electric bus manufactured in Poland. In Poland, it is in use in Ostrołęka, Kraków, Jaworzno, Ciechanów, Chodzież, Września, Katowice and Stalowa Wola.

== History ==
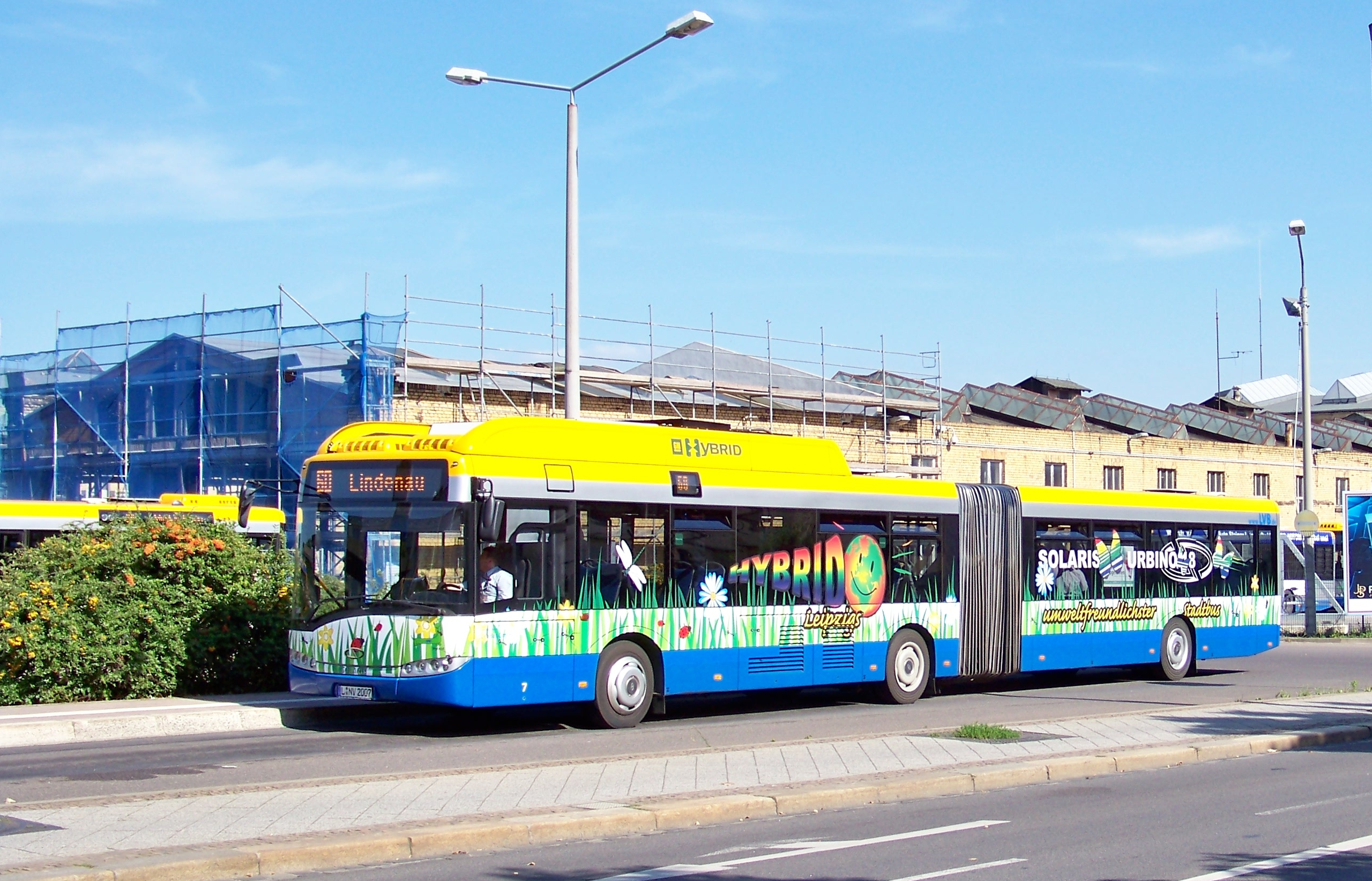
Solaris Urbino 18 Hybrid

=== Origins ===
In 1999 Solaris unveiled its first city bus of the Urbino family – the Solaris Urbino 12. In subsequent years the manufacturer widened the city bus range, adding new models which, initially, were conventionally fuelled. In 2002, Solaris showed a new version of the Urbino, the so-called 2nd generation. Two years later, in 2004, the third generation of the Urbino had its première. In 2006, at the IAA Nutzfahrzeuge trade fair in Hanover, Solaris Bus & Coach S.A. displayed a third generation bus which was also the first of its hybrid models, the Solaris Urbino 18 hybrid. It was the first serially produced hybrid bus in Europe. As a result, Solaris joined the European leaders of eco-friendly technology in public transport. Krzysztof Olszewski, founder of Solaris Bus & Coach, said at that time that: ”Diesel has died, long live electricity!”. In 2008, Solaris showcased the Urbino 8,9 LE model which later served as the base for the Urbino 8,9 LE electric.

A green dachshund, the trademark of Solaris, with a cable and plug instead of a tail, became the graphic symbol of the Urbino electric.

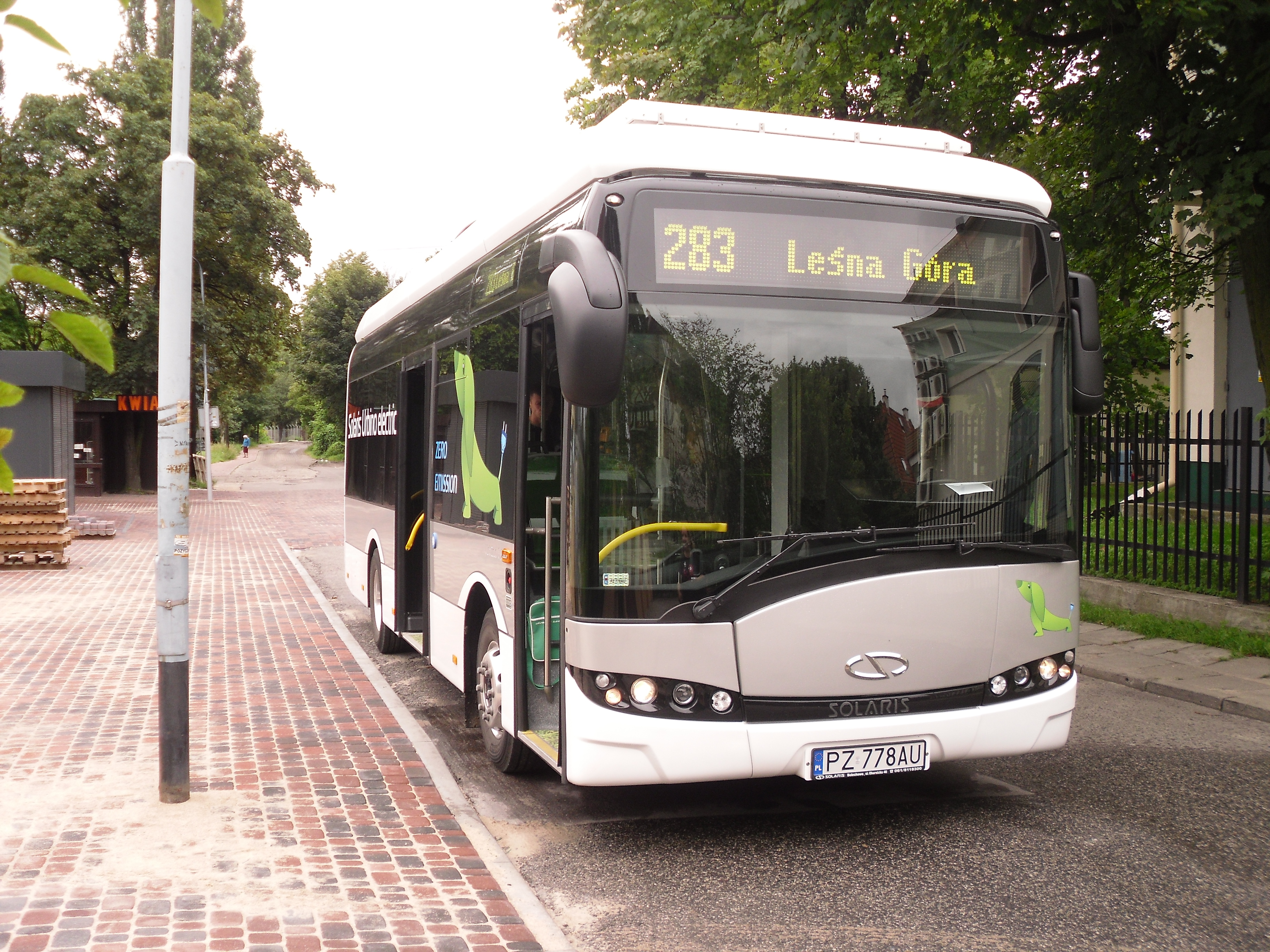
Solaris Urbino 8,9 LE electric during test rides in Gdańsk

=== Urbino 8,9 LE electric ===
The prototype Solaris Urbino 8,9 LE electric had its début on 20 September 2011, during the Transexpo 2011 fair. The vehicle design was based on the Urbino 8,9 LE. The vehicle was equipped with a 120 kW 4-pole asynchronous electric motor. Traction batteries with a capacity of 124 kWh were placed in the engine chamber in the high-floor part of the bus deck. The battery weight of 1400 kg forced the designers to reduce the weight of the vehicle, which was achieved, among others, thanks to the application of lighter materials for the side panels (carbon fibre), thinner windows, or aluminium rims. It was the first electric bus manufactured in Poland. The chief advantages of a bus powered by electricity are, i.a. the lack of noxious emissions, which means the protection of the natural environment, as well as a low noise emission, but also a high efficiency of the electric drive and lower operating costs in connection with the lower price of electric power needed to cover the same distance as a conventionally powered vehicle.

In the first half of 2012, the producer built the second prototype with more elaborate equipment (such as air conditioning). It was fitted with a fast-charging system, using special chargers, that facilitated a full recharge of depleted batteries in a matter of 1.5 hours. This allowed to extend the range achieved on a single charging session to over 150 km. During the first tests of the electric bus, which took place in the first half of 2012 in Poznań, the bus covered over 3000 km failure-free. Later on, the same prototype was tested also in other Polish cities – in Warsaw, Kraków and Jaworzno (see section: Operators). During tests held in Zakopane, the Urbino electric 8,9 LE carried passengers on the route leading up to the mountain lake Morskie Oko. Meanwhile, in Poznań the bus was covered in artificial grass and it transported football fans who visited the city during the UEFA EURO football cup in June 2012.

== Awards ==
The innovation of the Solaris Urbino electric concept was appreciated and awarded by automotive industry experts. Readers of German magazine “Busplaner” declared the vehicle the “Innovation of 2012” in the Public Transport category. Meanwhile, the jury at the Transexpo trade fair awarded it the Golden Medal for product of the year 2011. Five years later, the twelve-metre electric bus of Solaris won the prestigious award of “Bus of the Years 2017”.

== Technical data ==
Technical data of the Urbino 8,9 LE electric (status for 2018)
Length	8950 mm
Width	2400 mm
Height	2850–3350 mm (depending on the bodywork)
Wheelbase	4380 mm
Front/Rear overhang	2080 mm 2490 mm
Front axle	Independent axle ZF
Rear drive axle	DANA axle
Steering system	ZF Servocom
Levelling system	ECAS suspension, kneeling height ca. 70 mm, raising to ca. 60 mm
Brake system	EBS, ABS, ASR, hand brake, bus stop brake
Electric motor	asynchronous motor of 120/160 kW
Battery	Lithium-ion battery; capacity dependent on customer requirements
Charging	pantograph or plug-in
Electric fittings	Based on CAN bus
Doors	1-2-0 or 1-1-0 (width of first door: 850 mm, second door: 1350 mm); entrance height: 320 mm
Number of seats	max. 27 (depending on interior layout)

=== Powertrain and batteries ===
The Solaris Urbino 8,9 LE electric has been fitted with an electric drive, the core element of which is a four-pole asynchronous motor boasting a maximum power of 160 kW and a maximum torque of 1400 Nm. In the prototype bus, the motor is fed with power that is stored in two liquid-cooled lithium batteries with a total capacity of 124 kWh and a rated voltage of 600 V, supplied by Polish firm Wamtechnik. The capacity of the battery in this, as well as in other models of that bus, depends on customer requirements and the particular nature of the bus line the vehicles are used on. The charging of two batteries weighing a total of 1400 kg at a charging terminal of 3x400 V 63 A takes at the most four hours and involves a plug-in connection or (optionally) a bus roof-mounted pantograph. Recharging is also possible en route thanks to energy recuperation during braking. The maximum driving range of the first buses spanned 100 to 150 km, whereas the maximum speed of the vehicle totalled 50 km/h. The distance they are able to cover on a single charging session depends on the capacity of the battery selected by the customer. The drivetrain consists of a ZF RL55-type independent front suspension and rear axle DANA G150, which are set on air bellows.

=== Bus body and interior ===
The body structure has been made of steel sections of increased corrosion resistance. Due to the large weight of the battery, it was necessary to reduce the vehicle weight. To make the outer panels of the bodywork, the manufacturer chose stainless steel and lightweight panels made from carbon fibre which has also been used for the rear engine chamber cover. Components with a reduced weight, such as thinner windows, lighter seats, a mahogany floor (instead of a plywood one), foamed ACM for air feed ducts and aluminium rims, have been used in the Urbino 8,9 LE electric for the final touch. In order to reduce power consumption on interior and external lighting, the manufacturer went for LED lamps. A state-of-the-art panel with three LCD touch screens instead of analogue indicators and traditional switches complete the driver's cabin. The bus contains a maximum of 27 seats (depending on the interior layout). A ramp for disabled passengers is installed in the second door, and space is reserved for passengers using wheelchairs, prams, or pushchairs, opposite of that door.

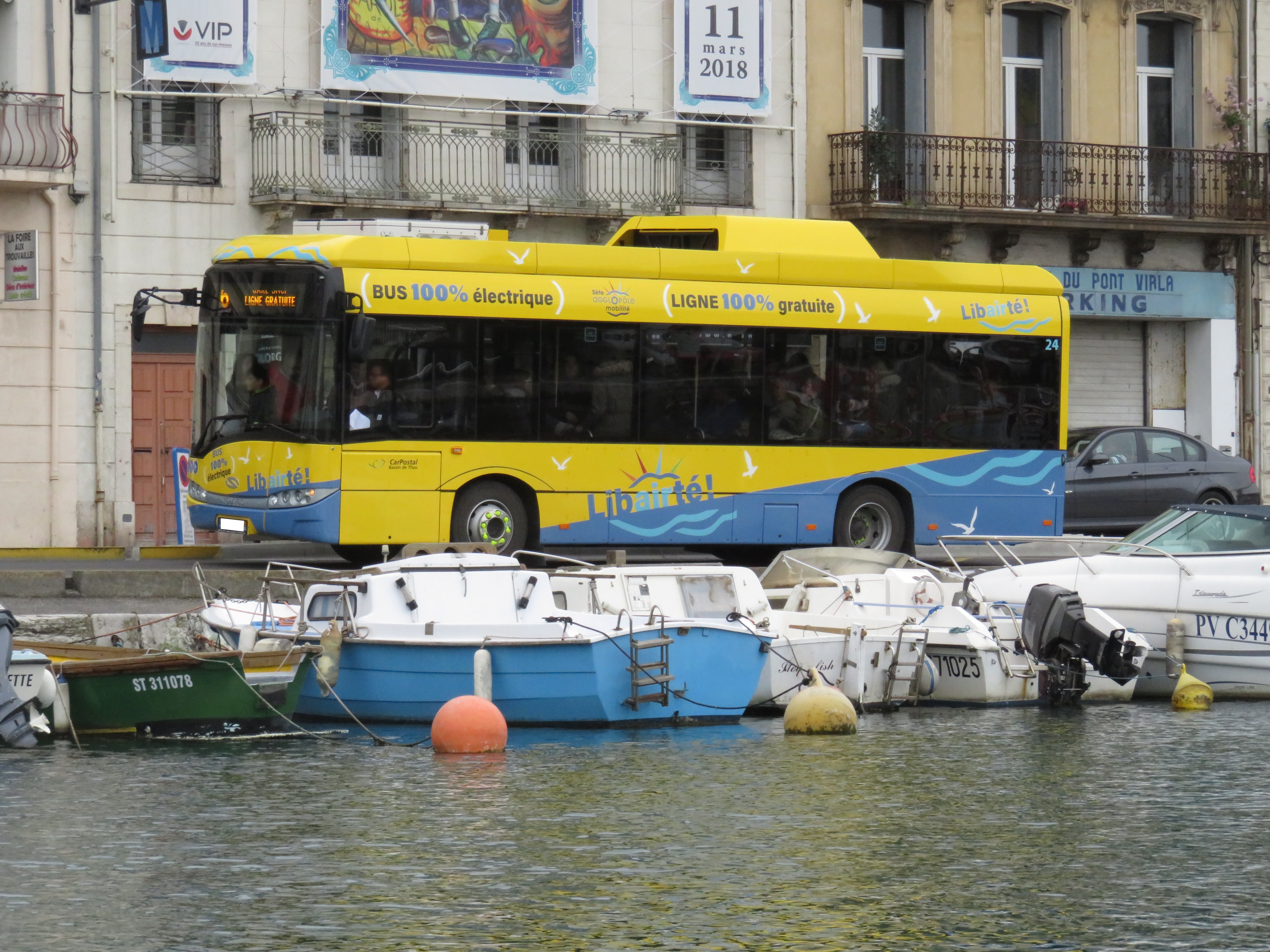
Urbino 8,9 LE electric in Sète (France)

== Operators ==
Country	City	Operator	Number of vehicles	Years of delivery
Austria	Klagenfurt	Stadtwerke Klagenfurt	1	2013
Belgium	Brussels	STIB	7	2018
Czech Republic	České Budějovice	DPM	11	2018
France	Sète	Agglopôle Mobilité	2	2018
Hungary	Paks	Paksi Közlekedési kft.	4	2020
Latvia	Jūrmala	JAS	2	2019
Poland	Ostrołęka	MZK	2	2015
Poland	Kraków	MPK	4	2016
Poland	Jaworzno	PKM	4	2017
Poland	Chodzież	MZK	1	2018
Poland	Stalowa Wola	MZK	10	2018
Poland	Września	City Hall	1	2017
Poland	Katowice	RCKiK	2	2018
Poland	Ciechanów	ZKM	1	2018
Switzerland	St. Gallenen	VBSG	1	2019
Switzerland	Fribourg	tpf	5	2021
Vehicles in total: 57 for 14 recipients				

=== Poland ===
In June 2012, as part of tests, the first prototype bus carried passengers free of charge for three weeks during the UEFA European Football Championship 2012, in Poznań on the “E” line, running from the International Airport Poznań – Ławica, past roundabout Rondo Kaponiera up to shopping, art and business centre Centrum Handlu, Sztuki i Biznesu Stary Browar. During that time the bus covered about 3000 km failure-free. For promotional purposes the bus body was covered in artificial grass, while the headliner featured the image of the sky. In July 2012 the bus was tested by operator MZA Warszawa on the bus line 222 (which later was serviced by Solaris Urbino 12 electric buses acquired by the operator in 2015) . In the same year, the bus was also tested on the 370 bus line route on the streets of Jaworzno. During tests in Zakopane, the Urbino electric 8,9 LE carried passengers among others to mountain lake Morskie Oko.

In September 2014, Solaris signed a contract for the supply of two electric buses of the Solaris Urbino 8,9 LE electric to public transport operator MZK Ostrołęka. The contract was worth PLN 3.2 million, or 1.6 million per bus. The buses made it to the buyer in spring 2015. These were the first new electric buses to go to the Polish recipient.

In January 2013, tests with the Solaris Urbino 8,9 LE electric were carried out by public transport operator MPK Kraków. The electric bus was tested on the route of bus line 537 connecting Kraków Główny railway station with the district of Witkowice. During the tests the Solaris bus reached a maximum range of c. 100 km on a single charging session. In 2014, Kraków launched tests of the 12-metre version of the electric Solaris. A year later operator MPK Kraków announced a tender for the supply of four nine-metre electric buses, which ended in two bids being filed: one by Solaris and the other by Czech manufacturer SOR. The bid was won by Solaris, which consequently supplied four pantograph-charged Urbino 8,9 LE electric buses in 2016.

After the tests in 2013, and pursuant to the delivery of the first Urbino 12 electric to Jaworzno, in 2017, operator PKM purchased another 22 electric buses from Solaris, including four Urbino 8,9 LE electric. Thanks to these investments, emission-free buses now constitute 40% of the fleet of PKM Jaworzno.

At the beginning of 2017, operator MZK in Chodzież launched a call for bids for the supply of one MIDI-class electric bus. The tender was won by Solaris, and later, in March 2018, the bus was handed over to the operator.

In April 2017, a tender for 19 city buses, including 10 electric ones, was announced by public transport operator MZK Stalowa Wola. As a result, the company received 10 electric Solaris buses one year later.

Also at the beginning of 2017, Solaris secured an order for one Solaris Urbino 8,9 LE electric for the municipality of Września; the bus was delivered in December 2017, whereas in January 2018 it rolled out on the streets of the town constituting part of the newly launched local public transport service.

At the beginning of 2017, the Regional Blood Donation and Hemotherapy Centre (RCKiK) launched a call for tender for two electrically propelled mobile blood donation centres. The sole offer was submitted by Solaris, which already had experience making a mobile blood donation centres based on the Solaris Vacanza coach. The gross price of the two Urbino 8,9 LE electric adapted to the needs of the RCKiK was set at PLN 6.1 million. The first bus was delivered to Katowice mid-2018. It is the first electric bloodmobile in the world.

=== Europe ===
The first one to buy electric Solaris buses was, in 2013, the Austrian city of Klagenfurt. Public services company Stadtwerke Klagenfurt acquired one electric vehicle to service the route between the main railway station and the university campus.

In July 2017, the biggest Belgian bus operator – STIB, which handles urban bus services in Brussels, placed an order for 7 zero-emission city buses of the MIDI class with the Polish manufacturer; these buses were delivered at the beginning of 2018.

In 2018, Solaris provided two Solaris Urbino 8,9 LE electric buses to the city of Sète, on the southern coast of France.

The year 2018 saw the delivery of the first electric buses of 8.9 m made in collaboration with Škoda Electric. As was the case for the 12-metre buses produced by Škoda together with Solaris, these vehicles were also later named Škoda Perun. The receiving party was the municipal operator from České Budějovice.
