= Solaris Urbino =

Series of buses produced by Solaris Bus & Coach

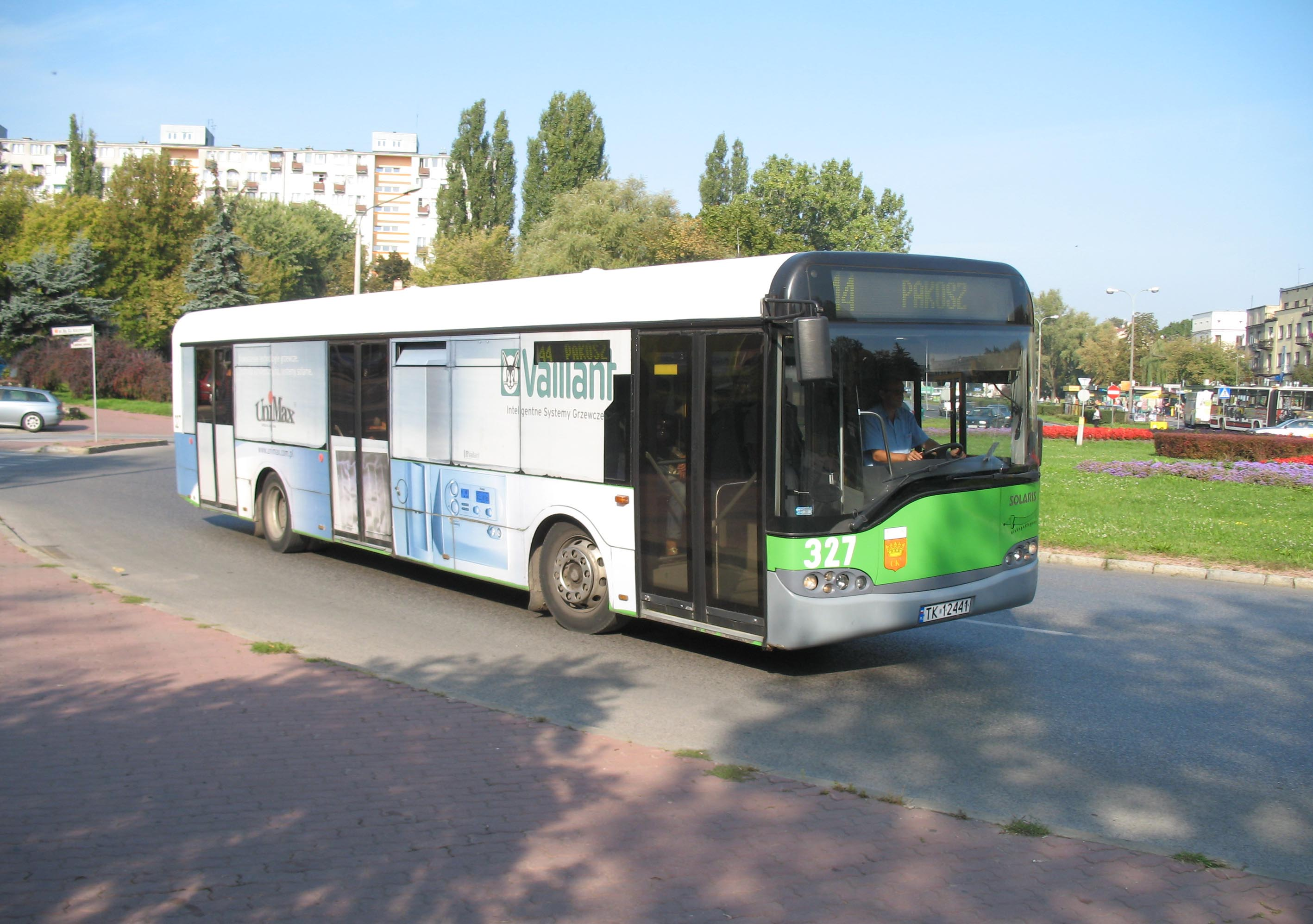
Solaris Urbino 12 First Generation in Kielce.

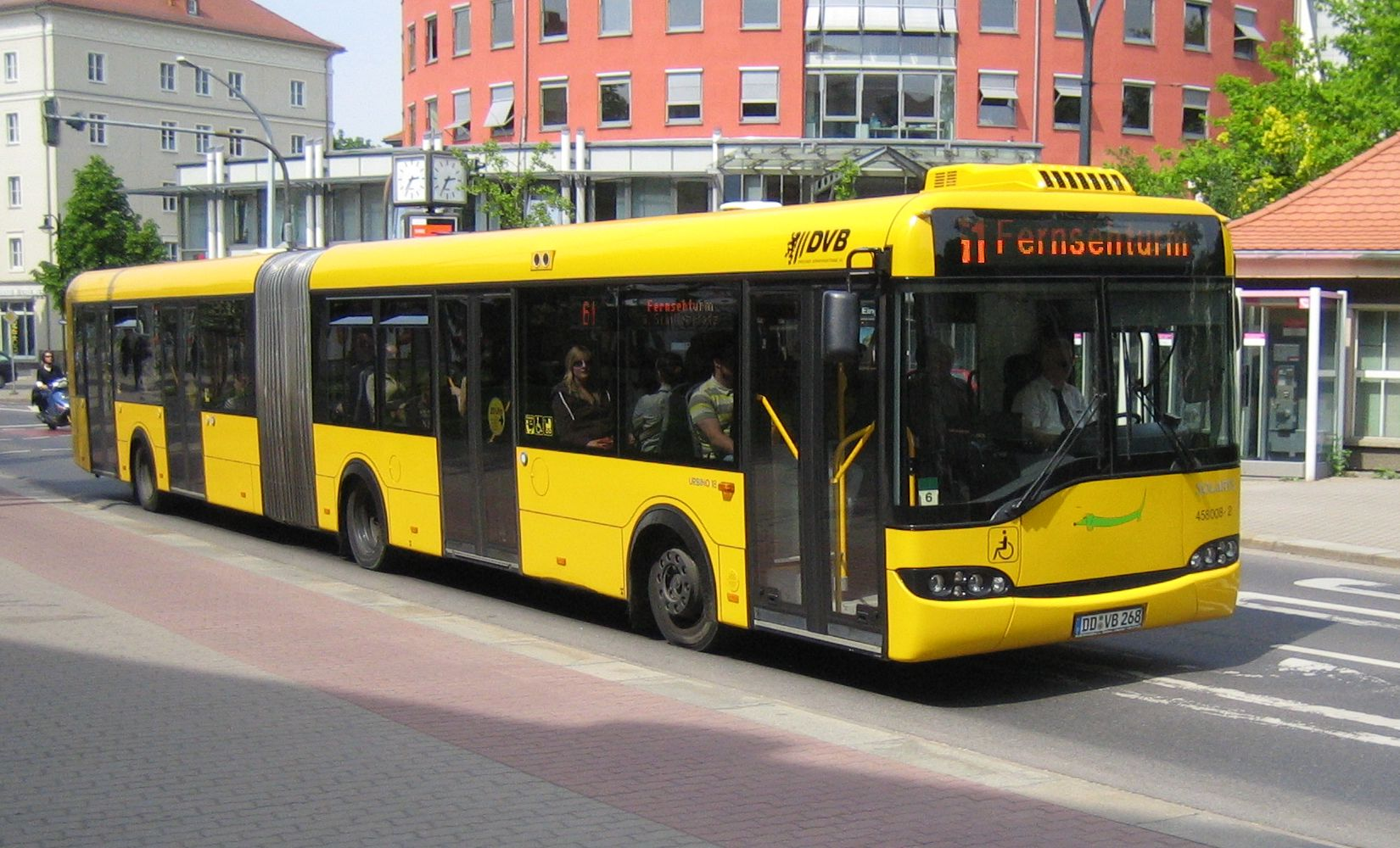
Solaris Urbino 18 Second Generation in Dresden

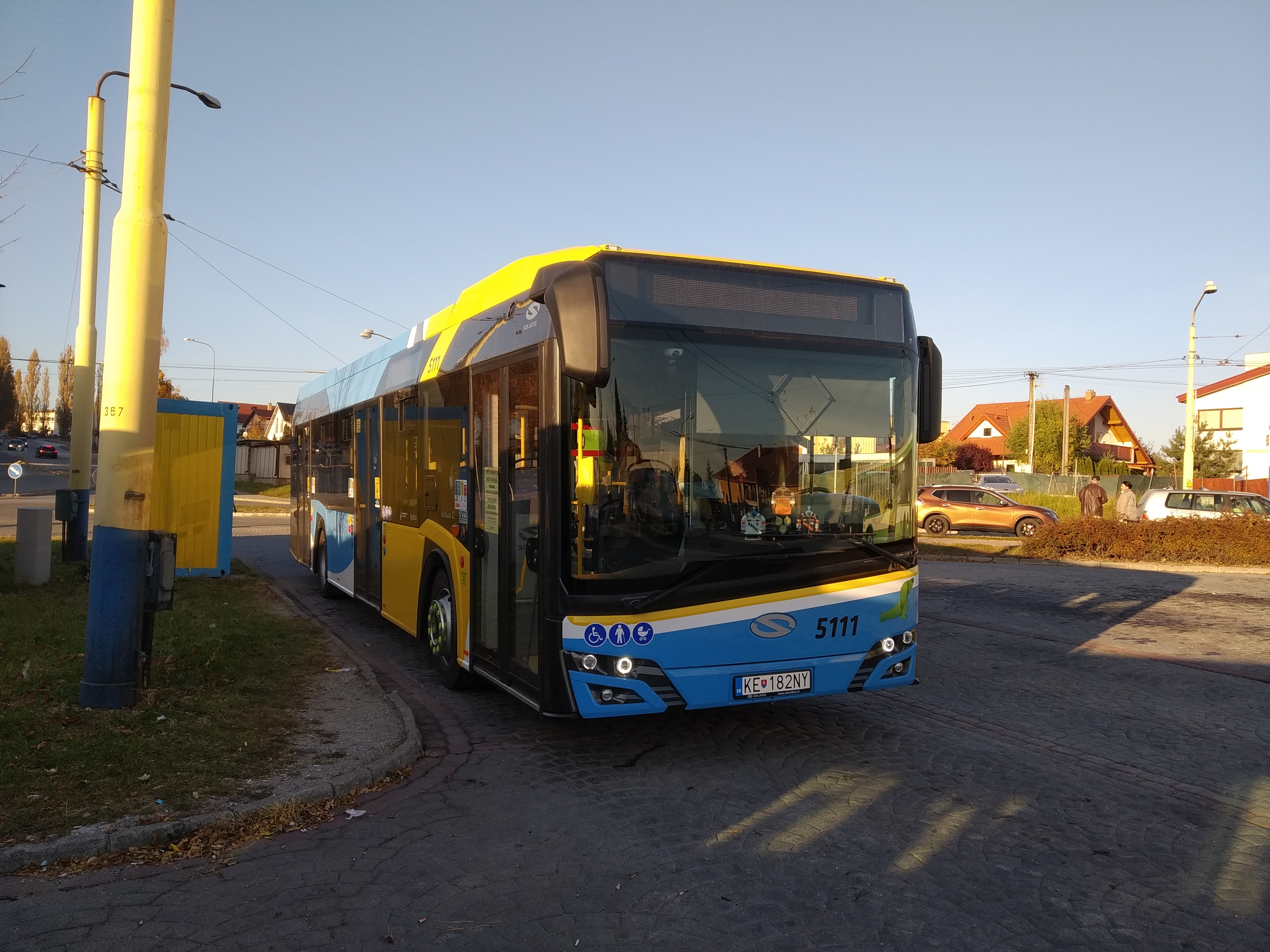
Solaris Urbino 12 in Košice.

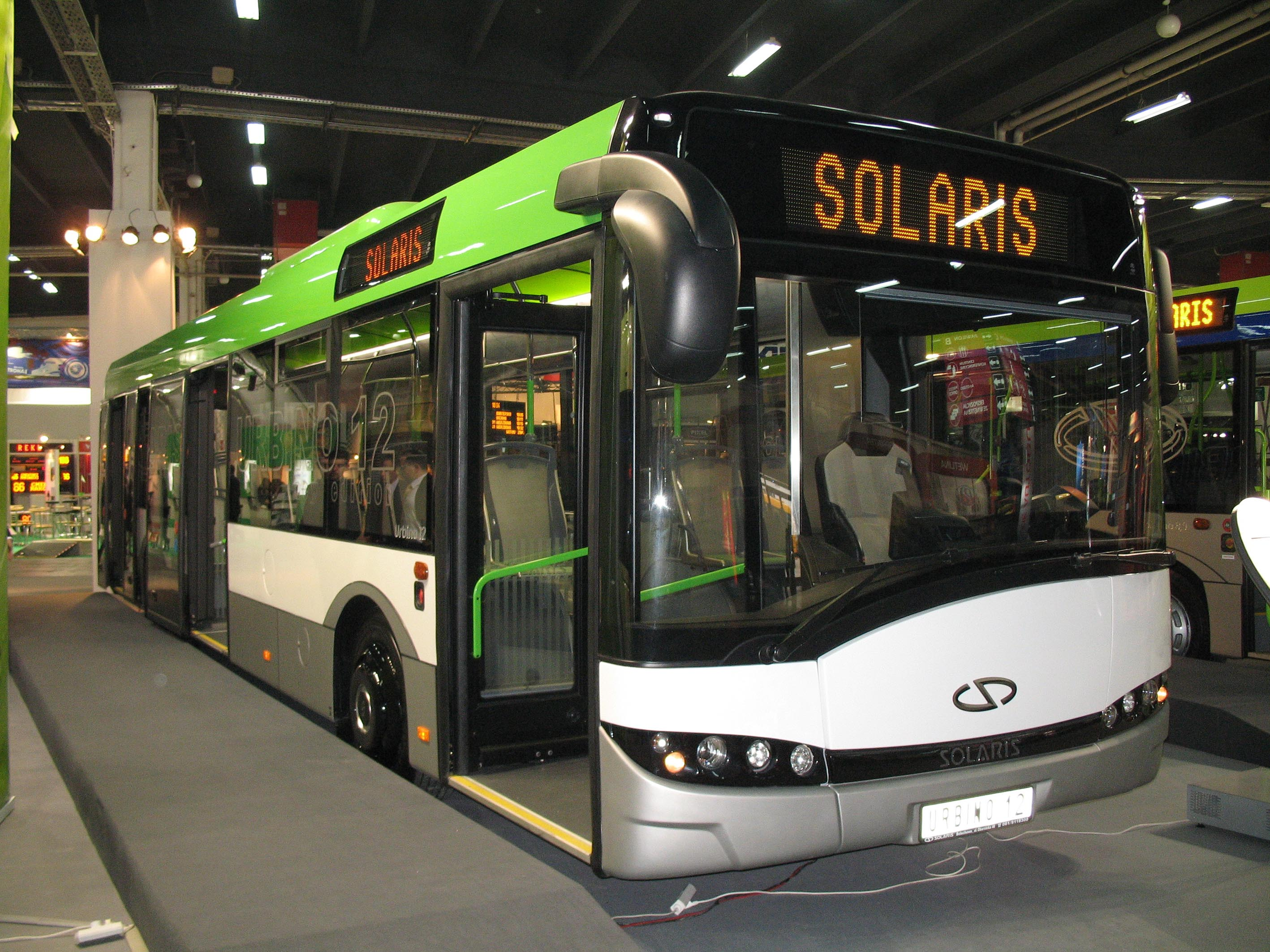
Prototype Solaris Urbino 12 3,5 Generation from 2008.

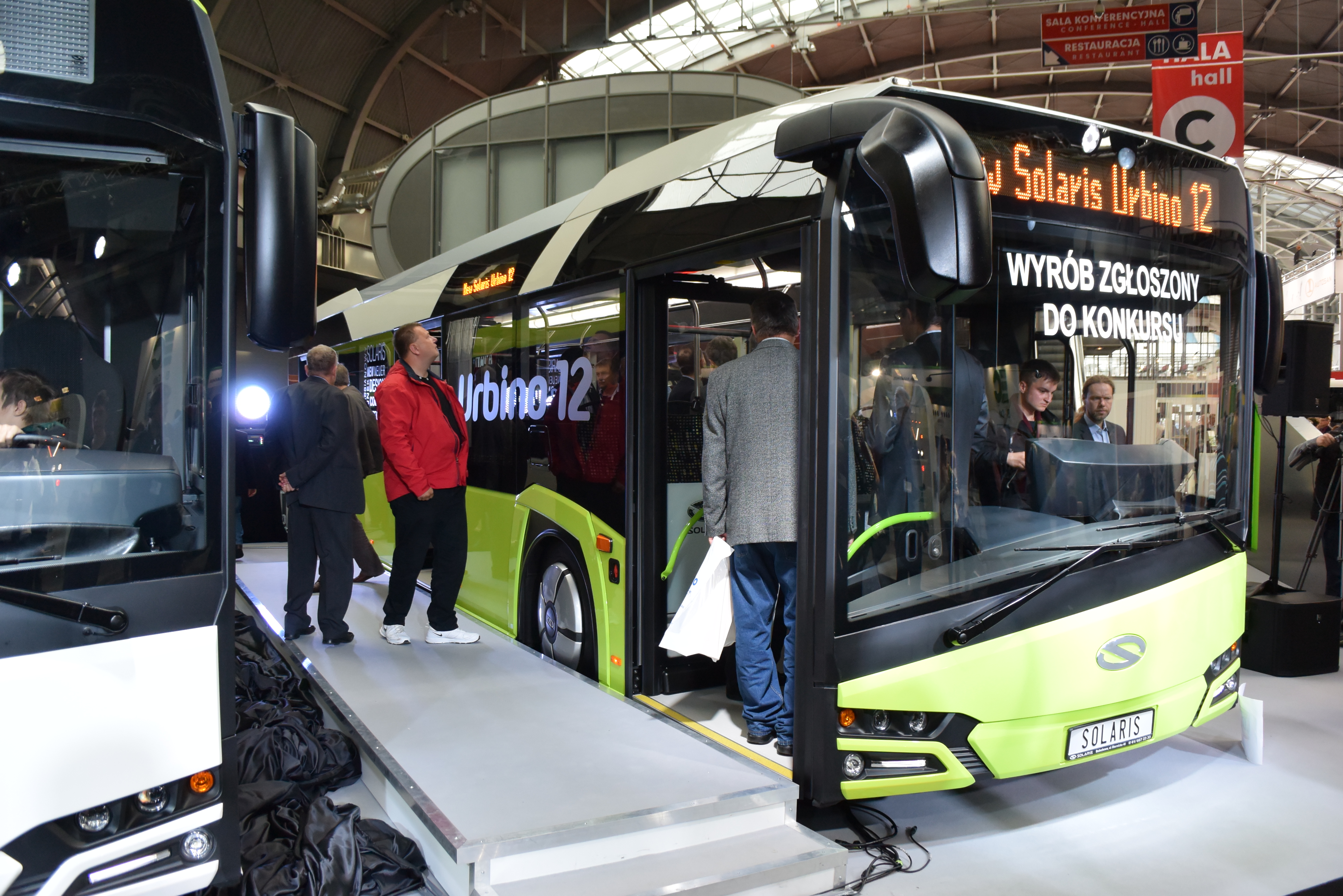
New Solaris Urbino - premier in Transexpo 2014 in Kielce.

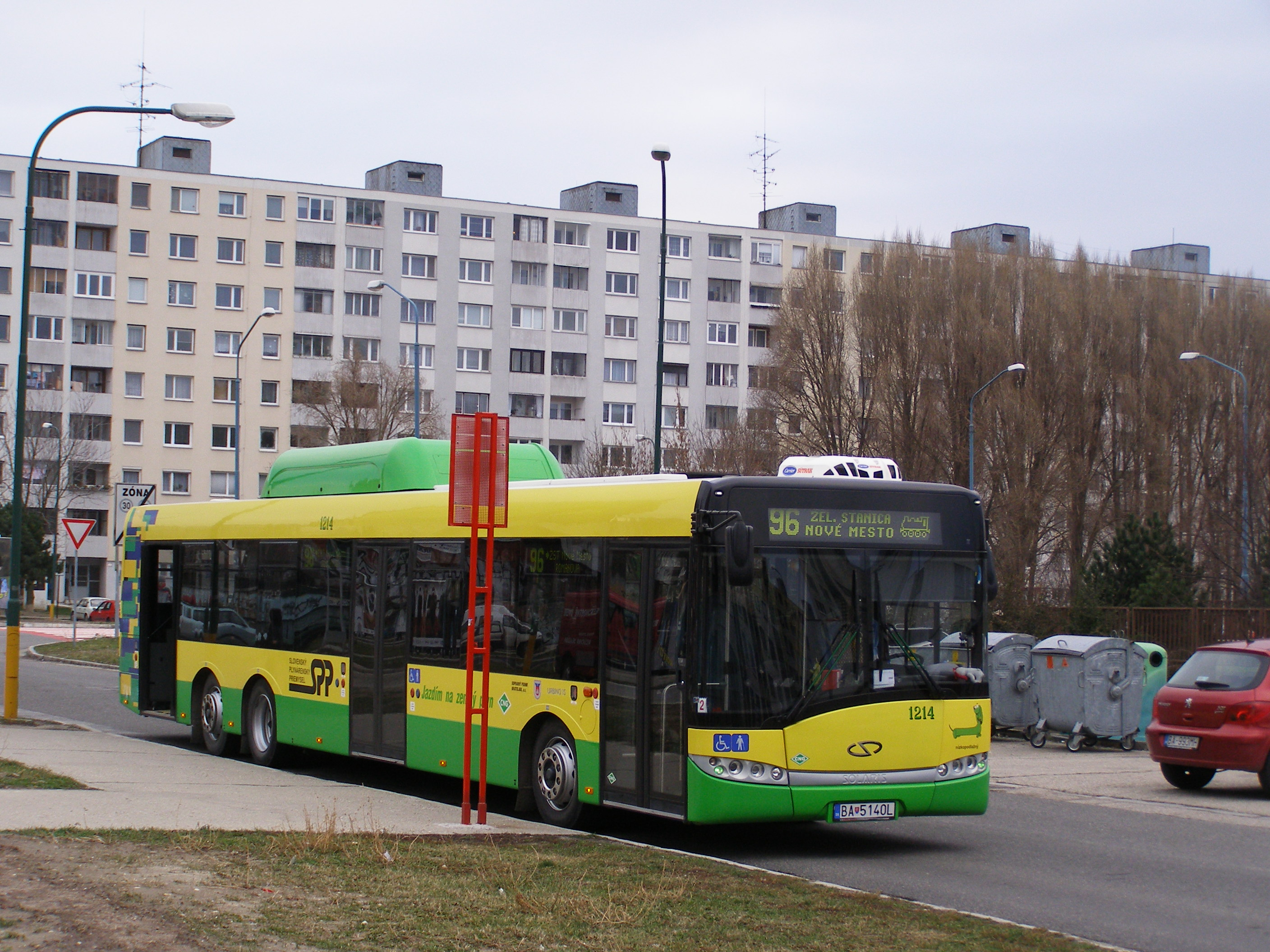
Solaris Urbino 15 in Bratislava.

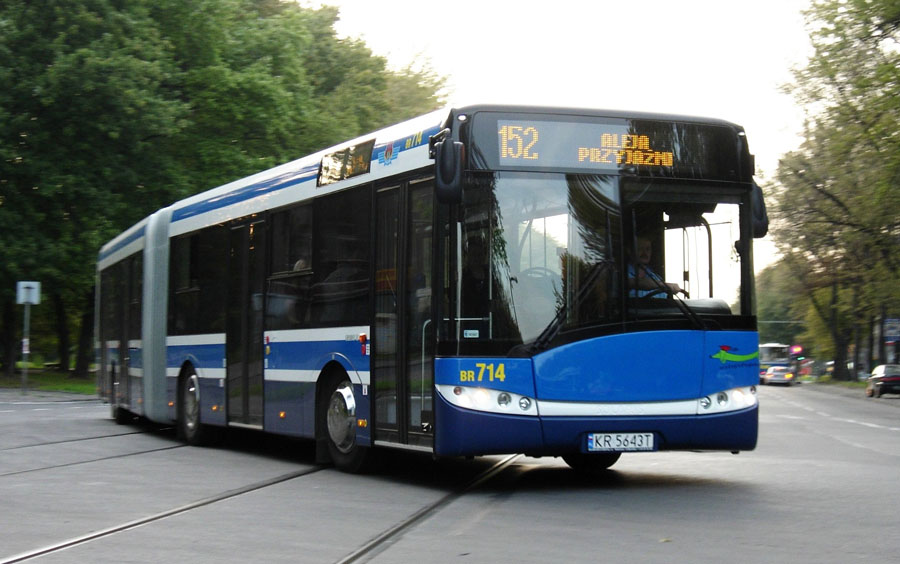
Solaris Urbino 18 from MPK Kraków.

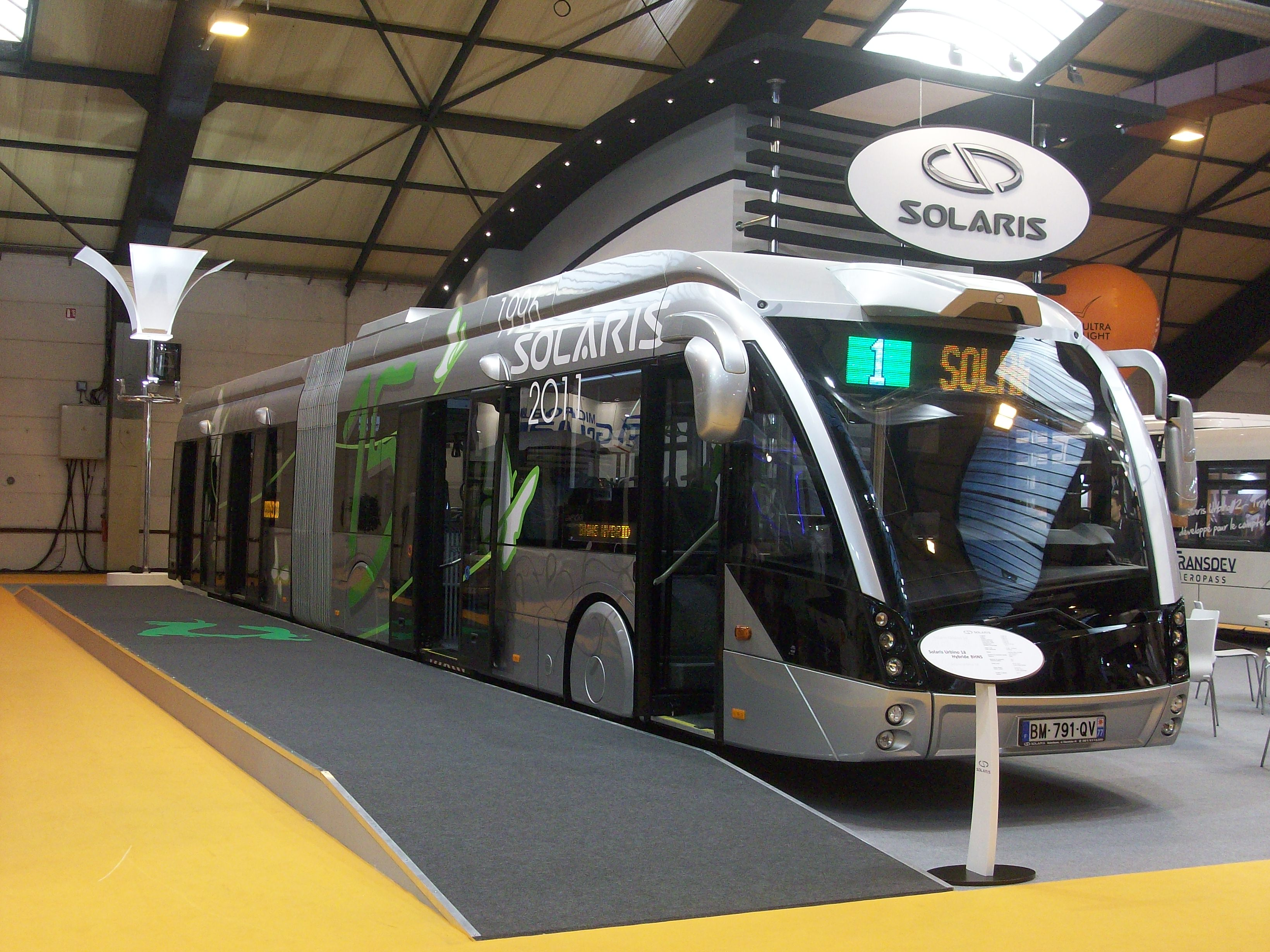
Solaris Urbino 18 Hybrid MetroStyle in the new style at the RNTP show in 2011 in Strasbourg.

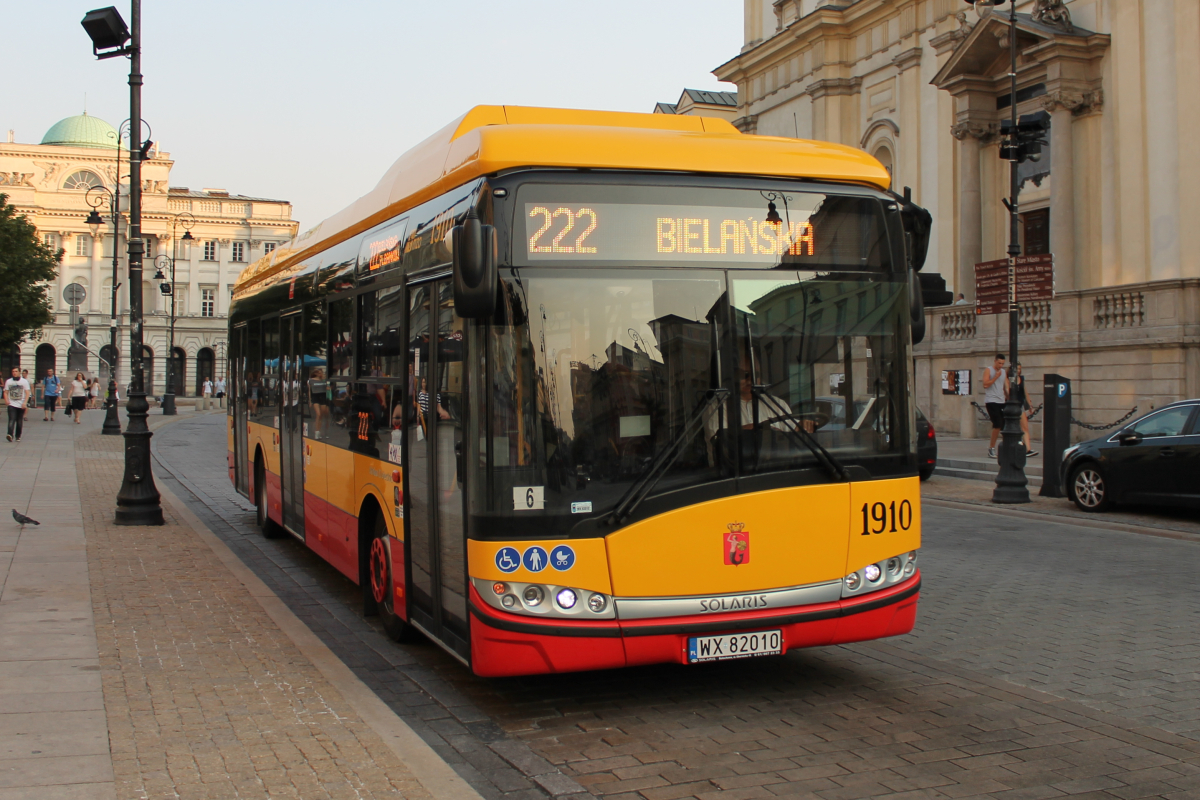
Solaris Urbino 12 Electric from Warsaw MZA

Solaris Urbino is a series of low-floor buses and low-entry doorway intercity buses, powered by diesel drive engines and alternative fuel (CNG, gas and biogas, hybrid and electric), produced by the Polish company Solaris Bus & Coach in Bolechowo near Poznań in Poland. Currently produced models are of the fourth generation, and by 2019 the production will start for the fifth.

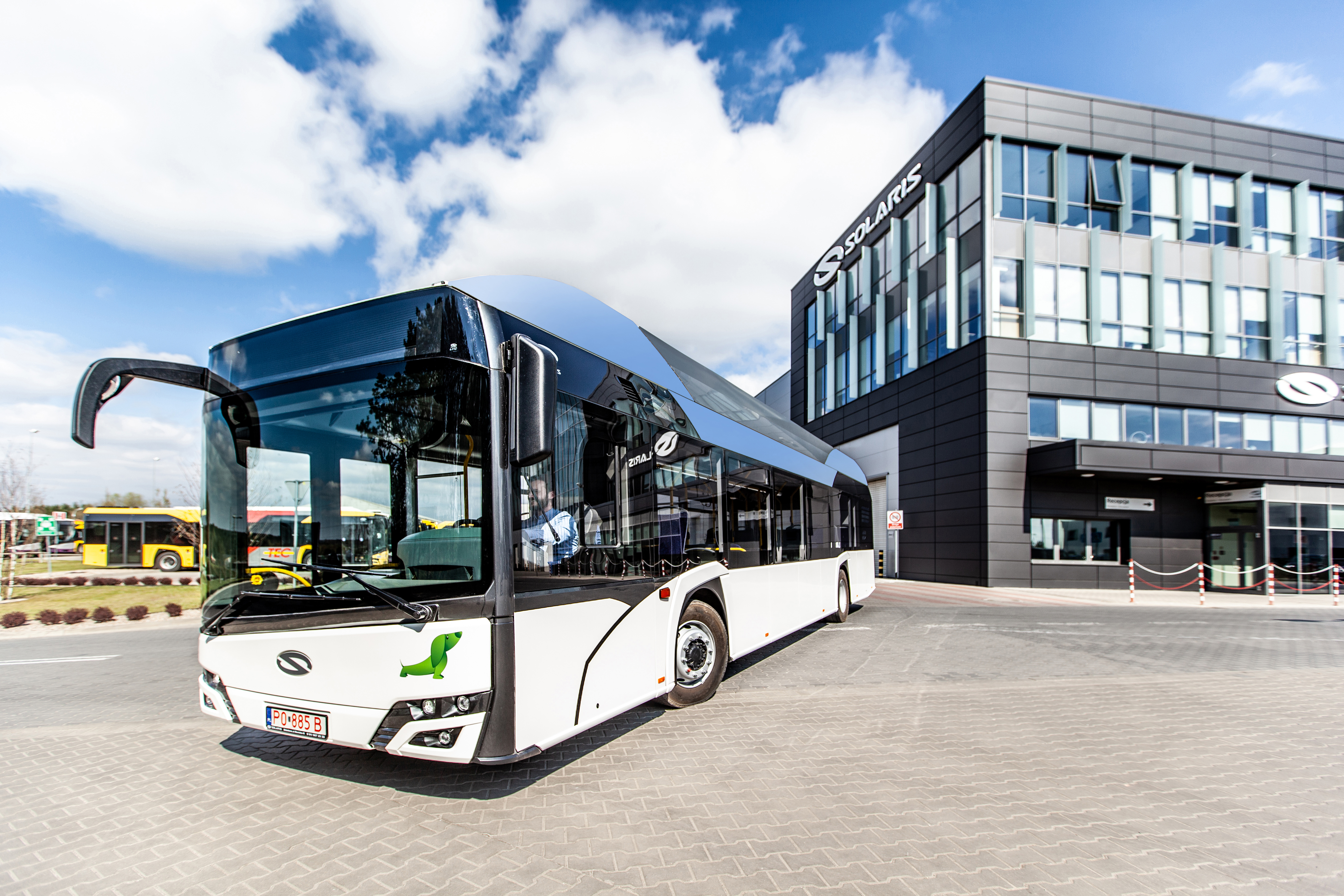
Solaris Urbino 12 hydrogen

Solaris Urbino buses series have been very successful in the market, as evidenced by many orders in Poland and abroad. However, the buses are made exclusively for left-hand drive markets.

== History ==
The first bus from Solaris Urbino series rolled off the production line in Bolechowo in mid-1999. It was a Solaris Urbino 12 which in the second half of the year debuted two new models known as the Solaris Urbino 15 and Solaris Urbino 18, and in 2000 the series was joined by the Solaris Urbino 9. They have been designed by Neoplan with the participation of designers from Berlin IFS Designatelier which designed all of the next generation of the models.

In the second half of 2001 and 2002 the models of the second generation were ready. The 9-metre model was then replaced by the Solaris Urbino 10. Since 2005, the buses in the Solaris Urbino series are all third generation. The third series is distinguished by a characteristic depth front bow, which allows the driver better visibility at bus stops. Special orders were delivered, in the second-generation. During the IAA Nutzfahrzeuge in Hannover, which was held from September 25 - October 2, 2008, at the same in Poland the Transexpo Trade Fair in Kielce in October 2008, had presented the prototype model of the Solaris Urbino 12 New Edition generation 3.5. While maintaining the body of the third generation, the buses in the series received a new refurbished interior from the upcoming new fourth generation of buses. Where the interior had been improved by stylistic and illumination of the interior. Also a new instrument panel and steering wheel was included for the easy operation of the bus.

The shortest vehicle of the series is Solaris Alpino 8.9 LE, which has a length of 8.9 meters and from the rest of the models in the series is narrower by 15 centimetres, and for this reason received the name Solaris Urbino 8.9 LE for marketing reasons.

In 2012, two new low-floor models were added to the series which were the Solaris Urbino 12.9 and Solaris Urbino 18.75.

The Solaris Urbino series also includes the Solaris Urbino 12 Low Entry (from 2005) and the Solaris Urbino 15 LE (from 2008), which was built preferably for companies for intercity and commuter routes.

The Solaris Urbino bus series has a bus which is built for urban and interurban commutes which is the Solaris Urbino 12 Ü (from the German Überland), which made its debut at the IAA Nutzfahrzeuge in Hanover in September 2012. Instead of the classic box type style the bus had a bow-like cabin and the MAN D20 engine. The capacity for seated passengers increased to 44 in the front of the bus.

In 2014 at the world premiere at the IAA in Hannover and at the Polish premiere at Transexpo Trade Fair in Kielce the new model of the Solaris Urbino series bus was shown, designed from the beginning in order to meet the needs of passengers and companies better.

== Models ==
The Solaris Urbino series includes the following models:

- Solaris Urbino 10, the successor of the Solaris Urbino 9
- Solaris Urbino 12
- Solaris Urbino 12 Hybrid
- Solaris Urbino 12 hydrogen
- Solaris Urbino 12 electric
- Solaris Urbino 12 Ü
- Solaris Urbino 12,9
- Solaris Urbino 12,9 Hybrid
- Solaris Urbino 15
- Solaris Urbino 18
- Solaris Urbino 18 Hybrid
- Solaris Urbino 18 hydrogen
- Solaris Urbino 18,75
- Solaris Urbino 18 electric
- Solaris Urbino 24 electric

The low entry and local buses are:

- Solaris Urbino 8,9 LE
- Solaris Urbino 8,9 LE Electric
- Solaris Urbino 12 LE
- Solaris Urbino 15 LE
- Solaris Urbino 18 LE
