= Solaris Urbino 15 =

Polish 6-wheel bus

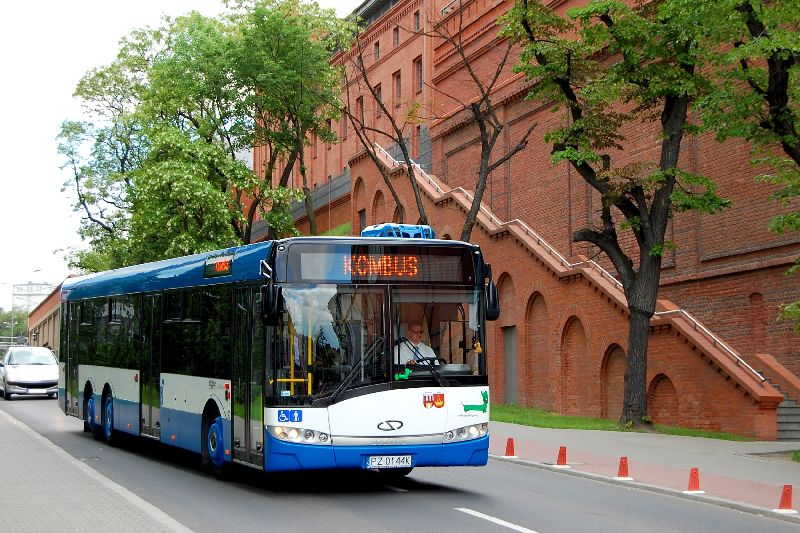

Overview
- Manufacturer: Solaris Bus & Coach
- Production: 1999–2018
- Assembly: Bolechowo, Poland

Body and chassis
- Class: Bus chassis
- Doors: 3 doors, 2 doors
- Floor type: Low entry

Powertrain
- Engine: 1) MAN D0826LOH18; 2) MAN D0836LOH02; 3) DAF PR228; 4) Iveco Cursor 8 F2BE0642A (CNG)
- Capacity: 164–167 passengers (36–46 seats)
- Power output: 1) 191 kW (260 HP); 2) 206 kW (280 HP); 3) 228 kW (310 HP)
- Transmission: 1) Voith DIWA D854.3E; 2) Voith DIWA D864.3E; 3) Voith DIWA D854.5; 4) ZF Ecomat 6HP594

Dimensions
- Length: 14.59 m (47 ft 10 in)
- Width: 2.55 m (8 ft 4 in)
- Height: 2.85 m (9 ft 4 in); 3.035 m (9 ft 11.5 in) (with a/c); 3.43 m (11 ft 3 in) (CNG)

Chronology
- Predecessor: Neoplan N4020

Solaris Urbino 15, Solaris Urbino 15 CNG is a low floor tri-axle single-decker bus from the Solaris Urbino series, for public transportation vehicles. In 1999–2001, the company Neoplan Polska manufactured the bus. It is the successor of the Neoplan N4020. Since 2001 it is produced by the Polish company Solaris Bus & Coach in Bolechowo near Poznań in Poland. Since 2008 the company has manufactured the low-floor version of the Solaris Urbino 15.

== History ==
The first generation of the Solaris Urbino 15 was produced from the second half of 1999. From mid-2002 the second generation of the models was produced. Since 2005, the third generation models are being built. They are produced in three versions of propulsion systems: diesel (complying with Euro IV and Euro V or EEV), electric - as the Solaris Trollino 15 and CNG gas-powered (from spring 2005). It is one of the few buses with a length of 15 metres (49 ft) produced in Europe and the world. It is quite popular in the Czech Republic and Slovak market. In the early years of production the buses sold very well in Latvia and in Poland.

== Specification (diesel bus) ==
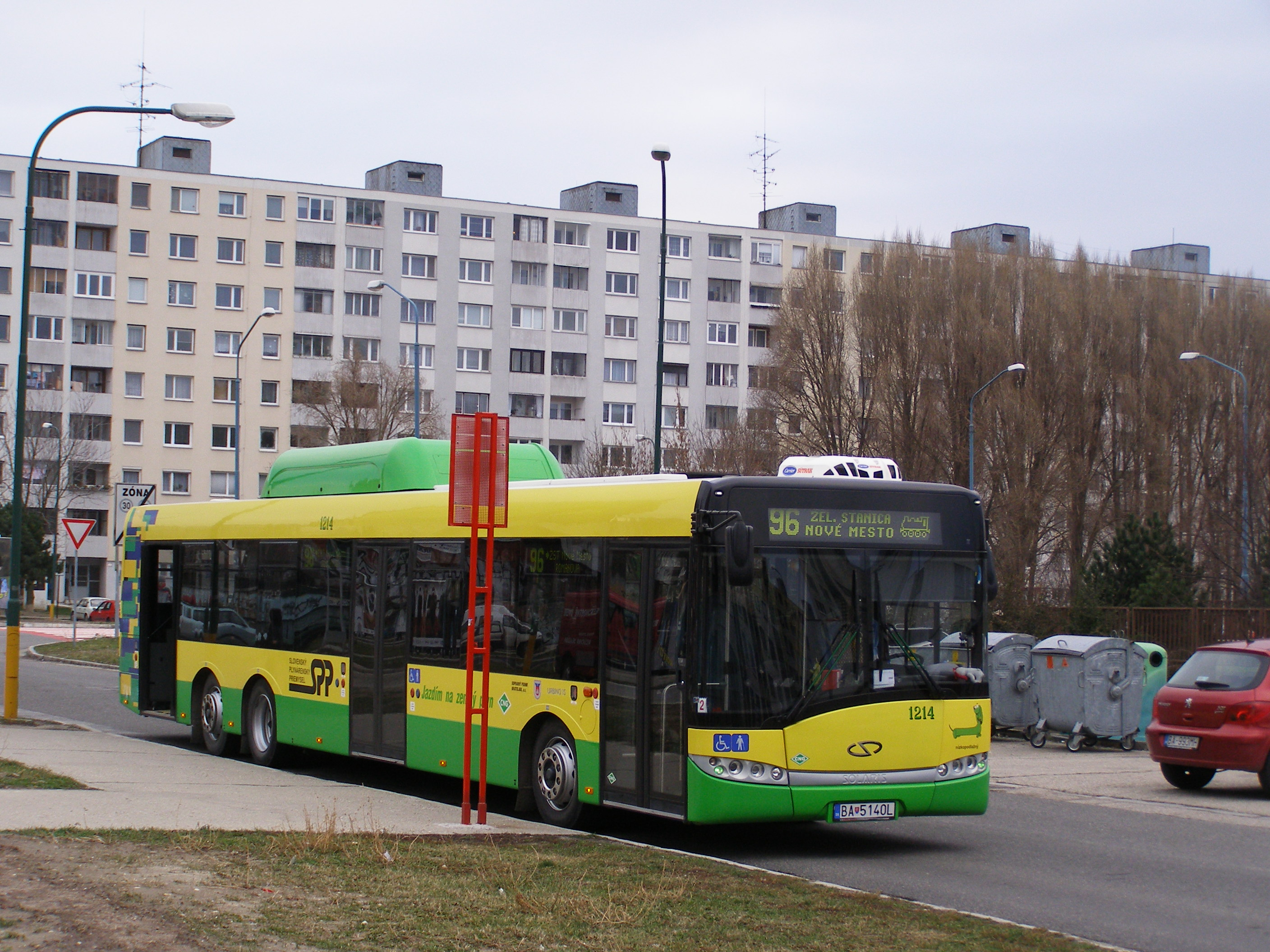
Solaris Urbino 15 in Bratislava.

=== Drive ===
Initially the model used the MAN D0836LOH02 engines, with maximum power of 191 kW (260 hp) and 206 kW (280 hp). Currently, the bus is equipped with a standard DAF PR228 drive unit with maximum power of 228 kW, with a Voith DIWA.5 gearbox and Webasto additional heating system. Liquid tanks are able to accommodate up to 250 liters of diesel (optional 350 liters) and 40 liters of AdBlue. On request it is possible to choose the DAF PR265 engine (265 kW), Cummins ISLe4 320 or 340 and the ZF 6HP Ecomat 4.

=== Chassis ===
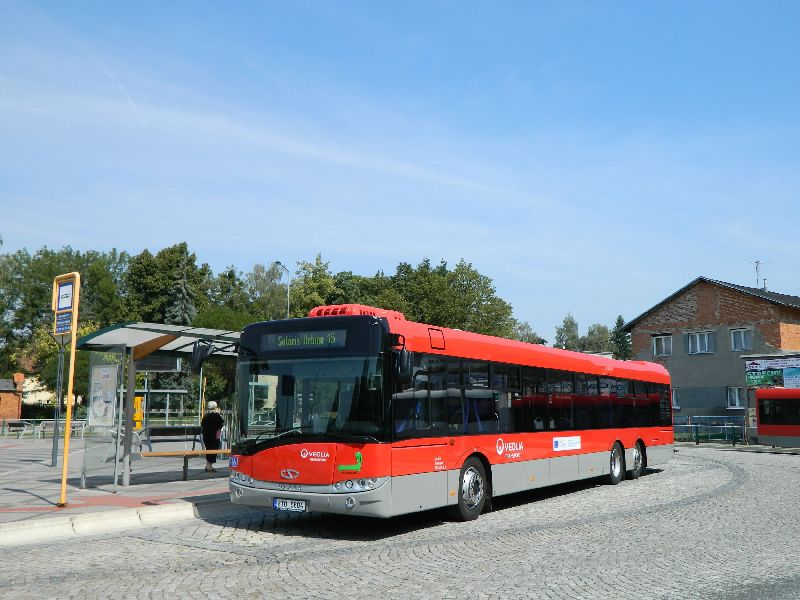
Solaris Urbino 15.

- Front axle: ZF RL 85 / A (rigid axle)
- Drive axle: AV 132
- Trailing axle ZF RL 85A / N
- ZF Steering Servocom 8098
- Dual-EBS
- ABS
- ASR
- Handbrake (parking) with manual brake release function
- Retarder gearbox
- Leveled suspension pneumatic valves (lifting 60 mm (2.4 in), 70 mm (2.8 in) kneeling).

=== Ventilation, air conditioning and heating ===
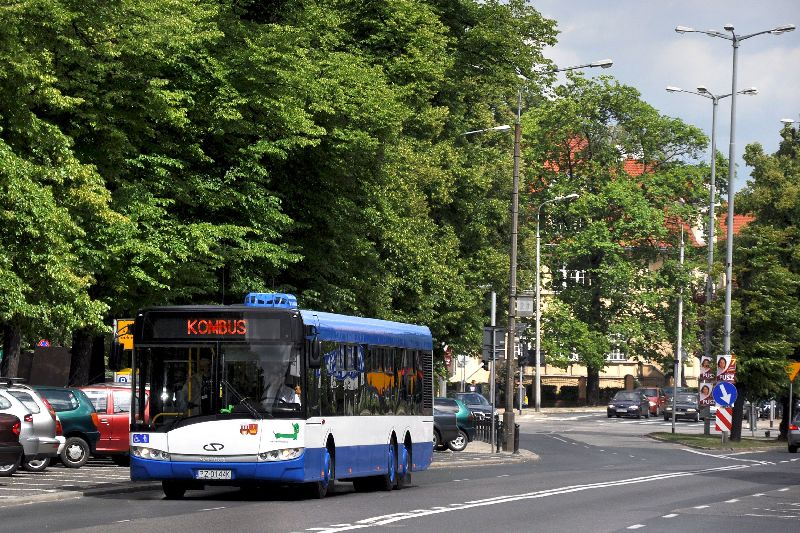
Solaris Urbino 15.

- Two ventilators for blowing and extraction
- Two (three in the absence of air conditioning), electric sunroofs
- Convector heaters and three two-stage blowers

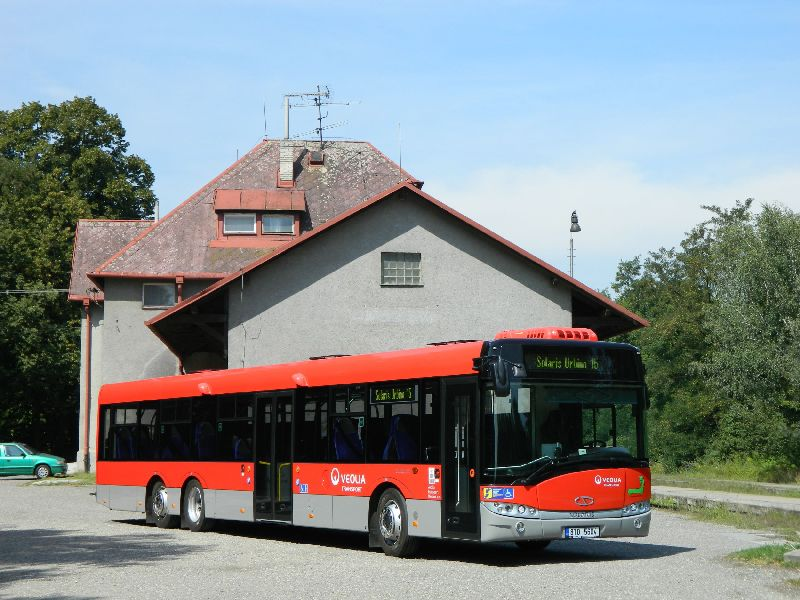
Solaris Urbino 15

== Gallery ==
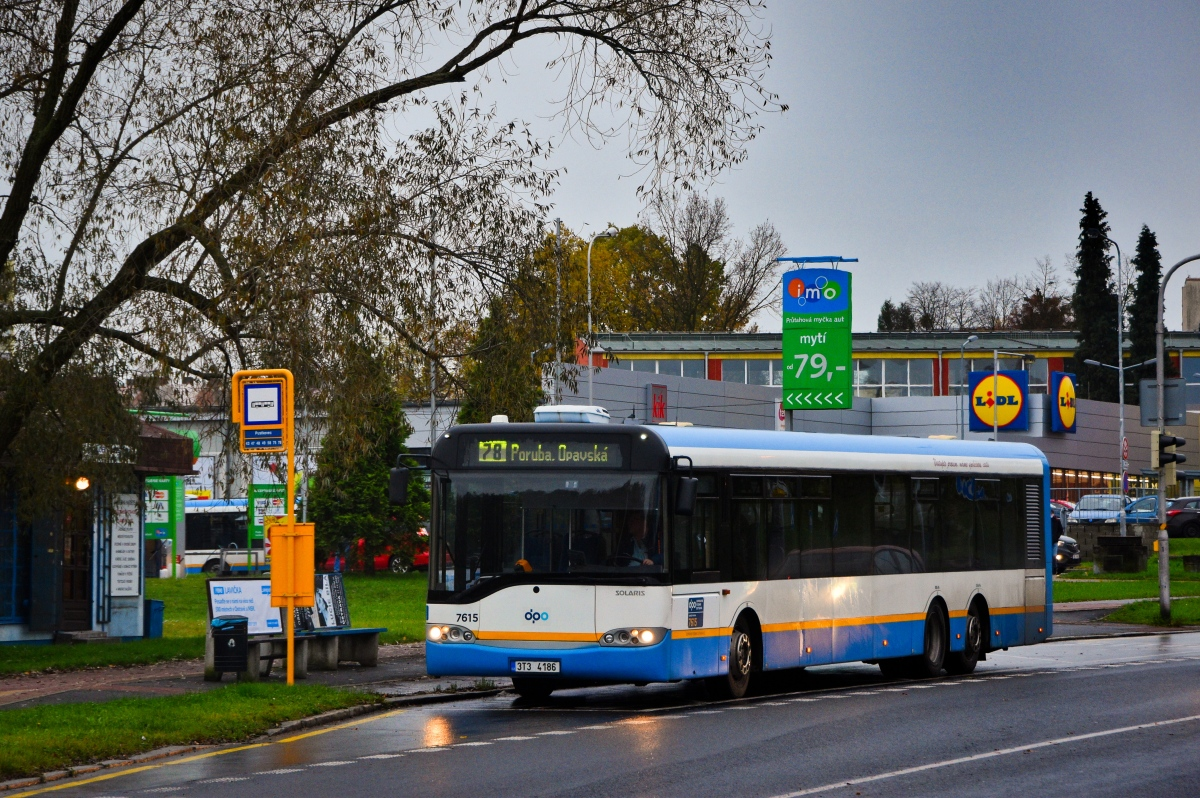
In Ostrava

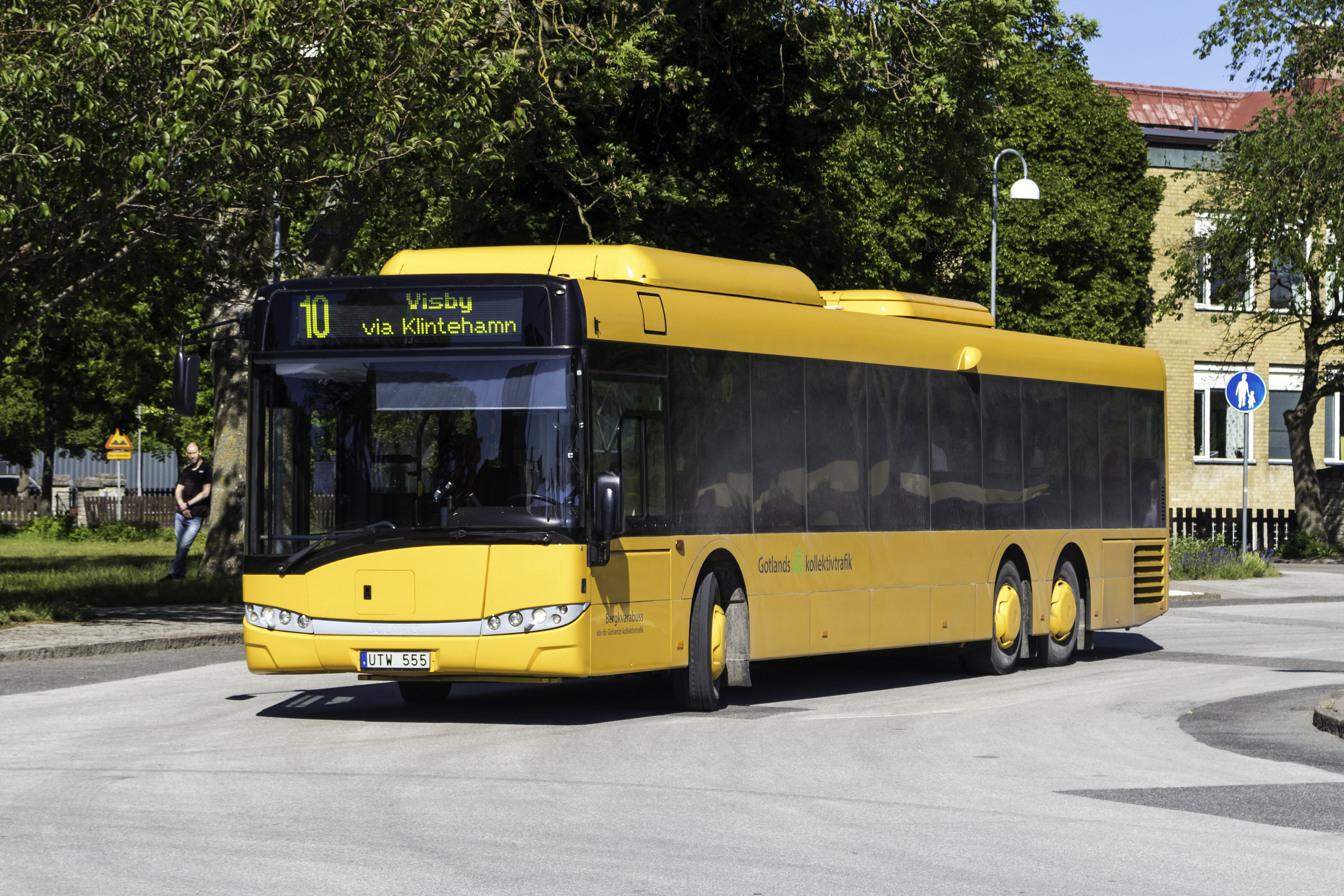
In Visby

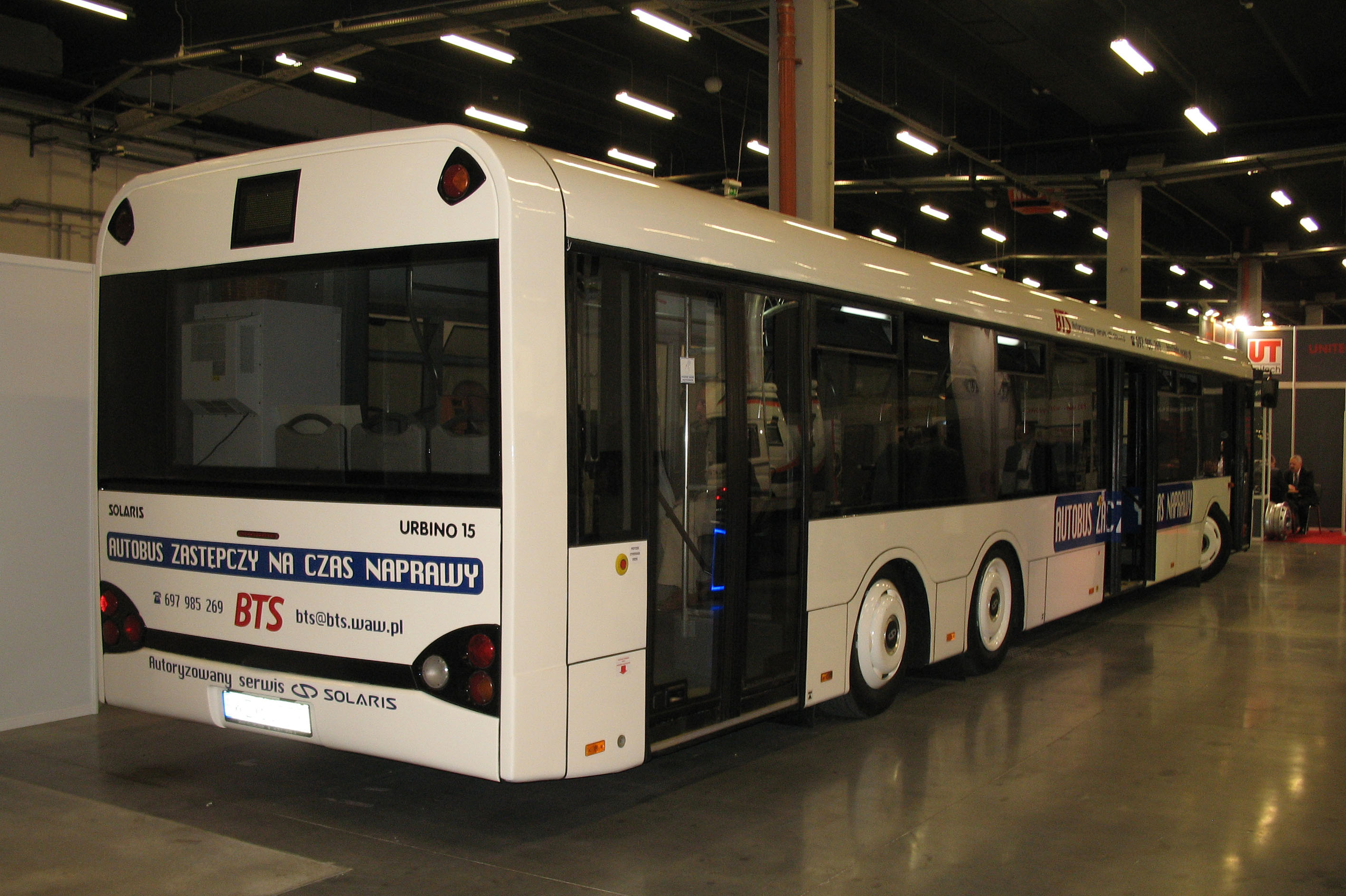
In Kielce
