= Solaris Urbino 18 Hybrid =

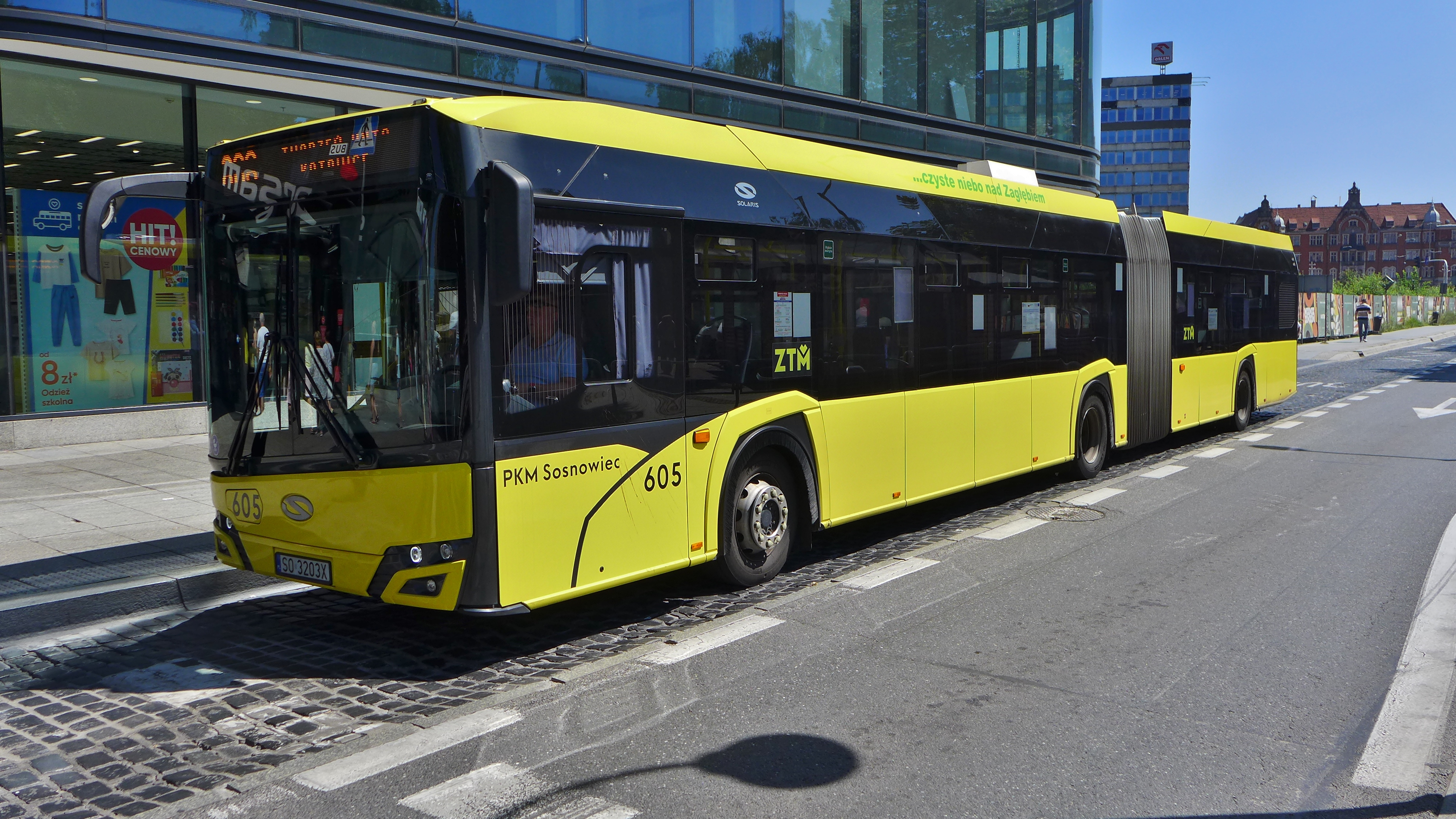

Overview
- Manufacturer: Solaris Bus & Coach
- Production: 2006-present
- Assembly: Bolechowo, Poland

Body and chassis
- Class: Single-deck city bus
- Doors: 4
- Floor type: Low floor

Powertrain
- Engine: Cummins ISBe5 250B (Hybrid II); Allison Ev50 (Hybrid II); Cummins ISLe4 340B (Hybrid I)
- Capacity: 160
- Power output: 178 kW (242 HP); 75 kW; 248 kW (340 HP)

Dimensions
- Length: 18000 mm
- Width: 2550 mm
- Height: 3225 mm (Hybrid I); 3250 mm (Hybrid II, MetroStyle); 3480 mm (DIWAhybrid); 3500 mm (Vossloh Kiepe)
- Curb weight: 17500 kg

Solaris Urbino 18 Hybrid is a family of low-floor articulated hybrid buses from the Solaris Urbino series for city communication services. The production began in 2006 by Solaris Bus & Coach in Bolechowo near Poznań in Poland. The second generation of buses were produced from 2008 onwards.

== History ==
The first generation of Solaris Urbino 18 Hybrid was built between 2006 and 2008. From the second half of 2008, the models are built in the second generation. They have been produced by the use of similarities with the Solaris Urbino 18.

The characteristic of the Urbino 18 is a green dachshund. Various hybrid versions include specific symbols. The hybrid models have a dachshund which is in between two hearts which symbolise the two types of power.

During the production of the Solaris Urbino 18 Hybrid model, four types of hybrid power systems have been implemented. The different versions can be distinguished by the difference in the interior, like that of the Paris transportation system BRT type - BHNS, which differentiates it from the Solaris Urbino series bus family.

From the autumn of 2010, 18 buses have been produced with the Allison I and Allison II systems.

=== Solaris Urbino 18 Hybrid Allison ===
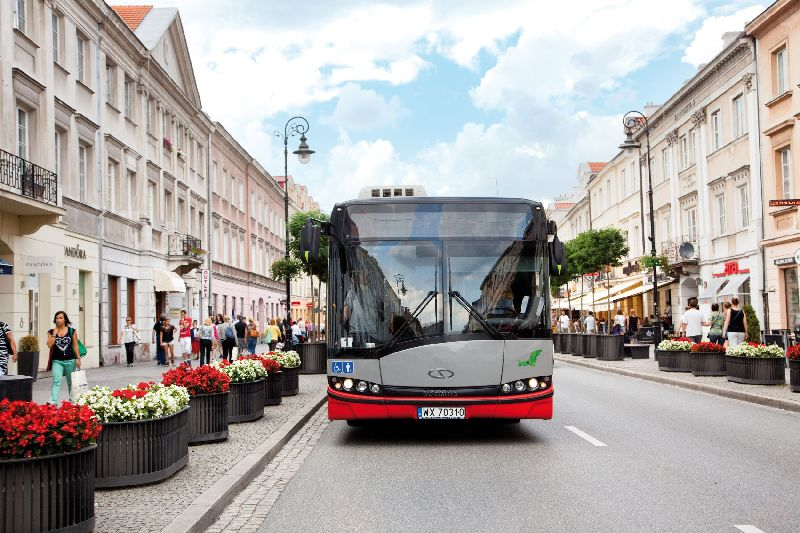
The first Solaris Urbino 18 Hybrid Allison.

In the Autumn of 2006 on the trade fairs in Hannover the world premier occurred of the Solaris Urbino 18 Hybrid with hybrid power. The model was made with the cooperation with Allison Transmission and Cummins, which already had been engaged in previous hybrid bus models in North America. The main part of the model is the Cummins ISLe4 engine with 8.9 litre displacement which generates 248 kW (340 HP) of power. The second main part of this model is the EP50 system of Allison Transmission with the Allison Ev50 engine. The concept is created by the use of one diesel engine and two electric engines with each having 75 kW of power output, which links with the Ev DRIVE module. The system also uses the produced energy when braking, which is accumulated in a nickel-metal hydride batteries located on the roof in the front of the vehicle. The prototype appeared in mid-2006 and went into production in 2007. The location of the electric and diesel engines is in the front part of the bus between the two doors.

The first Solaris Urbino Hybrid 18 was sold in 2006 to Dresden. In 2007 3 buses were sold to Leipzig and Bochum (delivered in January 2008) in Germany and Lenzburg in the Swiss canton of Aargau. In 2008 the modernised model came to Bern, Glonn, Hannover, Munich and Poznań. In 2009 a test vehicle of the Solaris company was given to PKM Sosnowiec from 2008.

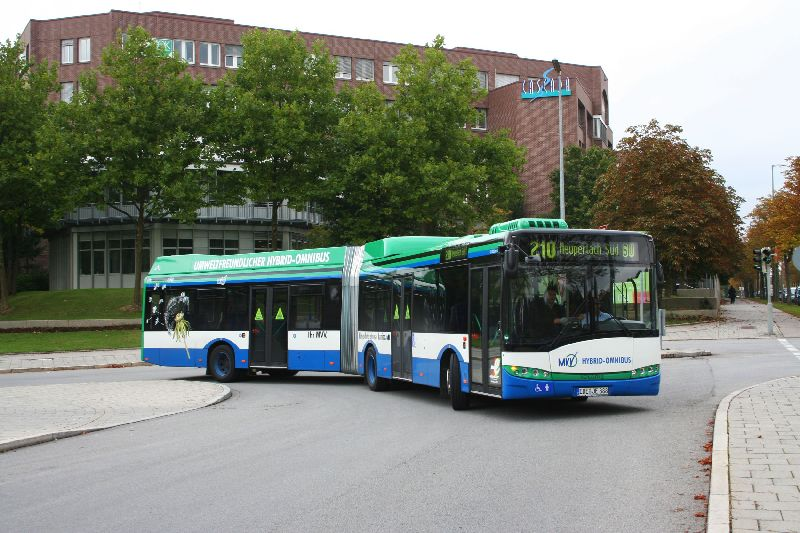
Solaris Urbino 18 Hybrid Allison

In second half of 2008 the Solaris Urbino 18 Hybrid model went through several levels of modernisation and now it is considered to be at the second generation by the producer. Most of the changes are that of the power system of the electric hybrid engine, making a smaller and lighter engine, the Cummins ISBe5 250B with a volume of 6.7 litre and the power of 178 kW. The changes meant even lower fuel consumption - the older engine has reduced fuel usage by 15% compared to purely diesel propulsion while the new engine saves 23-24%. Thanks to further optimisation the Solaris is planning to reduce fuel consumption by 30%. Due to a lighter engine, the other power systems, like the batteries and Dual Power Inverter Module which are on the roof, work at an increased rate and produce more power. Due to this the model has also undergone a makeover of the general body, such as the aerodynamics, meaning only an air conditioning module can be fitted on the front of the bus. The estimated time for future modernisation, when new modules will be able to be added, is said to be about in 6–7 years, with an average usage of 60000 km per year.

The hybrid power system of the second generation without includes besides the diesel engine the following elements: Ev, batteries, DPIM, and a control module. The Ev system looks like an ordinary transmission where the torque summation of the internal combustion engine and the electric motor is performed. It consists of two electric motors, two synchronous clutches and three planetary gears. Rechargeable nickel-metal hydride batteries weighing 410 kg store energy recovered during the braking process. By this they do not require additional charging from external power sources. The service life of the battery set is about 6 years depending on the characteristics of the bus. Dual inverter module DPIM (Dual Power Inverter Module) consists of two modules of AC/DC - DC/AC weighing 75 kg in total. It is cooled with oil. The control unit consists of 2 control modules of the Allison 1000/2000 series. The first of these controls manage the operation of the hybrid engine, while the second unit is responsible for cooperation of the other vehicle systems.

All axles used come from ZF. Electrical system are based on CAN-Bus.

=== Solaris Urbino 18 Hybrid MetroStyle ===
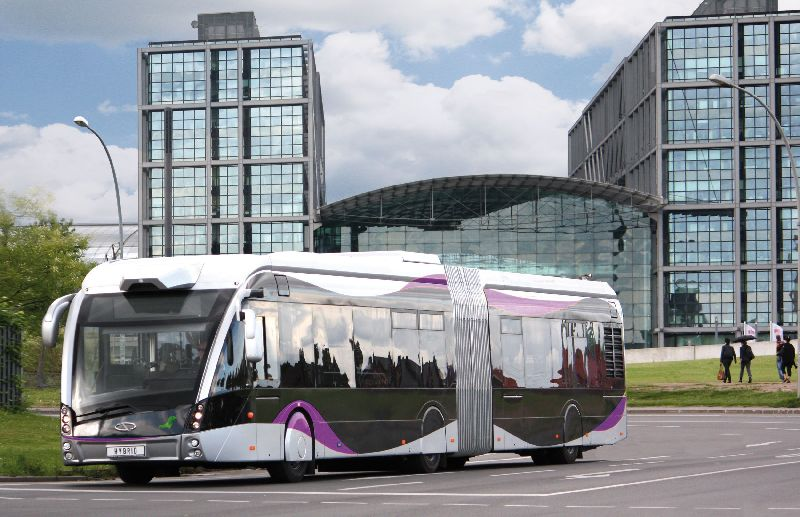
Solaris Urbino 18 Hybrid MetroStyle.

In 2010, a prototype model of the Solaris Urbino 18 Hybrid MetroStyle with a higher service standard adapted to support rapid and dedicated bus network BHNS (French Bus Haut à Niveau de Service, High Level Service Bus) of the Type RTD in Paris. However the model was only presented in February 2011, when the company began its annual Transdev tests in Paris. The bus model Solaris Urbino 18 Hybrid MetroStyle in 2011, was also tested in Grudziądz in Poland.

The market premiere took place in mid-October 2011, during the exhibition RNTP in Strasbourg in France (October 12) and the Trade Fair Busworld Kortrijk 2011 in Belgium (October 21). The bus model has a completely new design of the front and rear panels, referring to the Solaris tram Tramino styling. It results from the wishes of the consumer to visually resemble a bus tram. The drive system uses a hybrid system of the Allison II Generation.

The bus has the 1-2-2-2 door configuration. The end of the bus has been designed to the style of the tram Tramino. The bus is 18 metres long. The front of the bus, including the roof has a more elegant and bow style making the bus look more streamline. There are covers over the wheels. The bus was fitted with Hübner lighting system which can be turned on at night to give orange lights under the bus.

=== Solaris Urbino 18 Hybrid Vossloh Kiepe ===
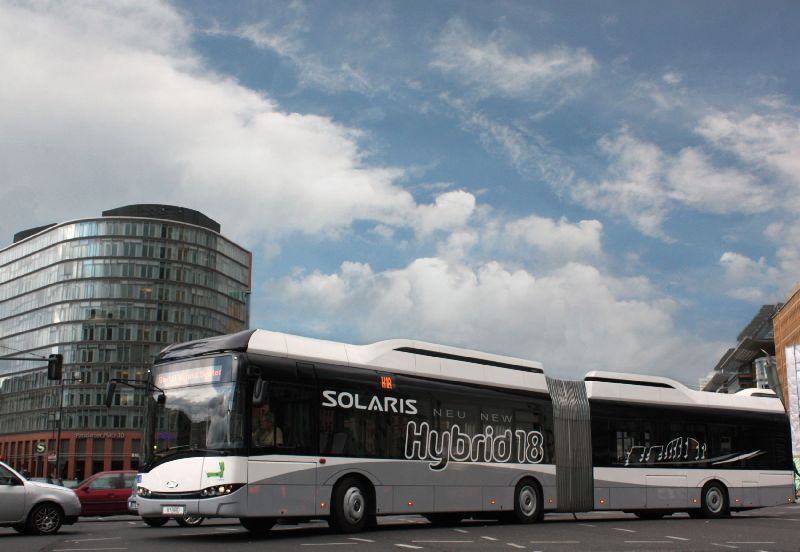
Solaris Urbino 18 Hybrid Vossloh Kiepe

In the autumn of 2010 debuted the new German company Vossloh Kiepe hybrid system model. It can be distinguished by additional overhead panels inside. In the engine compartment next to the Cummins engine is an electric traction system, which allows itself to be turned off by the use of the hybrid engine.

The following systems were eliminated to work with the diesel powered engine: air compressor, radiator coolers, additional pump and air conditioning battery. There is an optional electric passenger and driver air conditioning system.

In the doors, produced by the Bode company, there had been installed new electric engines in the vals, and not over the doorway. Therefore, the whole mechanism is lighter, easier to build and upkeep and the system takes up less space.

There has been fitted a two screen information panel which shows a visualisation of the state of the hybrid power system.

The vehicle has a fitted router in the chassis, which allows connection to the system of the Vossloh Kiepe company, in the need to read the state of the hybrid system.

=== Solaris Urbino 18 DIWAhybrid (Voith) ===
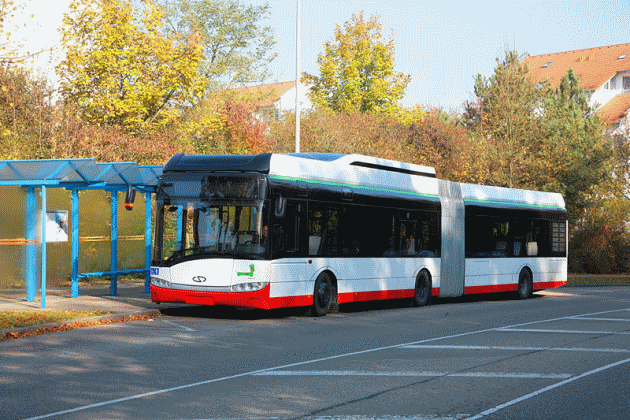
Solaris Urbino 18 DIWAhybrid (Voith)

At the end of 2010 the new model Solaris Urbino DIWAhybrid was fitted with a hybrid power system from Voith Turbo. In the second half of 2011 the first bus with this system was delivered to the Bogestra passenger transportation company in Bochum. The first deliver will include 10 models of the bus. It is presumed that 50 buses will have the system.

The vehicle is powered by a Cummins ISB engine with a capacity of 6.7 dm^{3} and maximum power of 250 hp and meets the EEV emissions standard. Together with an electric motor engine with a maximum power of 150 kW.

In the drive line thanks to recuperation during braking the kinetic energy is converted into electrical energy, accumulated in supercapacitors placed on the roof. Supercapacitors are composed of five 125-volt modules that can store energy of 0.5 kWh. Their total weight is 410 kg.

Despite being heavier by 600 kg, compared to the standard Solaris Urbino 18, Urbino 18 DIWAhybrid model can take 161 passengers, with 51 seated.

== Users of the Solaris Urbino 18 Hybrid ==
Country	City	Transport Company	Hybrid System	Year of Delivery	Bus number or registration	Number of models (in the company)	Number of models (in the country)
France	Paris	Transdev (BHNS)	MetroStyle – Allison II	2011	n/a	1	3/9
France	Roissy-en-France	Transdev Aeroport Services	Allison II	2009	AA-852-QH	1	3/9
France	Strasbourg	Compagnie des Transports Strasbourgeois	Allison II	2008	400	1	3/9
France	Saint Denis, Réunion	CommunautéIntercommunale du Nord de la Réunion (CINOR)	b.d.	2013	n/a	0/6	3/9
Germany	Bochum	Bogestra	Allison I	2007	0778	1	74
Germany	Bochum	Bogestra	Allison II	2010	1061-1063	3	74
Germany	Bochum	Bogestra	Voith	2010-2011	1064, 1161-1170	11	74
Germany	Bremen	BSAG	Allison II	2008	4998	1	74
Germany	Drezden	DVB	Allison I	2006	460 001-4	1	74
Germany	Düsseldorf	Rheinbahn	Allison II	2010-2011	8401-8407	7	74
Germany	Frankfurt am Main	Stadtwerke Verkehrsgesellschaft	Allison II	2011	400	1	74
Germany	Glonn	Ettenhuber (MVV)	Allison II	2008	EBE-JE 888	1	74
Germany	Hannover	üstra Hannoversche Verkehrsbetriebe AG	Allison II	2008, 2011, 2013, 2014, 2017	8300, 8301-8310, 8311-8319, 8320-8326, 8327-8336	37	74
Germany	Herten	Vestische Straßenbahnen GmbH	Voith	2011	2301-2302	2	74
Germany	Leipzig	LVB	Allison I	2007	7	1	74
Germany	Munich	Münchner Verkehrsgesellschaft mbH	Allison II	2008	5340	1	74
Germany	Neuss	Stadtwerke Neuss GmbH	Allison II	2010	2010	1	74
Germany	Neuss	Stadtwerke Neuss GmbH	Voith	2011	2101-2106	6	74
Norway	Oslo	UniBuss AS	Allison II	2011	1200-1204	5	5
Poland	Poznań	Miejskie Przedsiębiorstwo Komunikacyjne w Poznaniu	Allison II	2008	1890	1	7
Poland	Sosnowiec	Przedsiębiorstwo Komunikacji Miejskiej Sosnowiec	Allison II	2009	500	1	7
Poland	Sosnowiec	Przedsiębiorstwo Komunikacji Miejskiej Sosnowiec	Allison I	2011	505	1	7
Poland	Warsaw	Miejskie Zakłady Autobusowe w Warszawie	Allison II	2011/2012	8396-8399	4	7
Switzerland	La Chaux-de-Fonds	Transports Régionaux Neuchâtelois	Allison II	2012	n/a	0/7	1/8
Switzerland	Lenzburg	Regionalbus Lenzburg AG	Allison II	2009	466	1	1/8
Amount						90/103	
For: 9.10.2012
