= Bolechowo, Greater Poland Voivodeship =

Bolechowo
- Village
- Location within Poland
- Coordinates: 52°32′N 16°59′E
- Country: Poland
- Voivodeship: Greater Poland
- County: Poznań
- Gmina: Czerwonak

Population
  - Total: 1,250
- Time zone: UTC+1 (CET)
  - Summer (DST): UTC+2 (CEST)
- Vehicle registration: PZ

Bolechowo [bɔlɛˈxɔvɔ] is a village in the administrative district of Gmina Czerwonak, within Poznań County, Greater Poland Voivodeship, in west-central Poland.

Bolechowo is the seat of Solaris Bus & Coach, a Polish bus, coach, trolleybus and tram manufacturer. Solaris opened a solar powered Warehouse Hall and Charging Park on 29 September 2022, which will be used to test charging and discharging of e-vehicles.

== History ==
Nine Polish citizens were murdered by Nazi Germany in the village during World War II.
