= Coach (bus) =

Bus used for longer-distance service

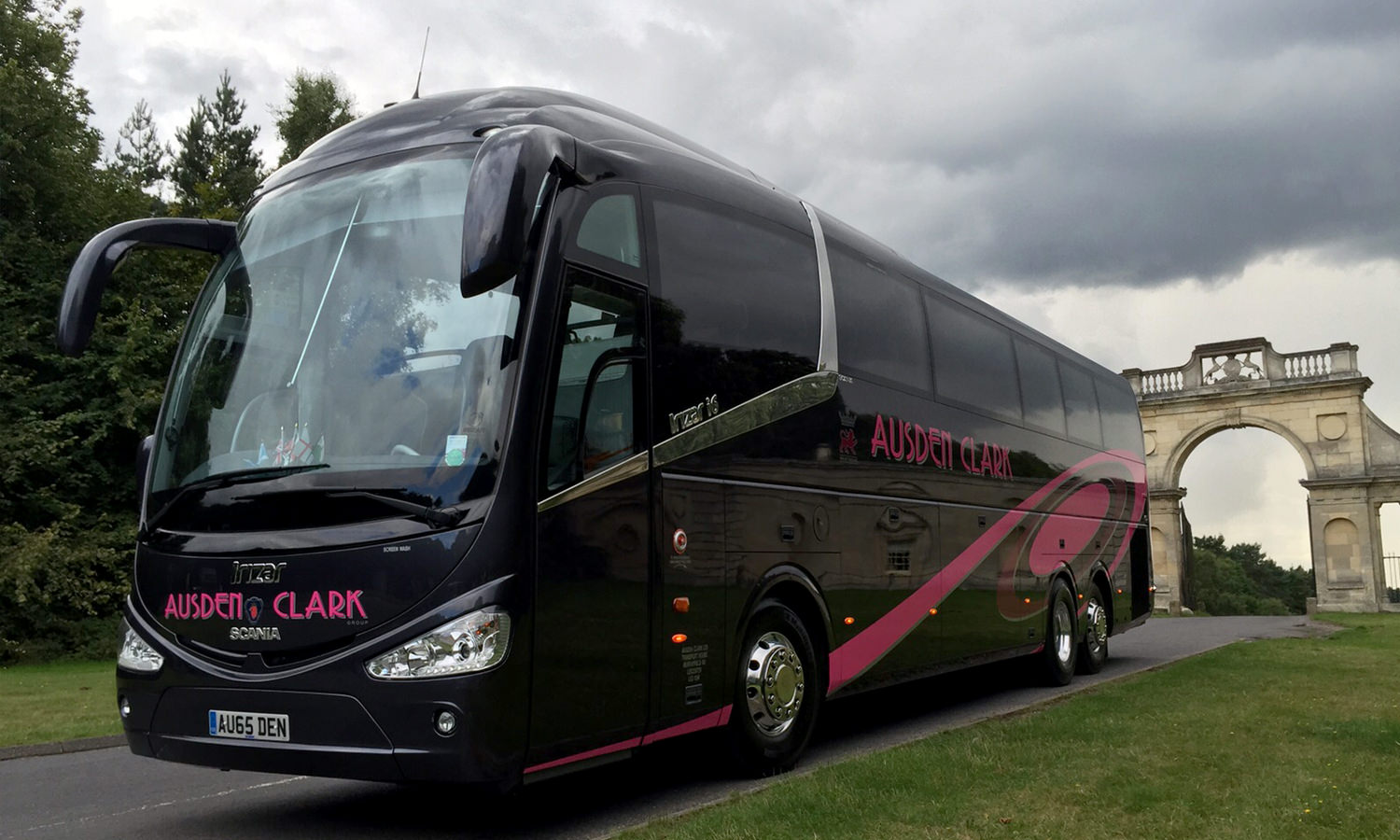
Scania Irizar i6 coach in black and pink Ausden Clark Executive livery

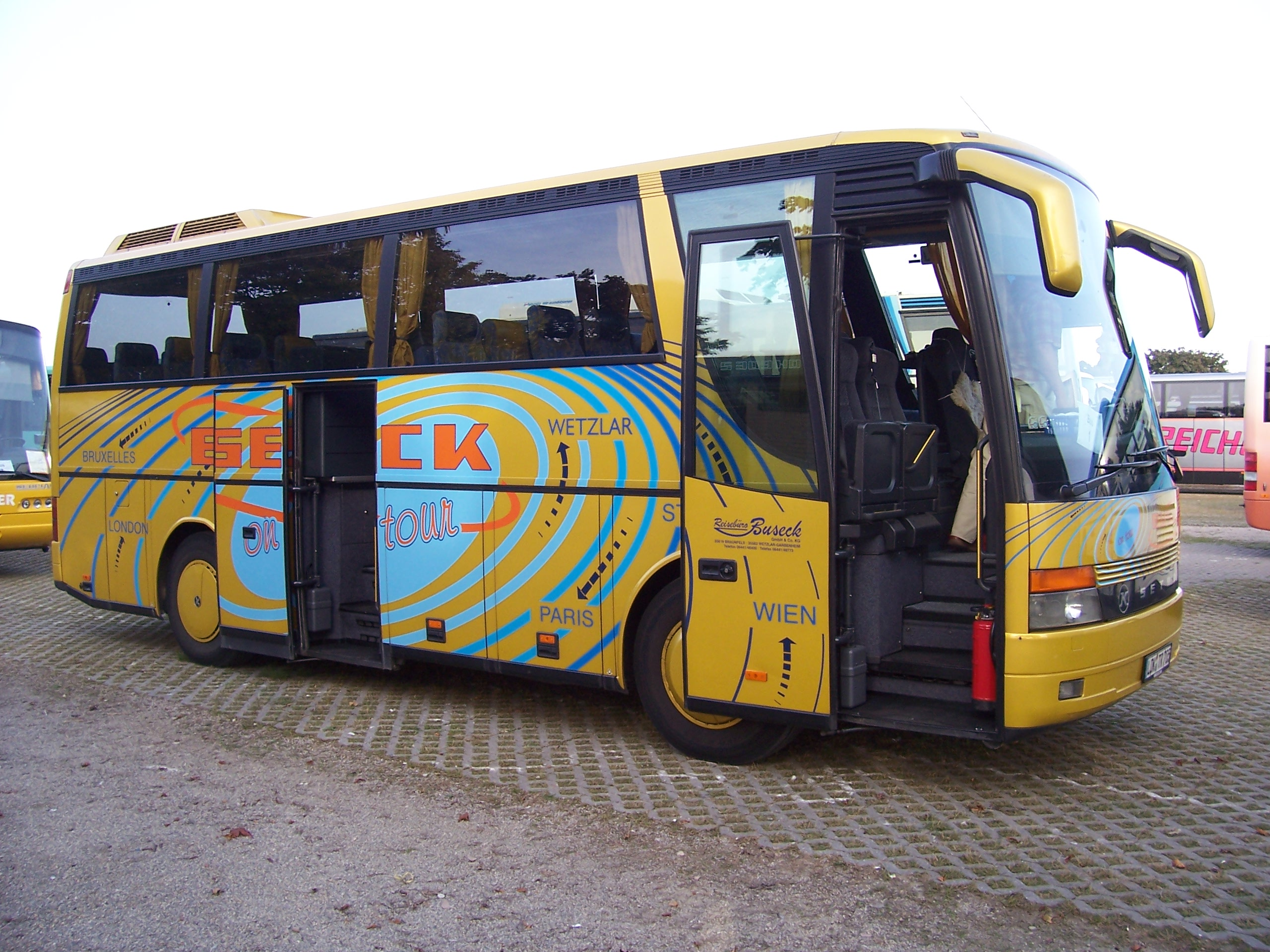
Setra mid-size coach

A coach (also known as a motorcoach or coach bus) is a type of bus built for longer distance service, in contrast to transit buses that are typically used for shorter journeys within a single metropolitan region. Often used for touring, intercity, and international bus service, coaches are also used for private charter for various purposes.

Deriving the name from horse-drawn carriages and stagecoaches that carried passengers, luggage, and mail, modern motor coaches are almost always high-floor buses, with separate luggage hold mounted below the passenger compartment. In contrast to transit buses, motor coaches typically feature forward-facing seating, with no provision for standing. Other accommodations may include onboard restrooms, televisions, and overhead luggage space.

The name used for this type of bus varies between countries. In the United States they are officially designated as motorcoach ("a bus designed with an elevated passenger deck located over a baggage compartment") as well as being referred to as coach bus. In many other countries including Australia, Ireland and the United Kingdom they are called coach in the English language. In Japan they are called highway buses, while those operating airport services are called airport limousines or limousine buses.

== History ==
=== Background ===
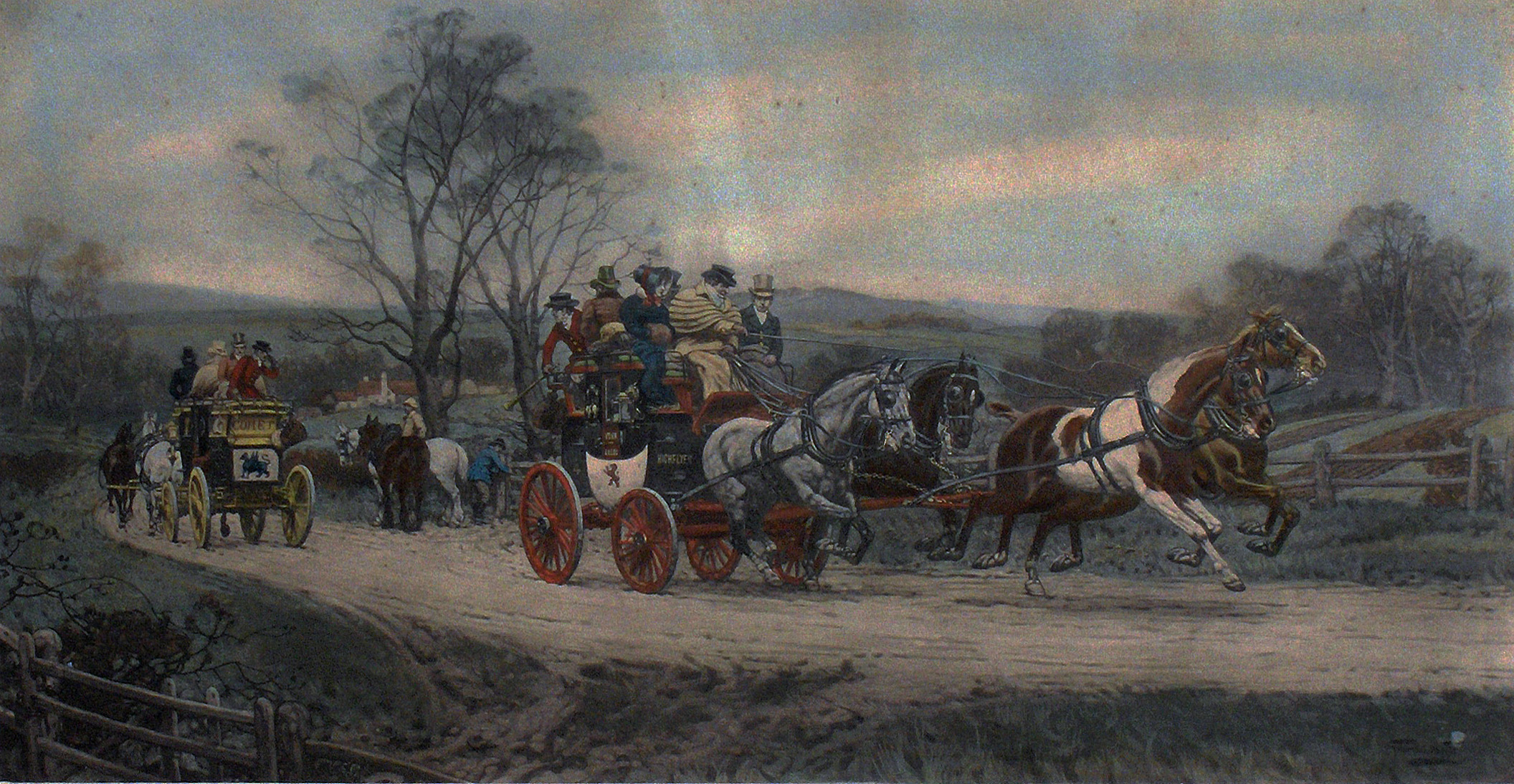
Early coach drawn by horses

Horse-drawn chariots and carriages ("coaches") were used by the wealthy and powerful where the roads were of a high enough standard from possibly 3000 BC. In Hungary, during the reign of King Matthias Corvinus in the 15th century, the wheelwrights of Kocs began to build a horse-drawn vehicle with steel-spring suspension. This "cart of Kocs" as the Hungarians called it (Hungarian: kocsi szekér) soon became popular all over Europe. The imperial post service employed the first horse-drawn mail coaches in Europe since Roman times in 1650, and as they started in the town of Kocs, the use of these mail coaches gave rise to the term "coach". Stagecoaches (drawn by horses) were used for transport between cities from about 1500 in Great Britain until displaced by the arrival of the railways.

One of the earliest motorized vehicles was the charabanc, which was used for short journeys and excursions until the early years of the 20th century. The first "motor coaches" were purchased by operators of those horse-drawn vehicles in the early 20th century by operators such as Royal Blue Coach Services, who purchased their first charabanc in 1913 and were running 72 coaches by 1926.

== Features ==
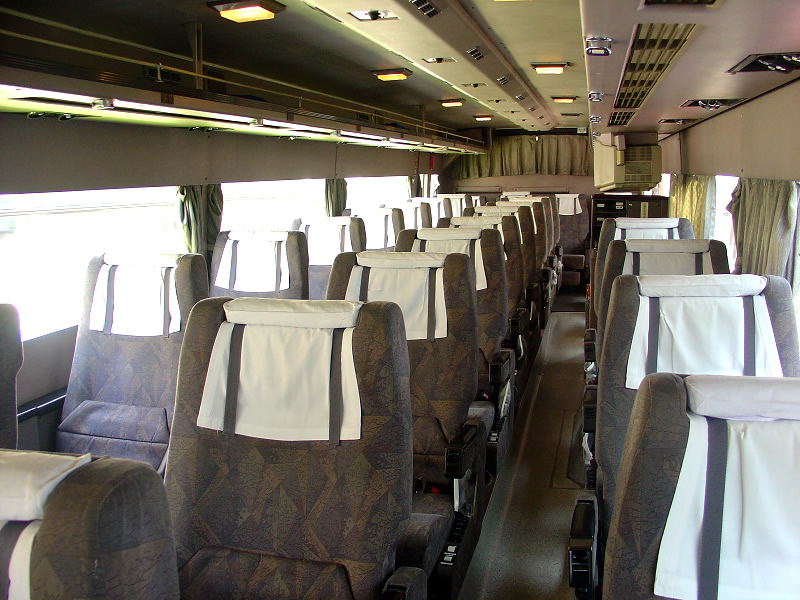
Interiors of coaches include many features not found in buses intended for shorter travel.

Coaches are designed for comfort, as passengers are onboard for significant periods of time on long journeys, or the hirer desires a high standard of comfort on shorter trips.

They can vary considerably in quality: some higher-specification coaches feature luxury seats and refreshments, while others may only have the bare essentials such as non-reclining highback seats and an underfloor baggage compartment. Coaches typically have only a single, narrow door, but some may have two doors - it can be a tradeoff between faster passenger boarding/alighting times and having 2-4 extra seats.

Some coaches are designed for commuter services, which are typically farther than local transit routes. As such, these coaches may have amenities rarely seen on transit buses, such as onboard restrooms, but sparser than coaches meant for long-distance travel.

Seats are normally in a configuration of 2 seats either side of a central aisle - or in premium coaches there can be 2 seats on one side of the aisle and 1 seat on the other side (for example, "excellent" and "premium" class Intercity/Express buses in South Korea), or even 1 seat either side of the aisle in luxury coaches. Other seating layouts can be found on coaches built for a specific purpose (e.g. some overnight buses in Japan have 3 single seats with 2 narrow aisles).

Some characteristics include:

- Air conditioning is installed on virtually every modern coach.
- Comfortable highback seats - covered in cloth/fabric or leatherette (or even leather in some luxury coaches) - that recline and can include a fold-out tray table and/or beverage holder, and armrests.
- Luggage racks above the seats for storing carry-on bags.
- Luggage compartment, accessed from outside the vehicle, under the main floor (or sometimes at the rear)
- Personal reading light and adjustable air conditioning outlet above the seat
- On-board restrooms fitted with chemical toilets, hand basins and soap or hand sanitizer
- On some coaches, on-board entertainment including movies may be shown to passengers
- On-board refreshment service provided by an attendant or a vending machine
- Wheelchair accessible. This is generally provided using a wheelchair lift, although some coaches are in a partial (or full) double-deck layout able to accommodate wheelchair(s) and optionally a small number of regular seats on the lower level, with access by a portable or foldout ramp, with the remainder of the lower level normally used for luggage storage and a toilet.
- Curtains or blinds, useful on overnight services or to block harsh sunlight
- Onboard AC power, USB charging ports and Wi-Fi access
- Seat belt for safety

== Manufacture ==
Coaches, like buses, may be fully built by integrated manufacturers, or a separate chassis consisting of only an engine, wheels and basic frame may be delivered to a coachwork factory for a body to be added. A few coaches are built with monocoque bodies without a chassis frame. Integrated manufacturers (most of whom also supply chassis) include Autosan, Scania, Fuso, and Alexander Dennis. Major coachwork providers (some of whom can build their own chassis) include Van Hool, Neoplan, Marcopolo, Irizar, MCI, Prevost, Denning Manufacturing in Australia and Designline in New Zealand.

== Regulations ==
In some European countries following the 1958 type certification treaty, coach (that is vehicle of type M2 or M3) type certification is regulated by regulation number 107 from the UNECE. In the U.S., commercial drivers of motorcoaches are regulated by the Federal Motor Carrier Safety Administration (FMCSA).

Drivers of buses and coaches require a commercial driver's license (a higher class of license than is required to drive a car). Many states/countries also require bus/coach drivers to obtain an additional certification to carry paying passengers - for example the United Kingdom and the European Union require a Driver Certificate of Professional Competence (Driver CPC)

Seat belts for drivers and all passengers are now legally required in many countries, including the United Kingdom. Refer to: Overview of Seat Belt Legislation by Country.

== Image gallery ==
=== Modern coaches ===
A representative selection of vehicles currently (or recently) in use in different parts of the world.

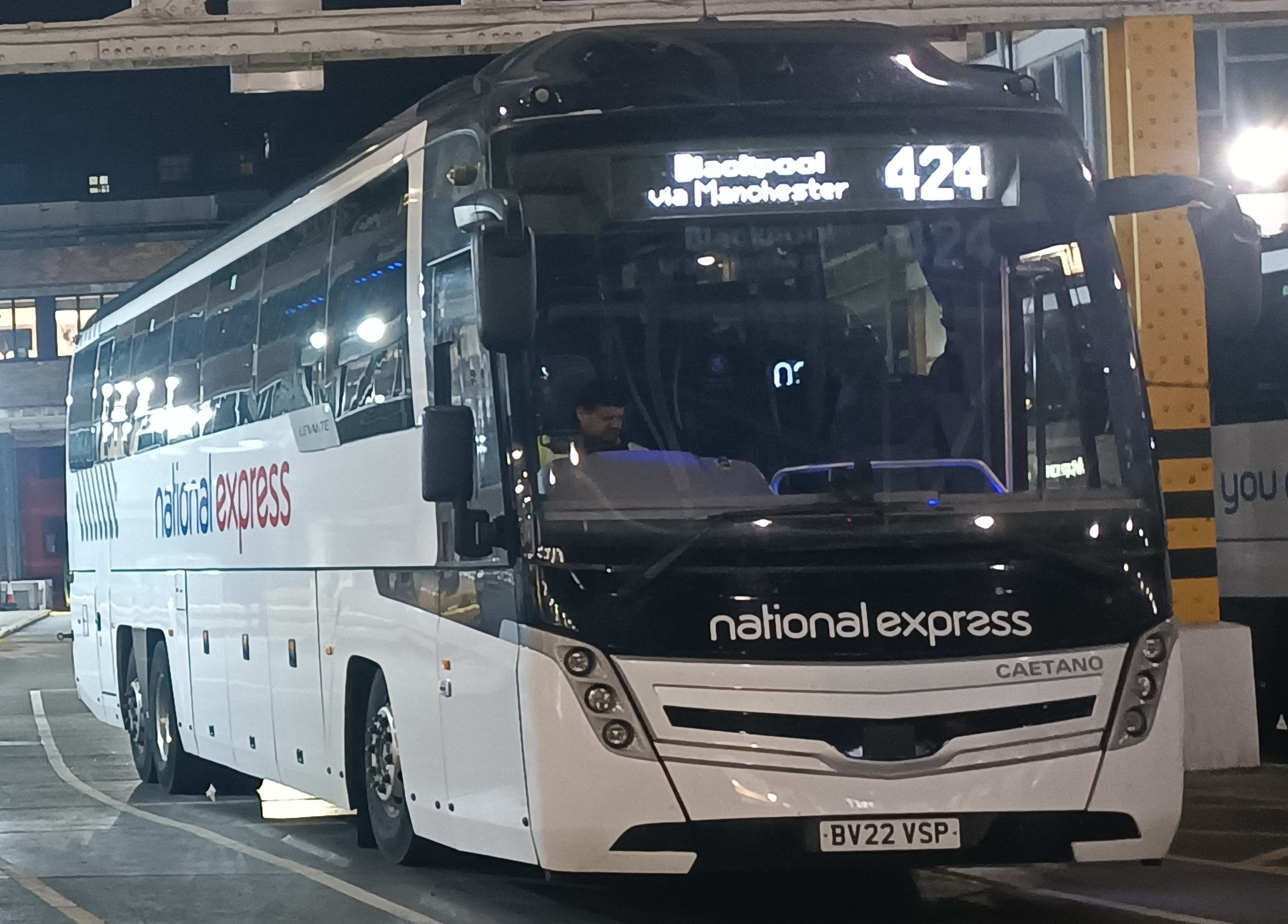
Caetano Levante 3 bodied Scania K410EB6 operated by National Express

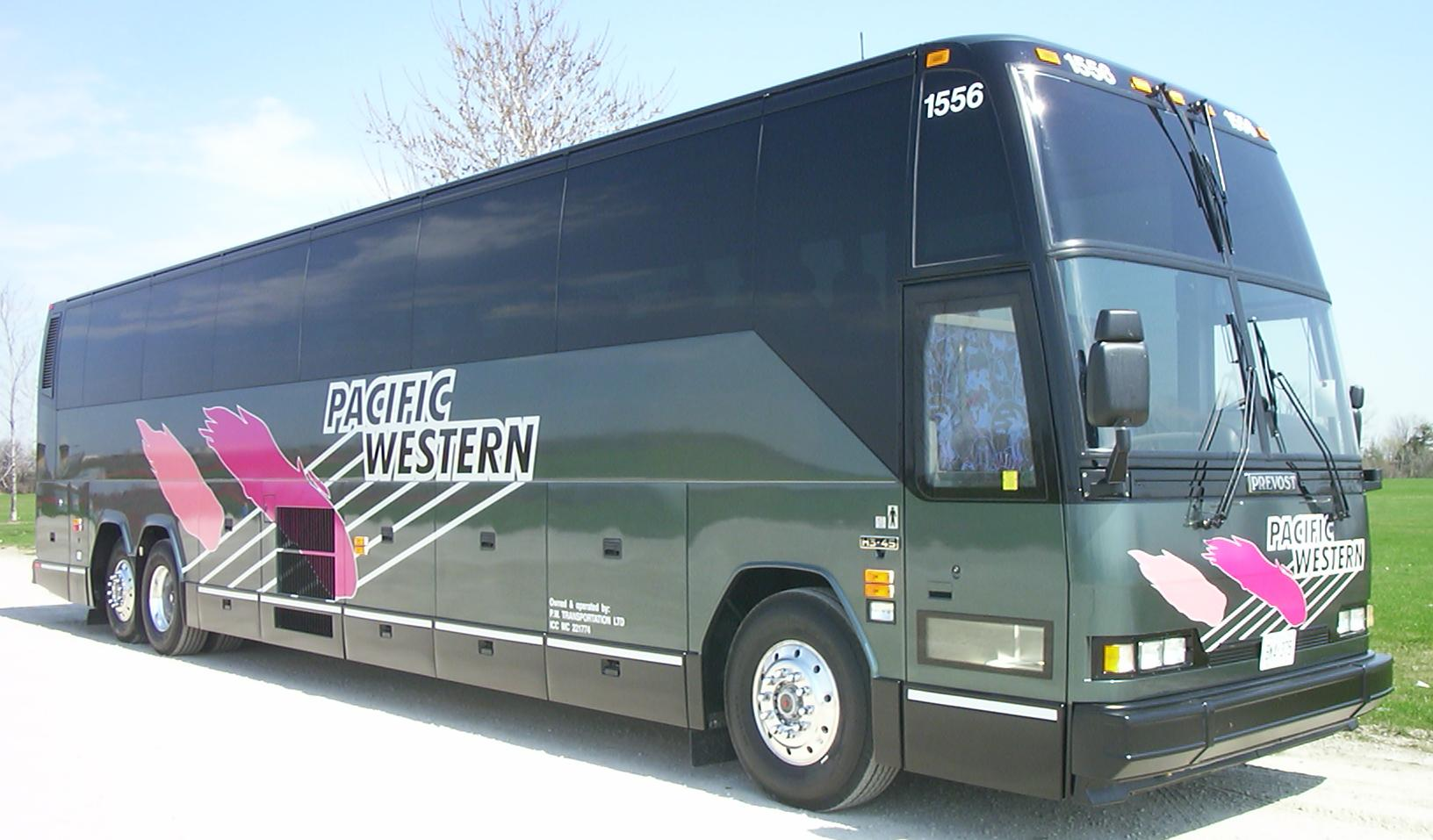
A 56-passenger Prevost coach in Canada

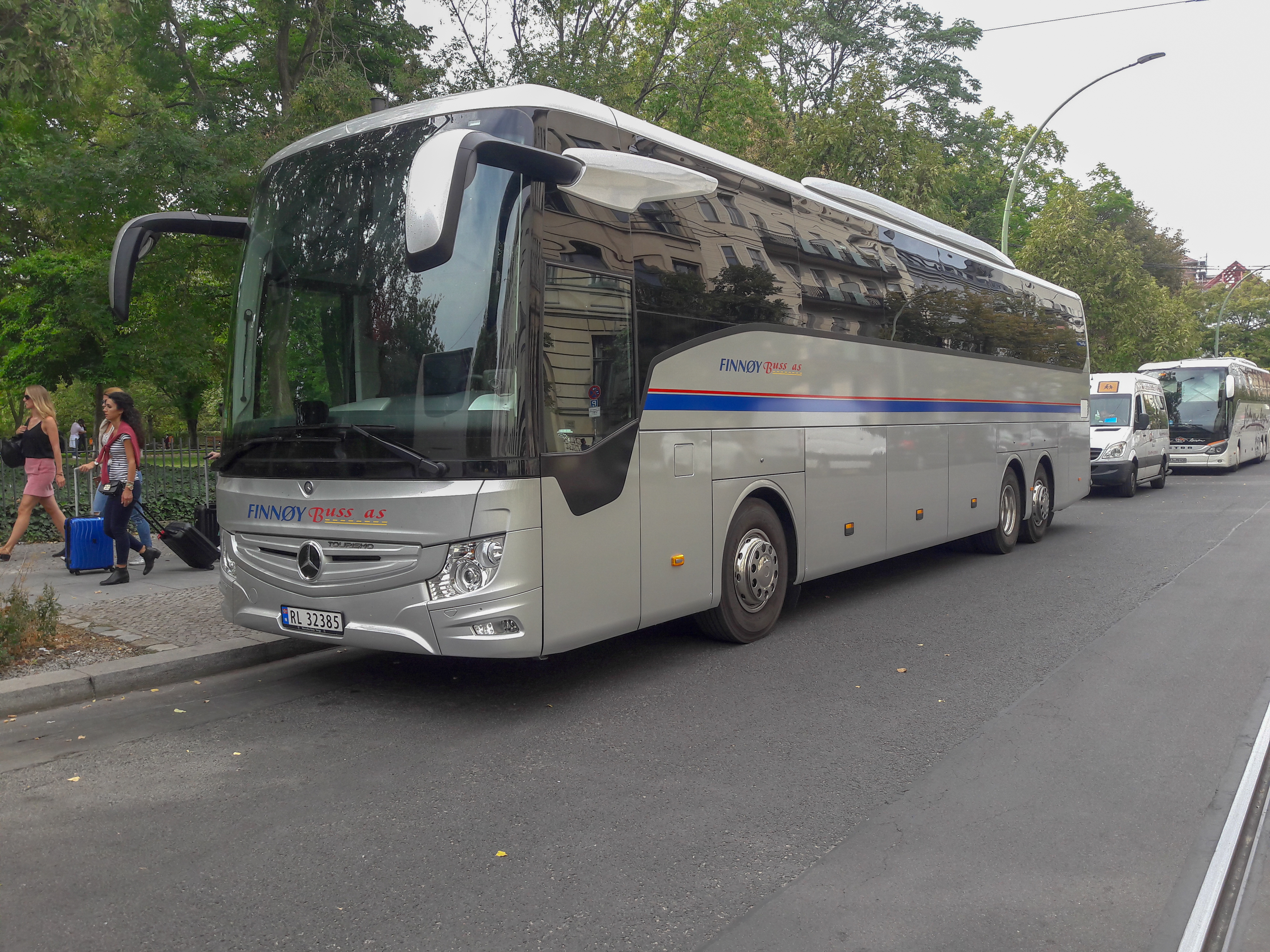
A Mercedes-Benz Tourismo in Berlin, Germany

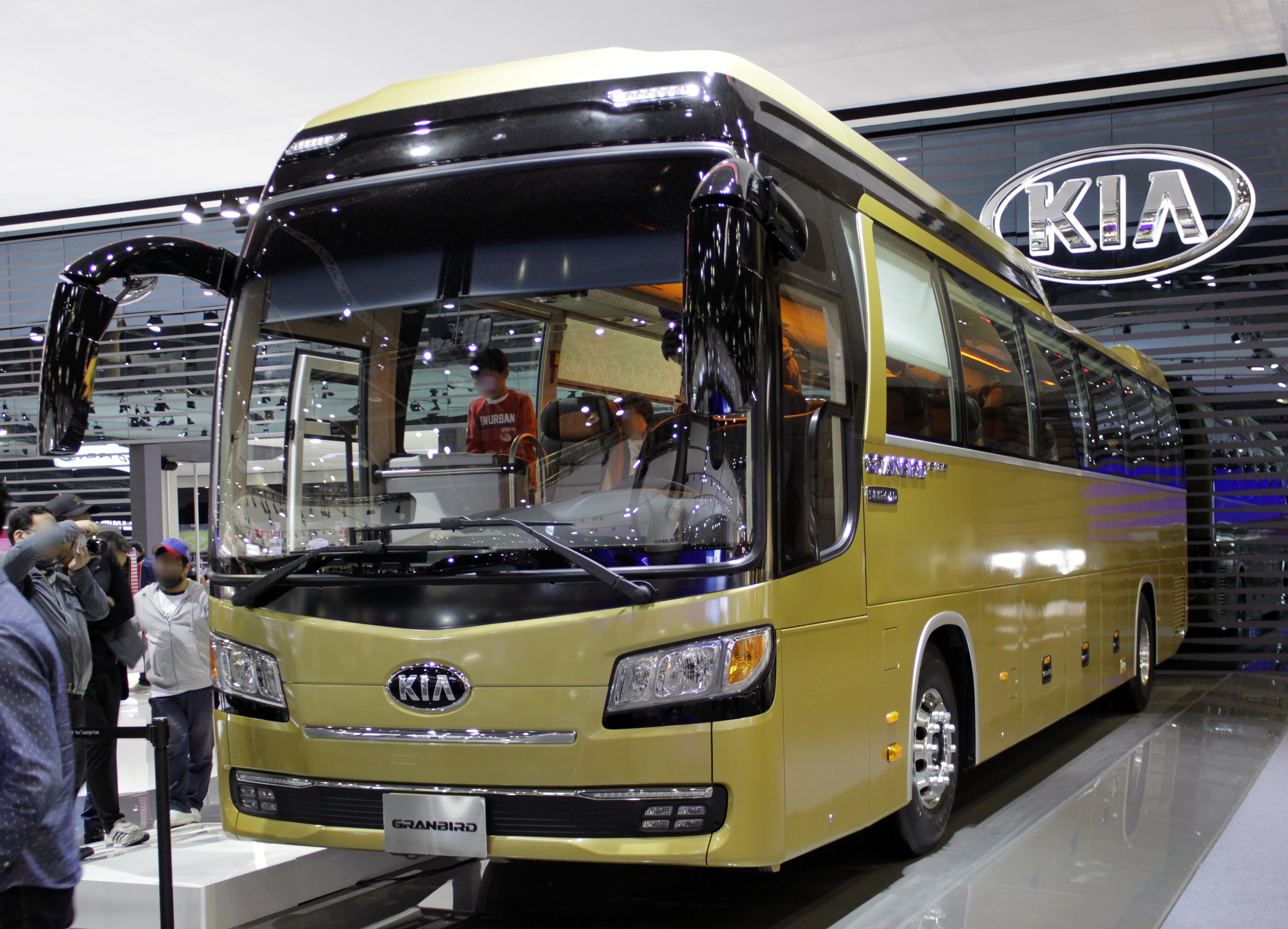
A Kia Granbird Silkroad from 2015 at the Seoul Motor Show

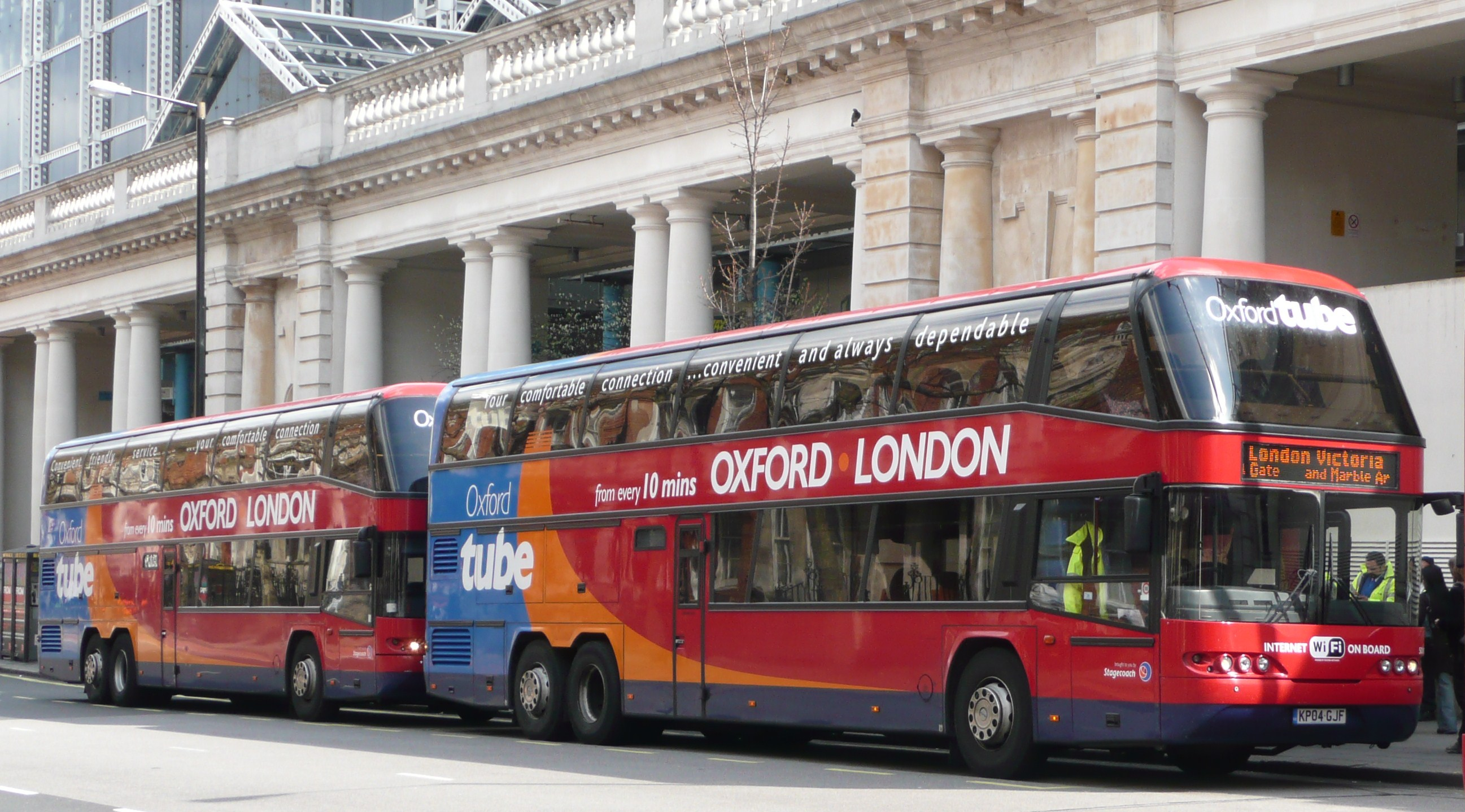
Double-decker Neoplan Skyliners with Oxford Tube bodies

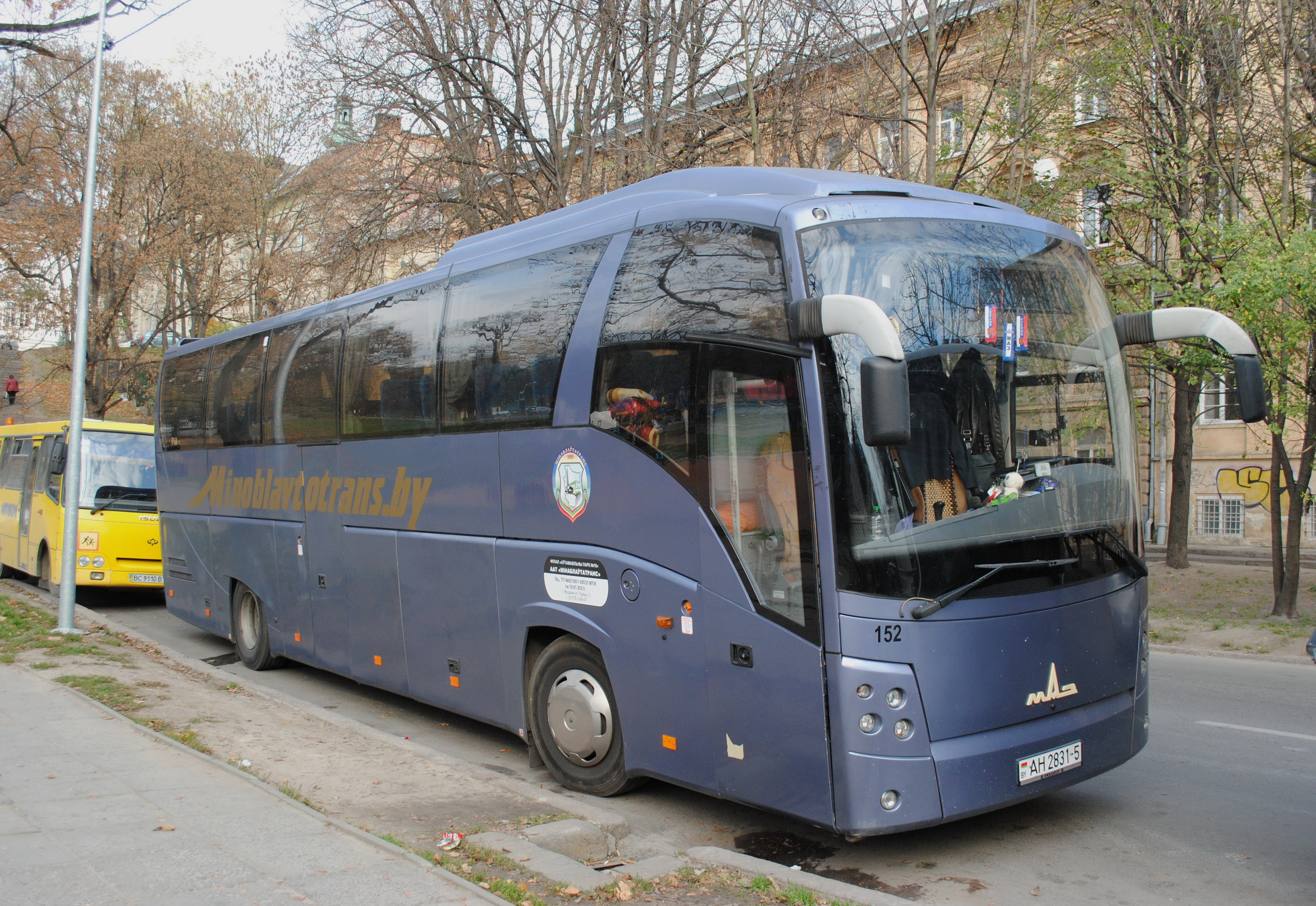
MAZ-251 in Minsk, Belarus

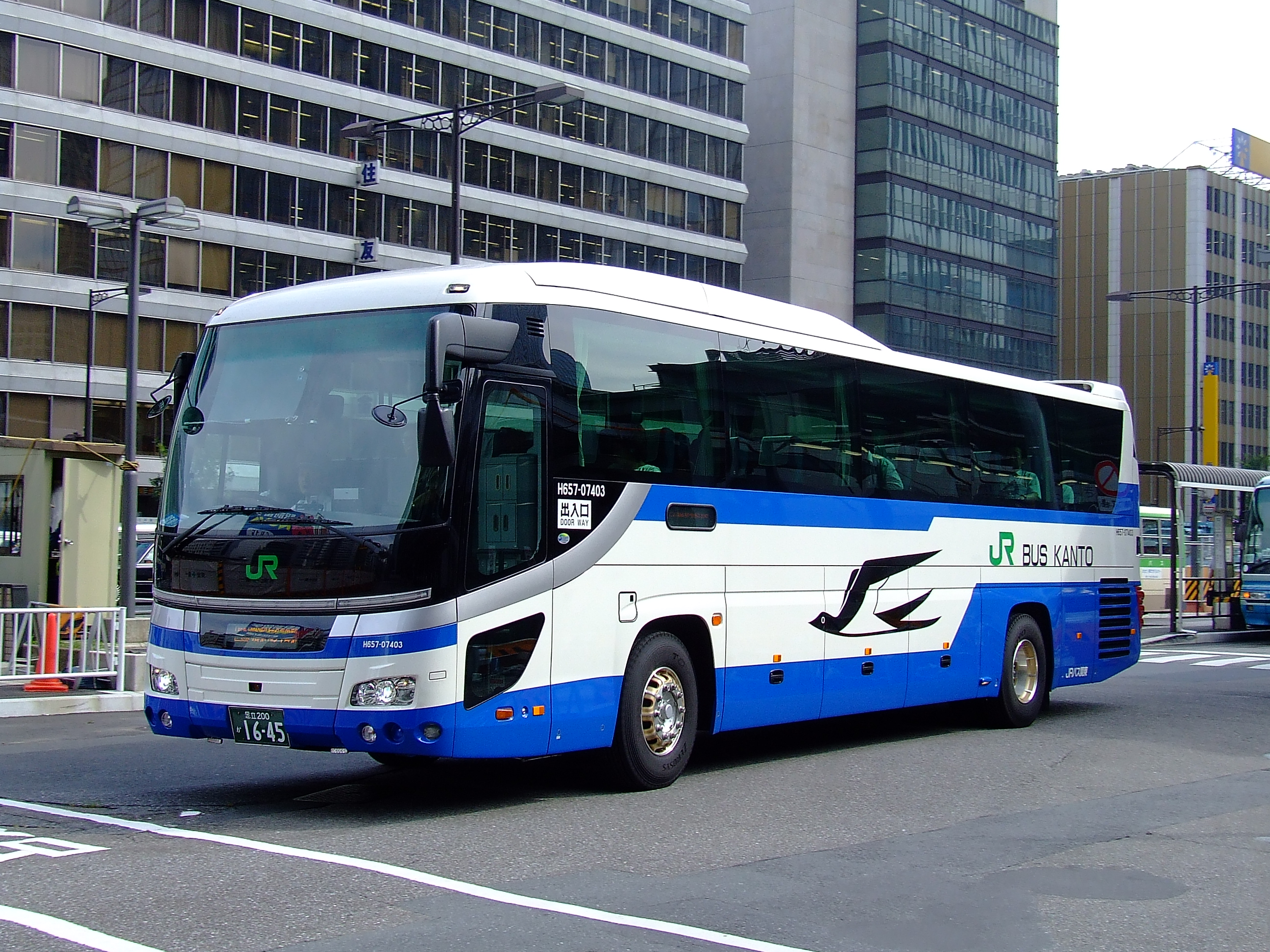
Hino S'elega in Tokyo, Japan

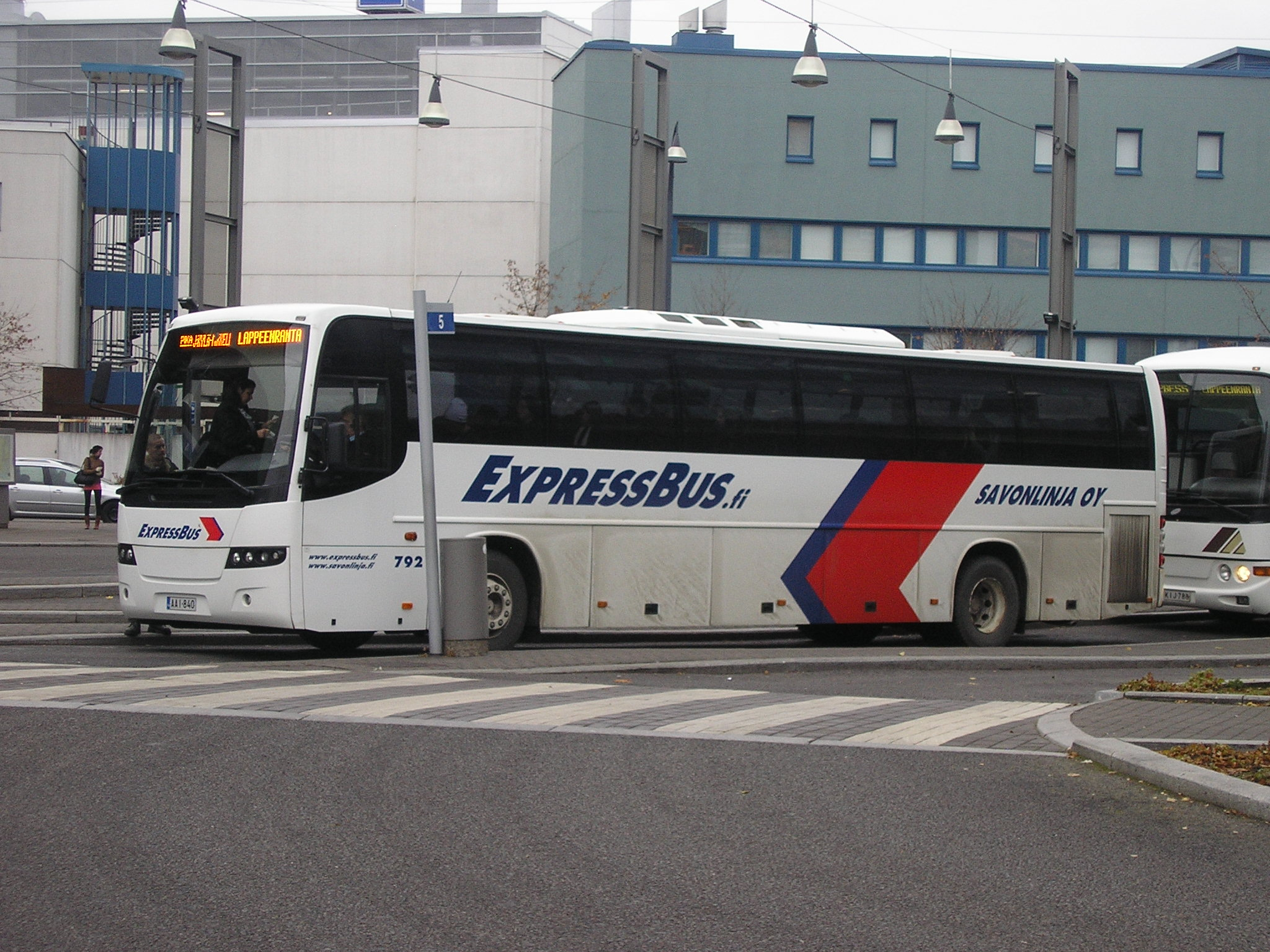
Volvo B7R / 9700S (no. 792, AAI-840, 2006) operated by ExpressBus Savonlinja at Jyväskylä bus station

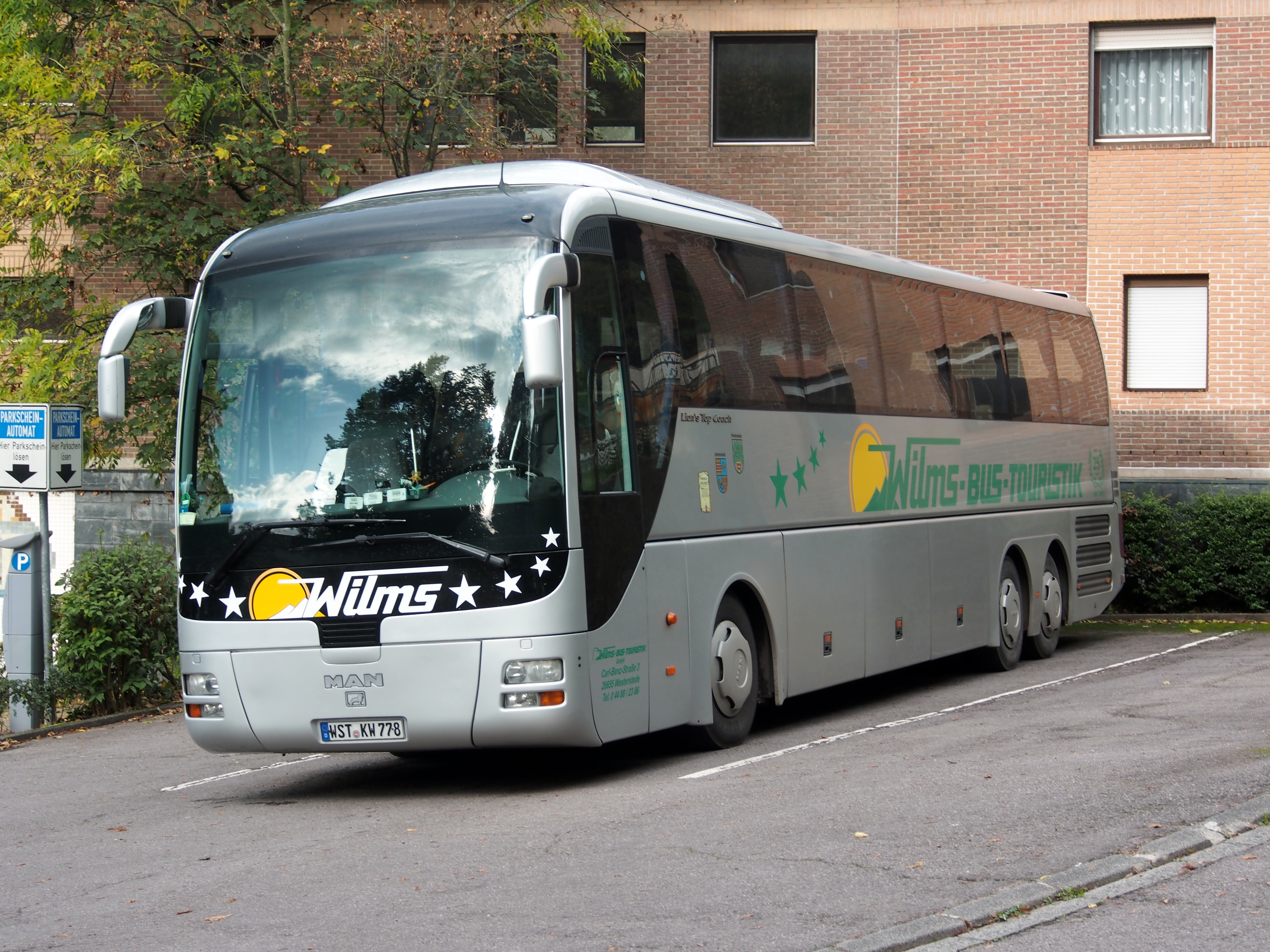
MAN Lion's coach L

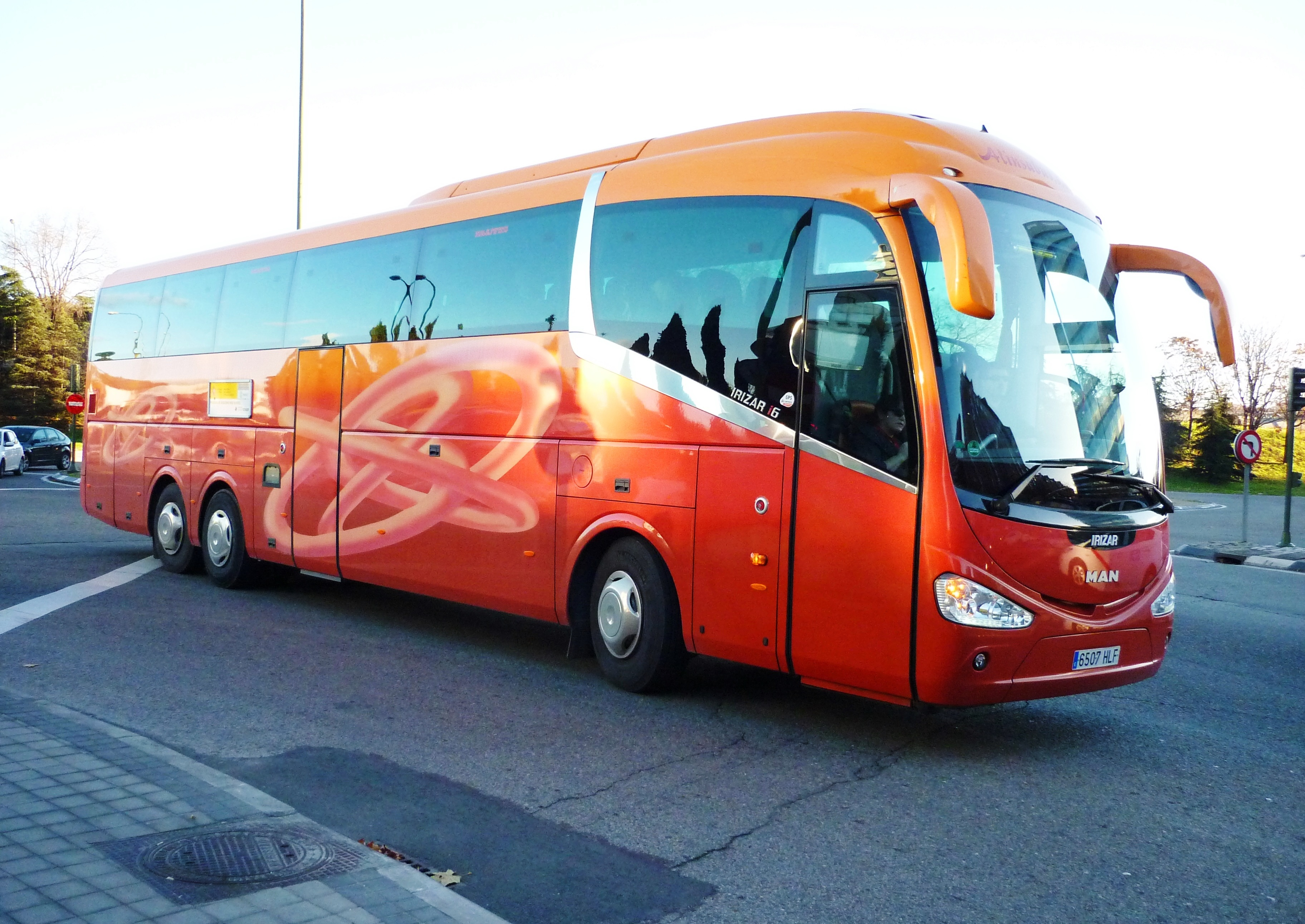
An Irizar i6 built on a MAN chassis

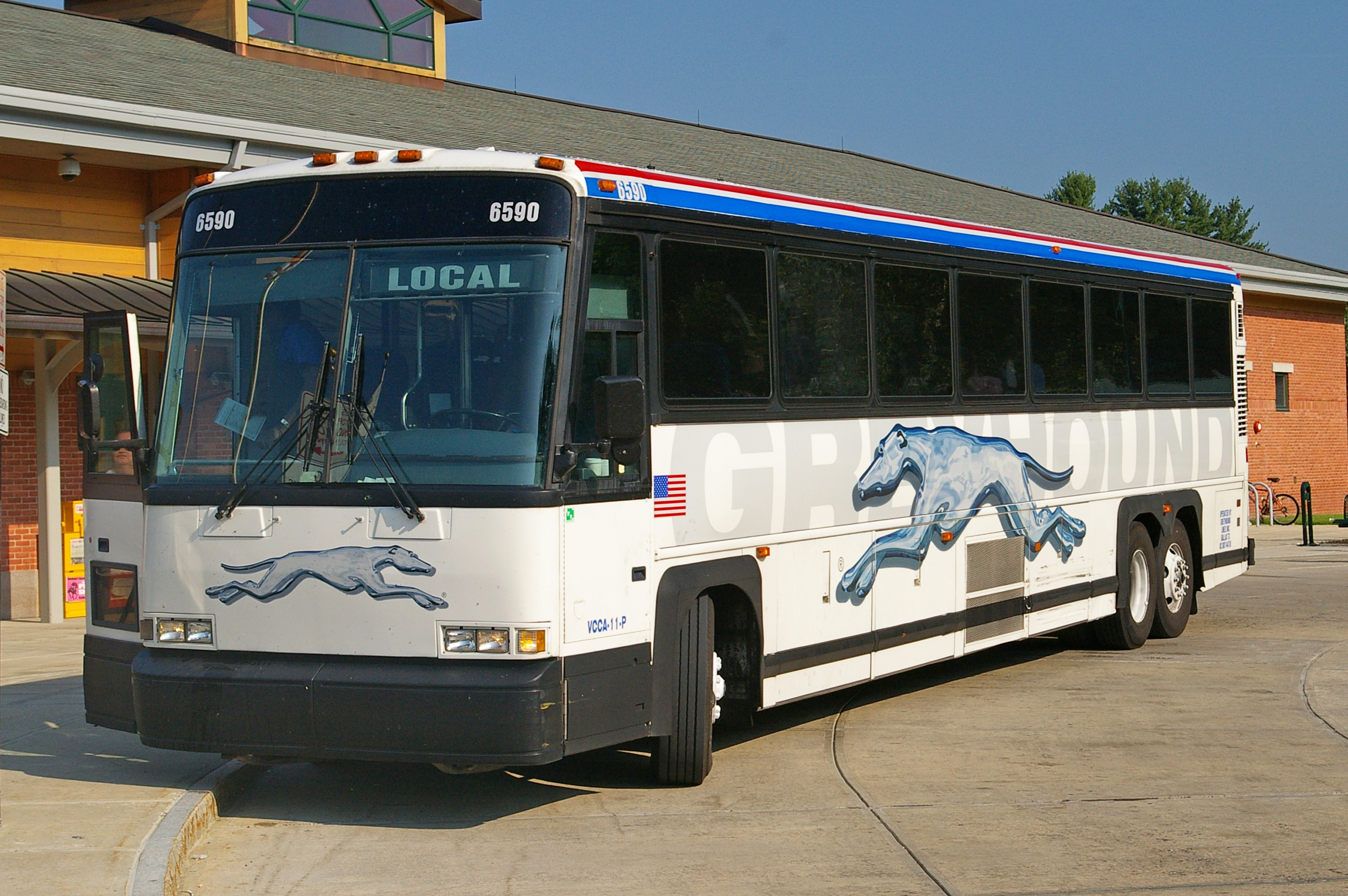
MCI 102DL3 operated by Greyhound Lines

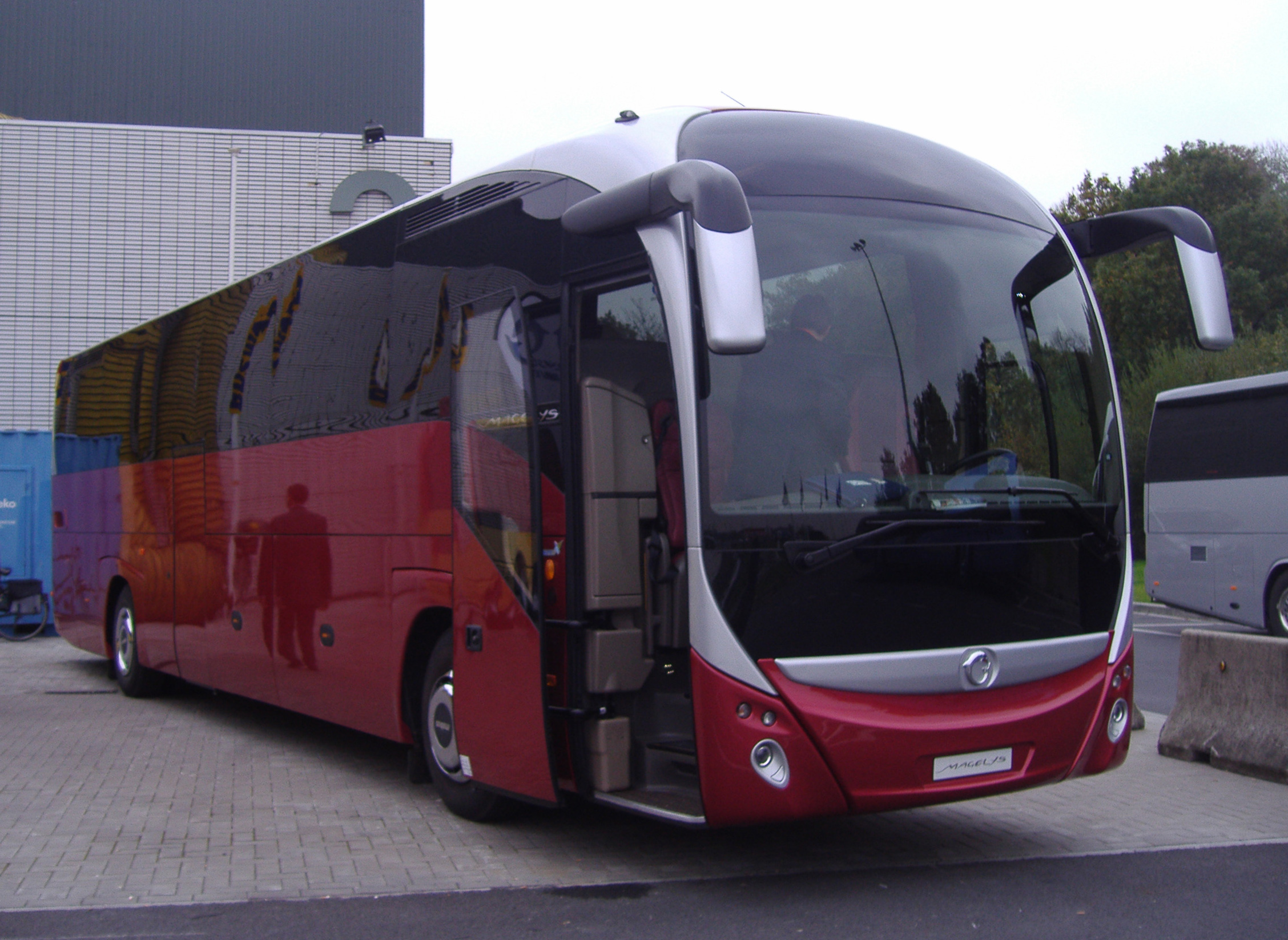
An Iveco Bus (Irisbus) Magelys at Busworld 2007

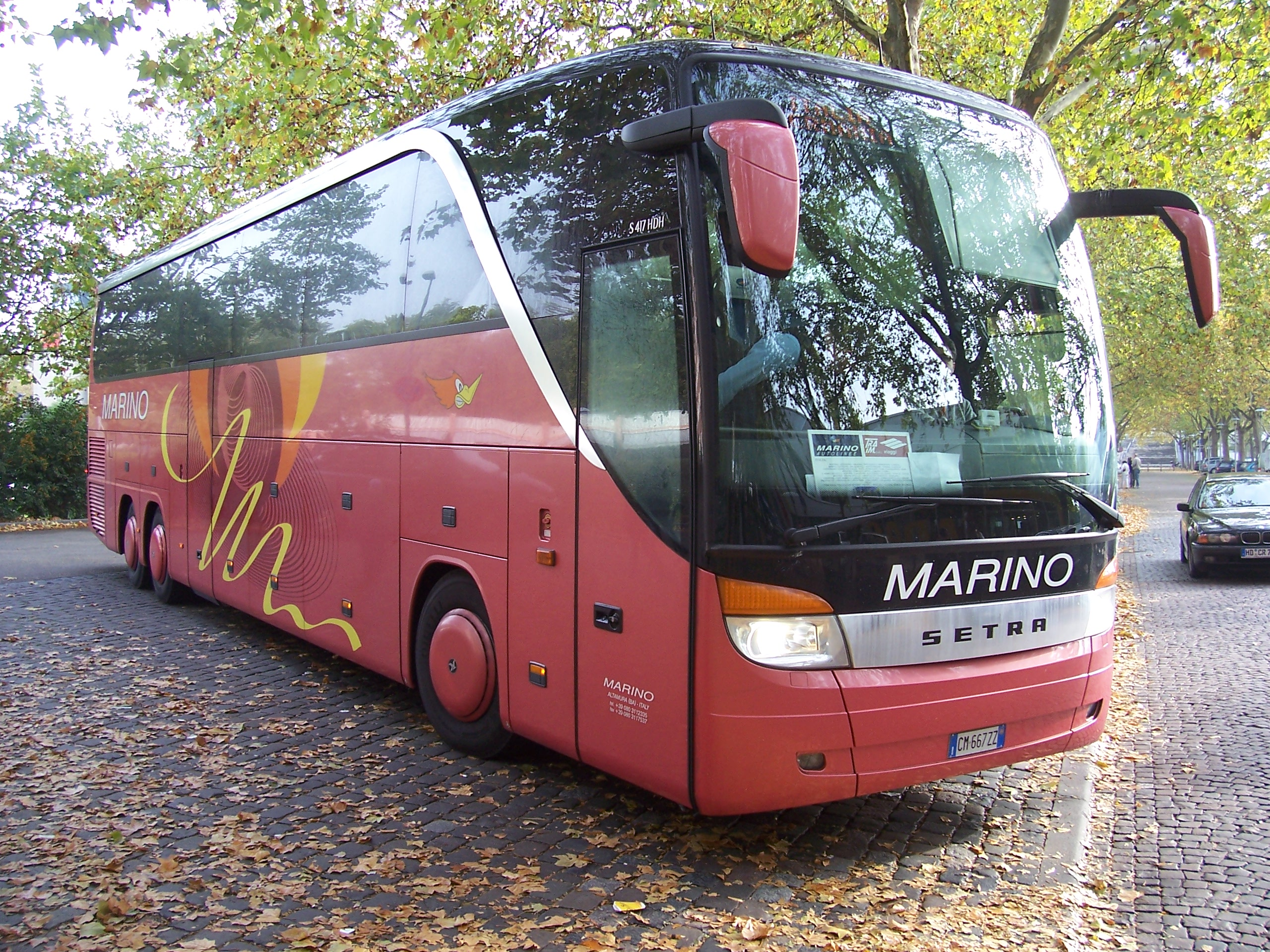
Setra S 417 HDH in Mannheim

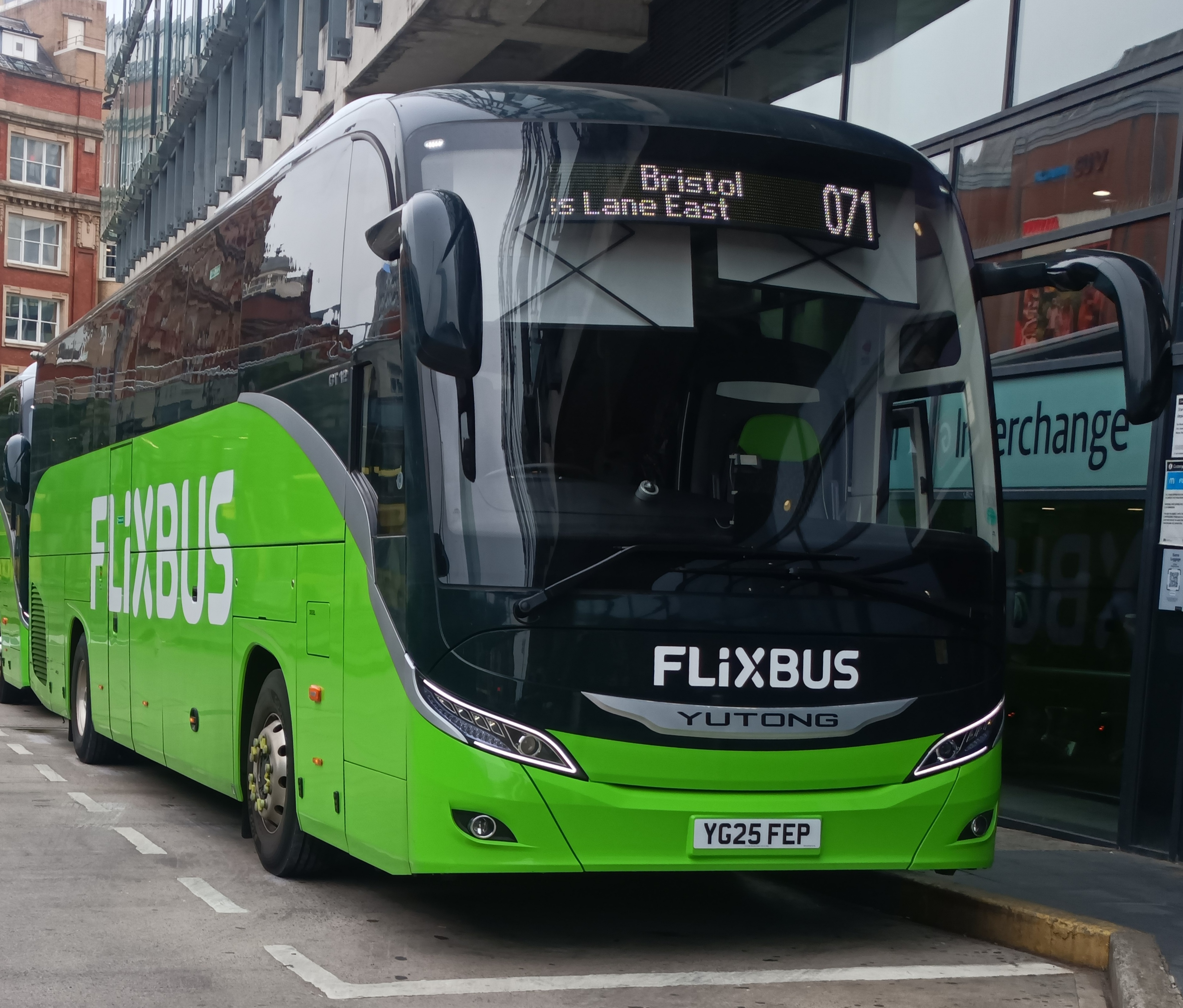
Yutong GT12 operated by FlixBus

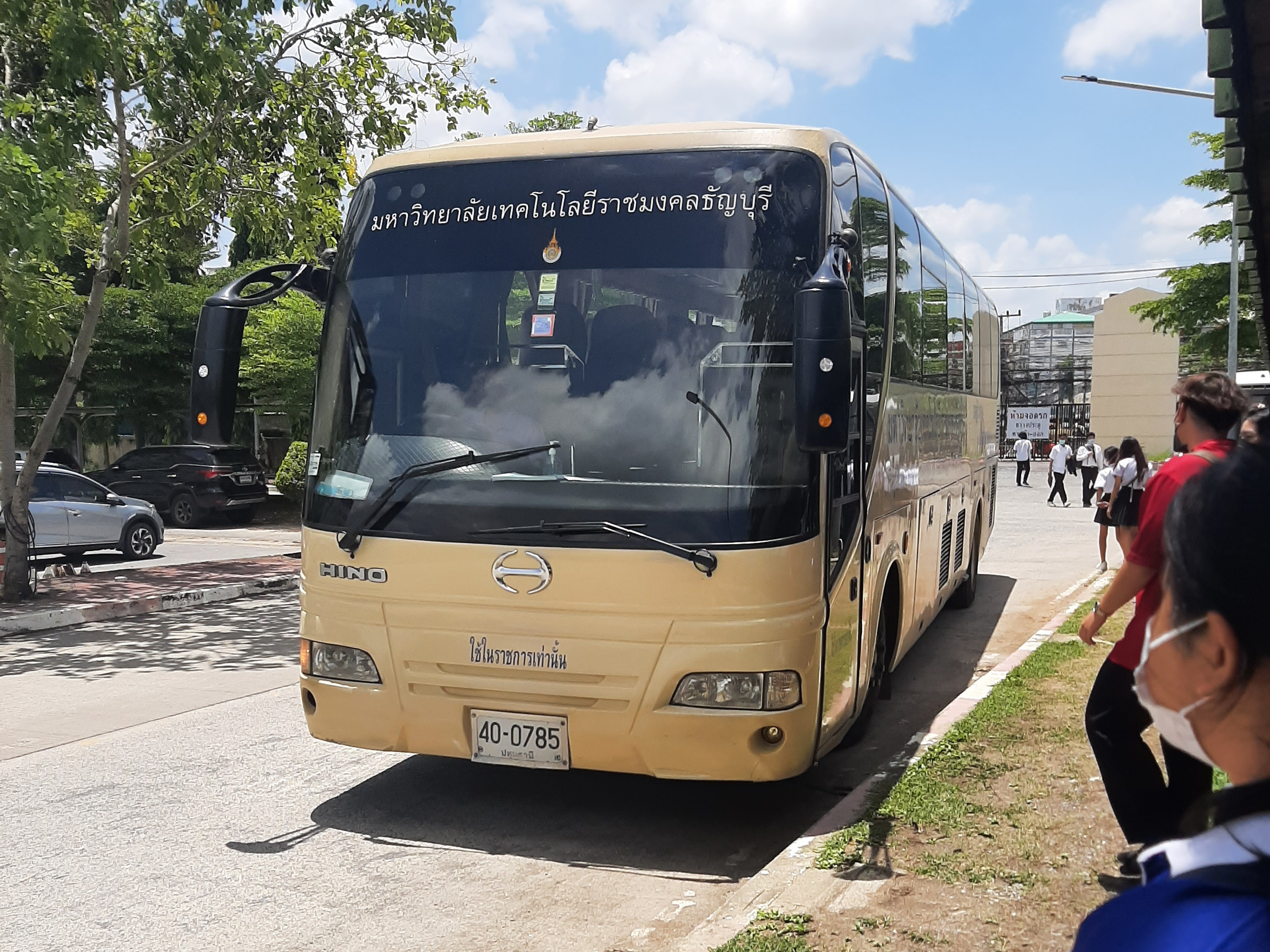
Hino Coach Bus in RMUTT (Pathumthani, Thailand)

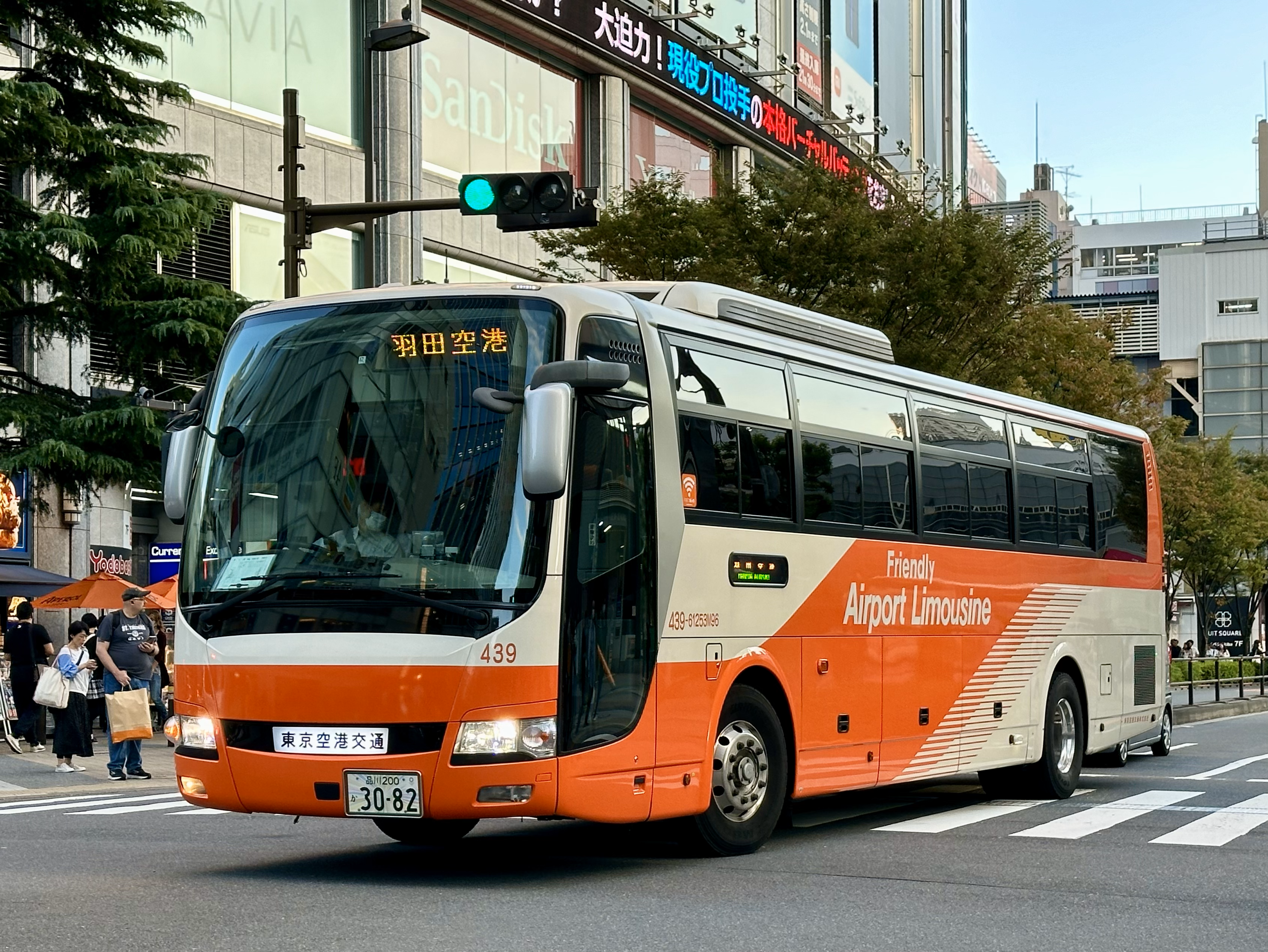
Mitsubishi Fuso Aero Ace used by Airport Limousine Bus in Tokyo, Japan

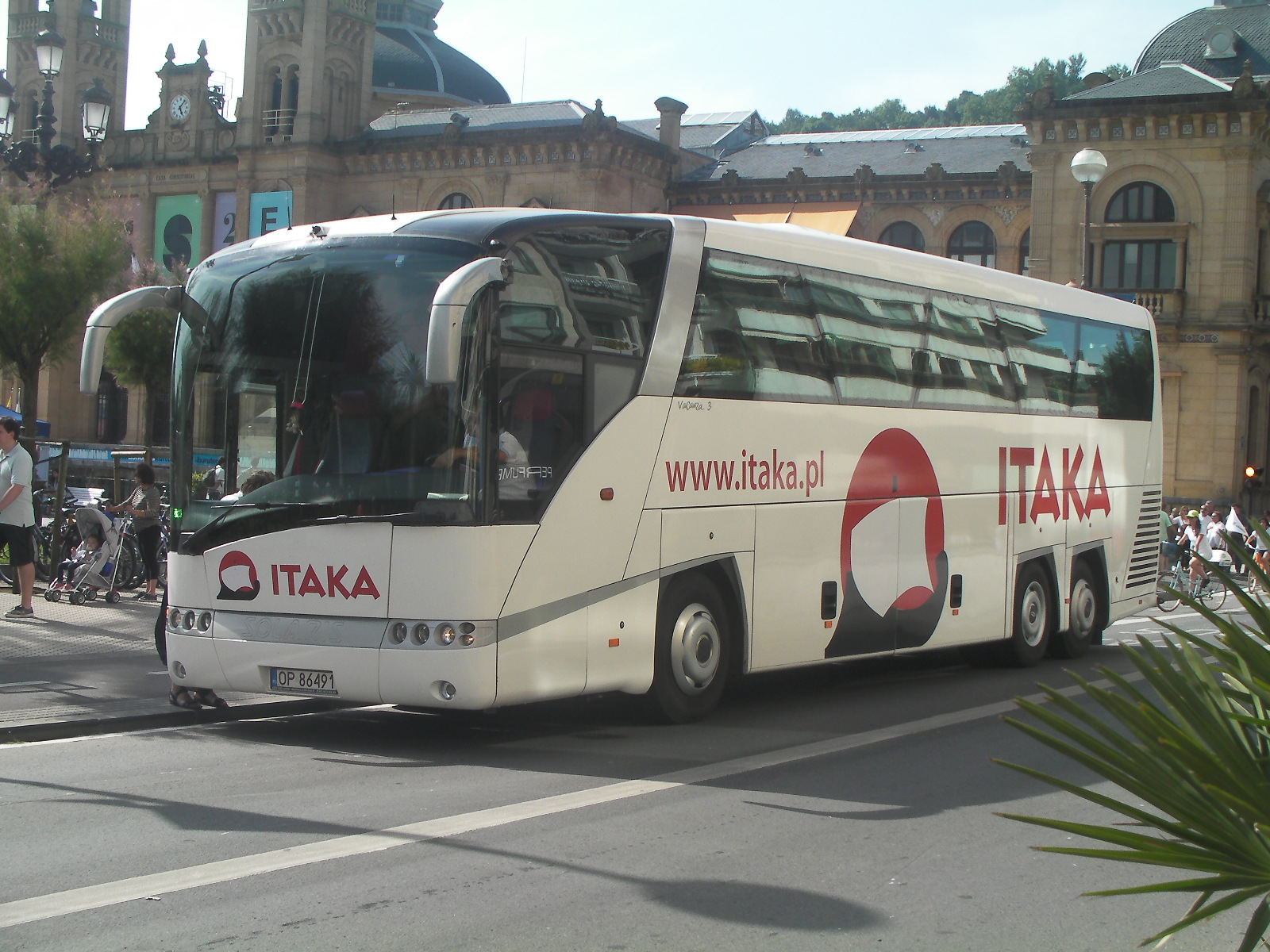
Solaris Vacanza 13, A 3-axle Solaris coach manufactured between 2001 and 2010 in San Sebastian, Spain

=== Vintage coaches ===
A selection of vehicles used in different parts of the world in the past.

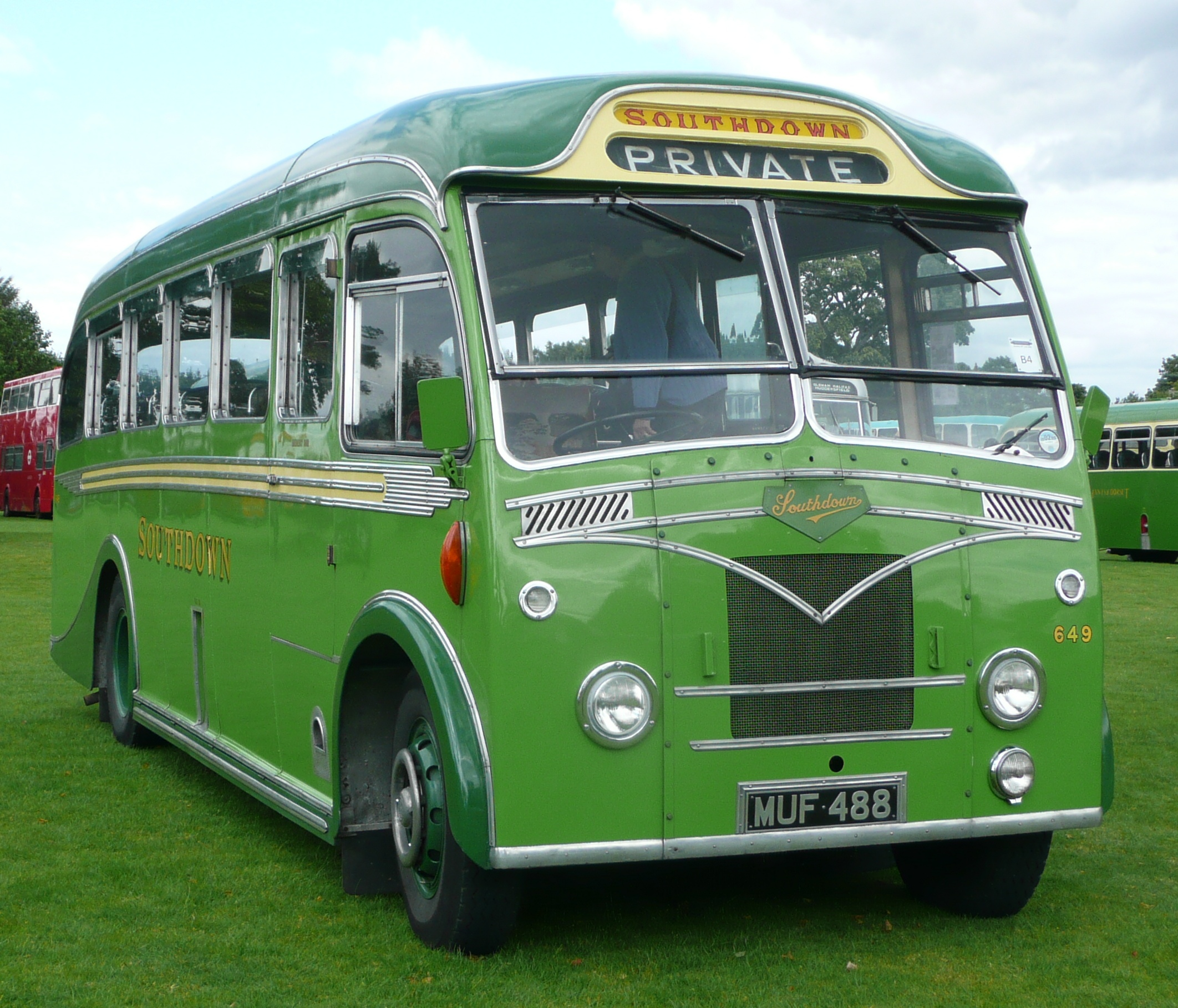
A Leyland Tiger used by Southdown Motor Services in England

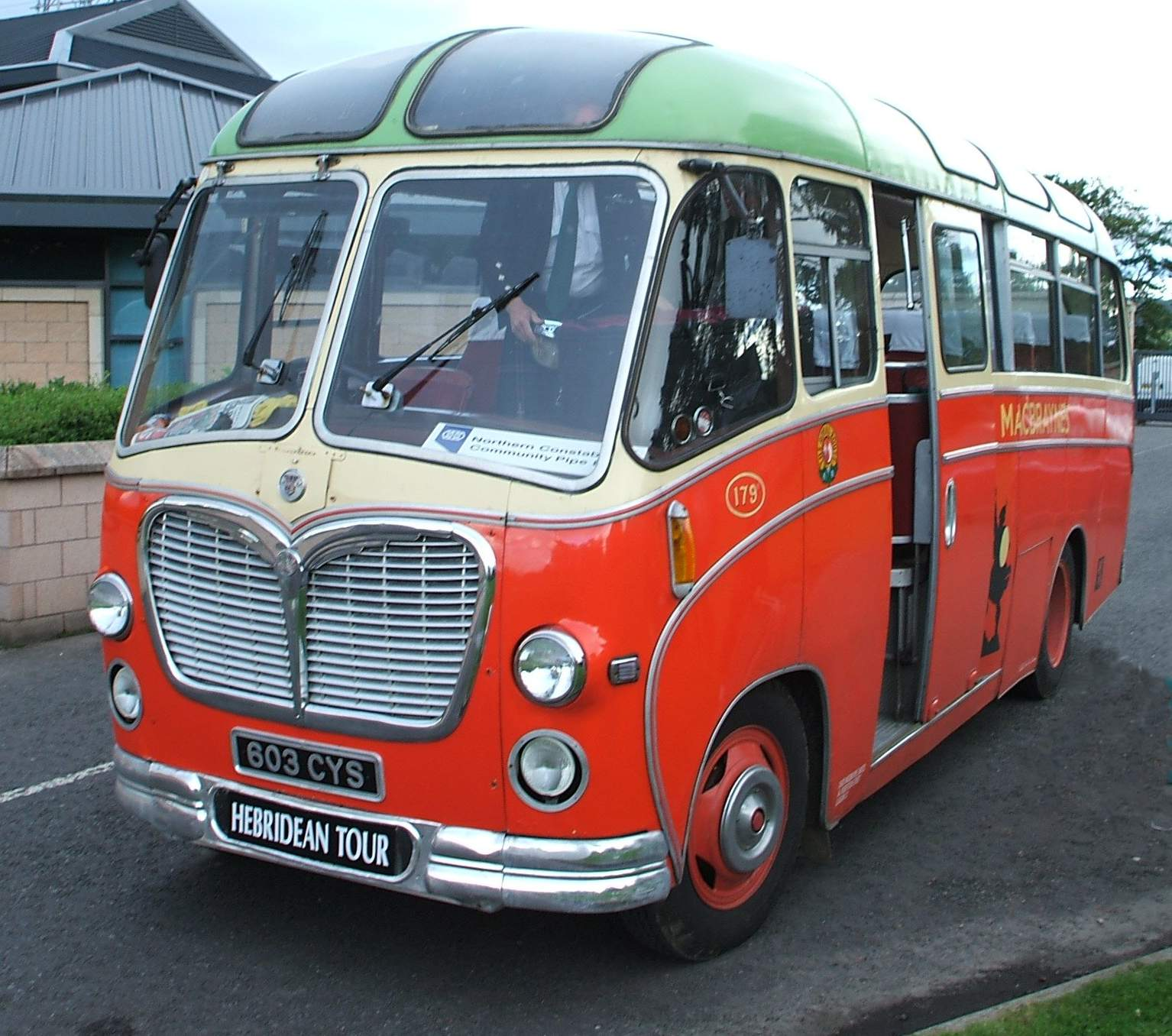
Bedford SB 1961 coach owned by MacBraynes Bus

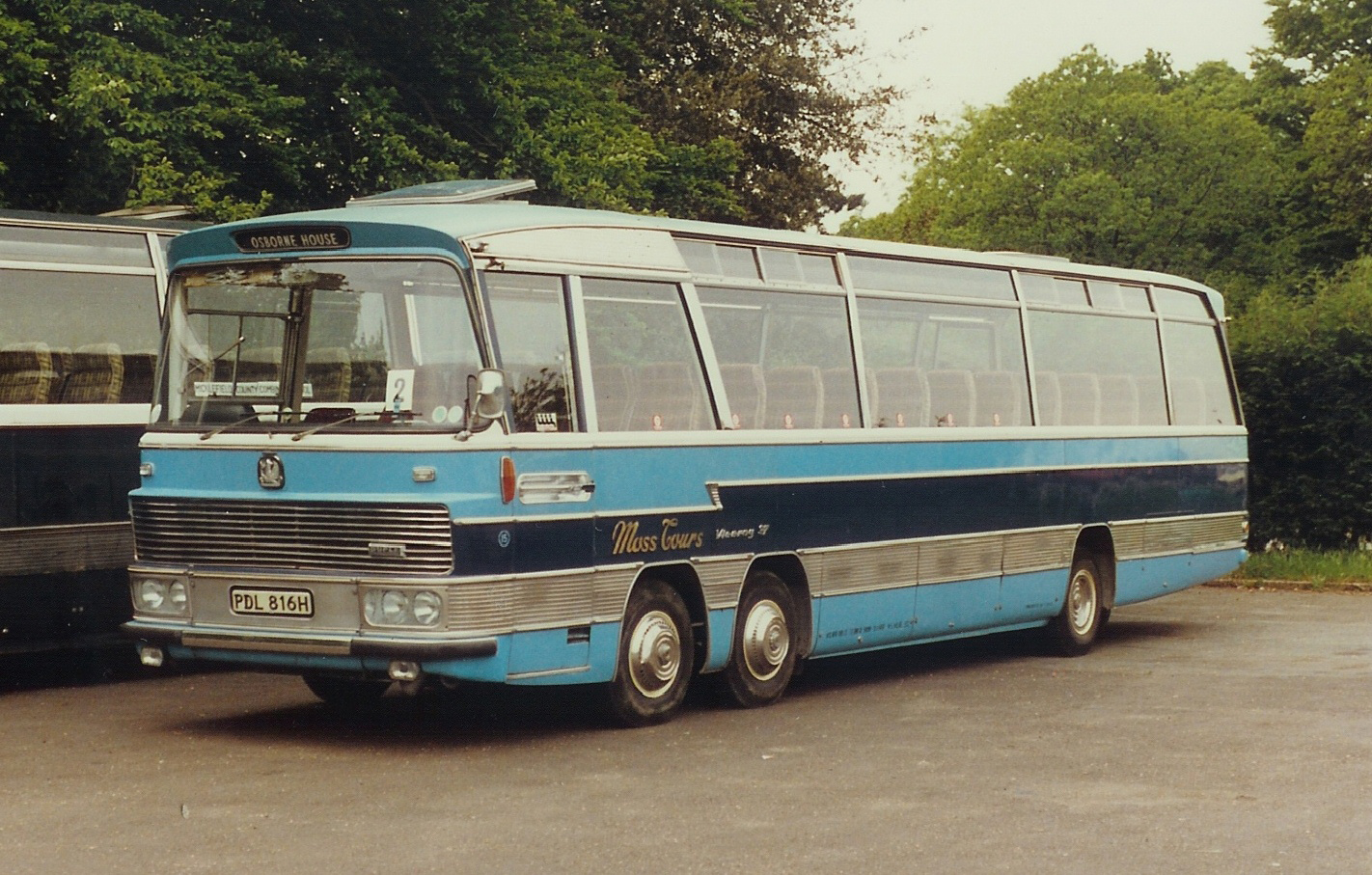
Bedford VAL

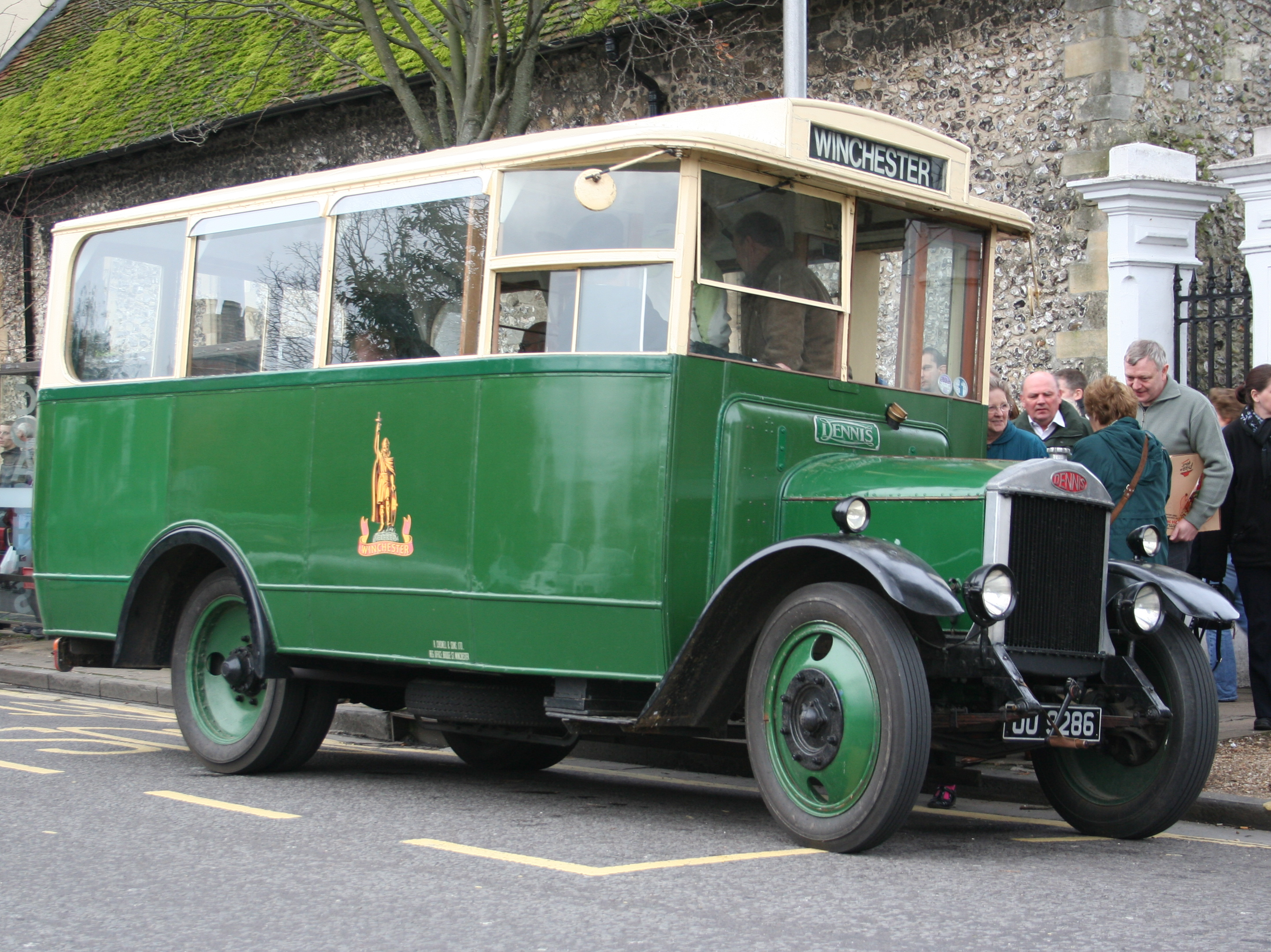
Short bodied Dennis 1931 King Alfred

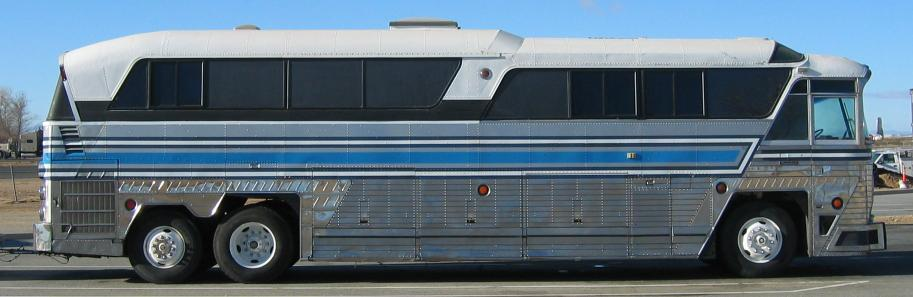
Motor Coach Industries MC 6 coach operated by Greyhound Lines

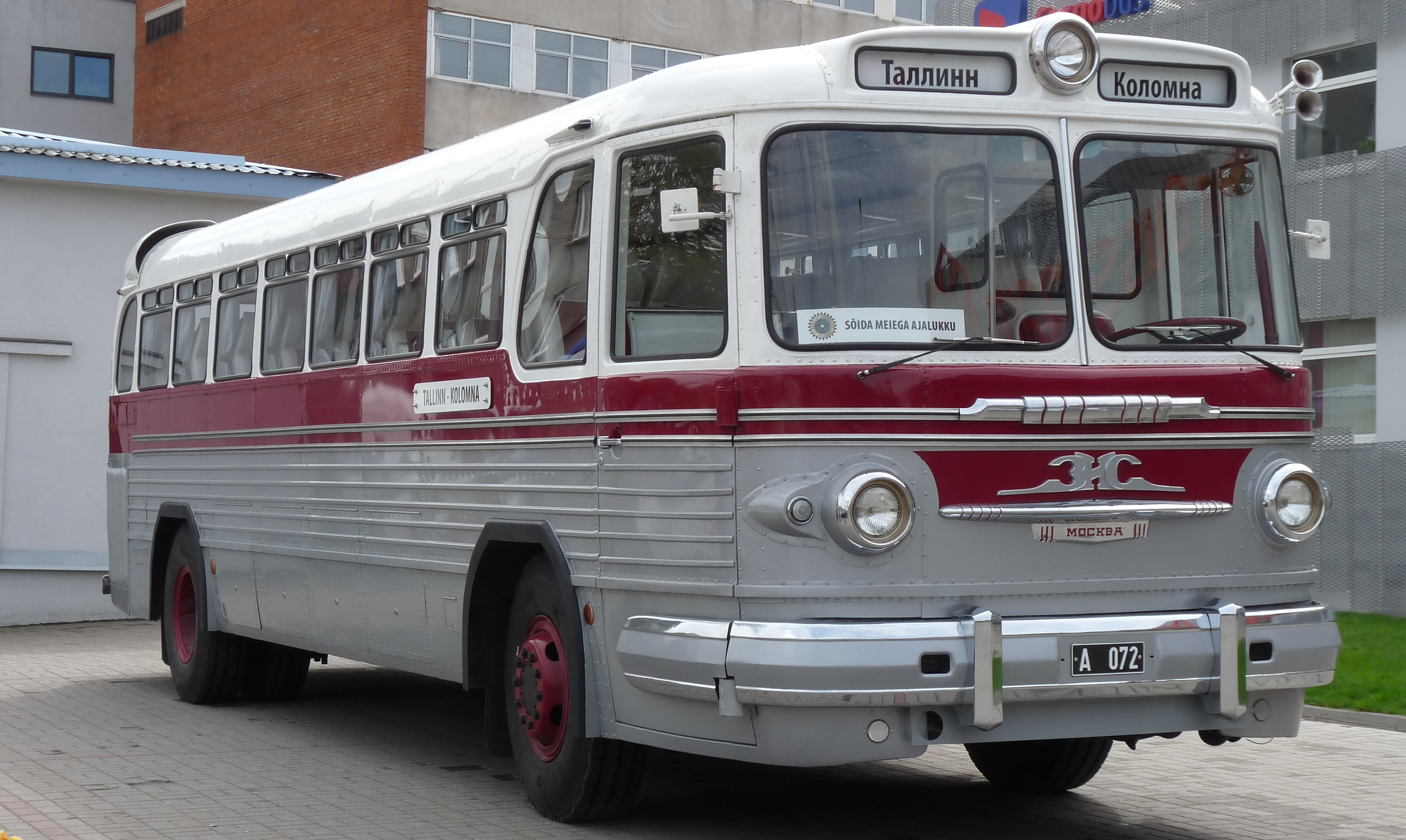
ZIS-127 in Tallinn

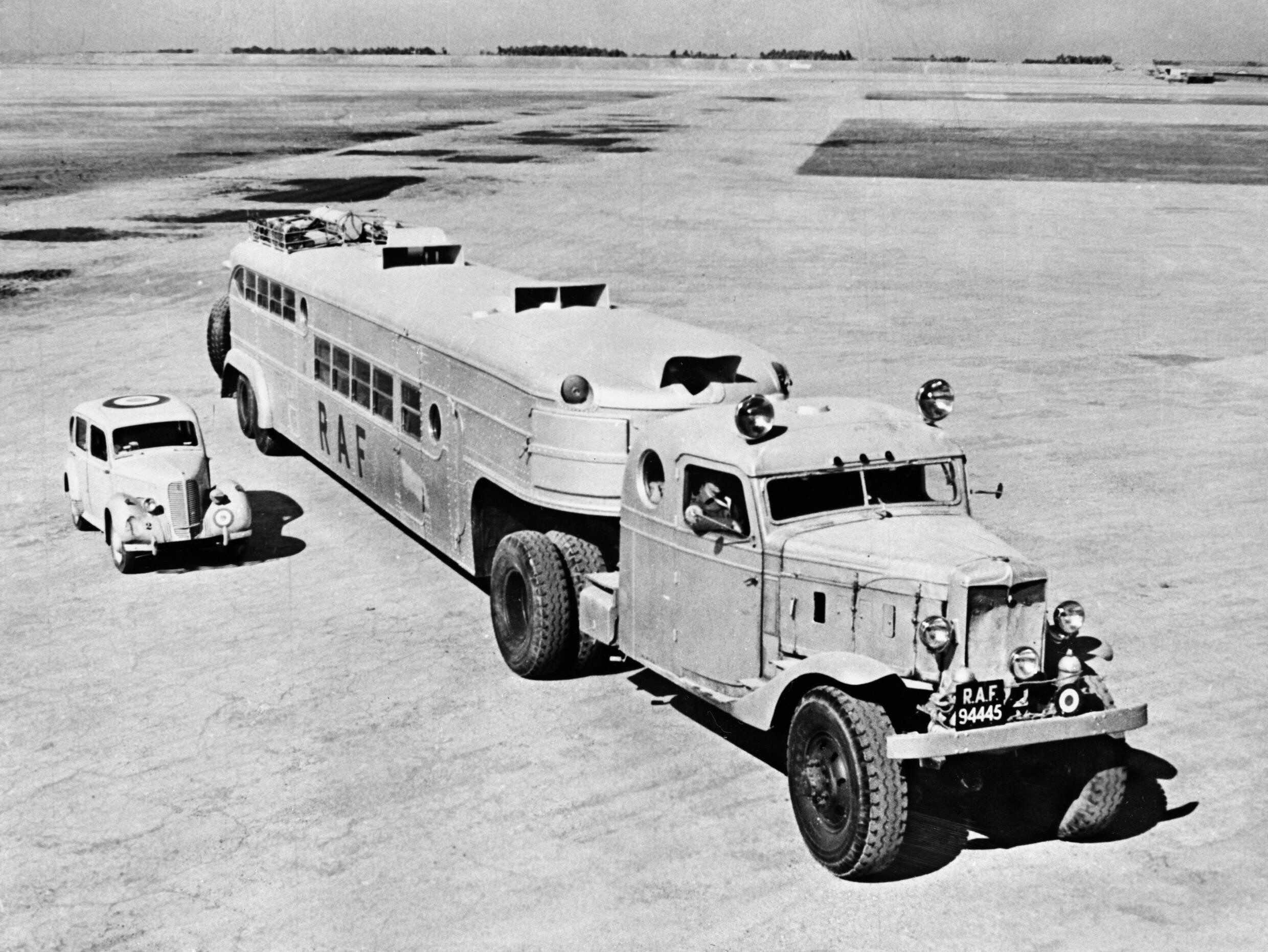
A Pullman bus of the Nairn Transport Company for the Damascus- Baghdad service across the desert in the 1940s

== See also ==
- Intercity bus driver
- Intercity bus service
- Carriage
- Charabanc
- Coach (carriage)
- Coach (rail)
- Coach transport in the United Kingdom
- Double-decker bus
- Family Motor Coach Association
- List of buses
- Motor bus
- Multi-axle bus
- Sleeper bus
- Side loader bus
- Transit bus
