= Solaris InterUrbino =

Polish intercity bus

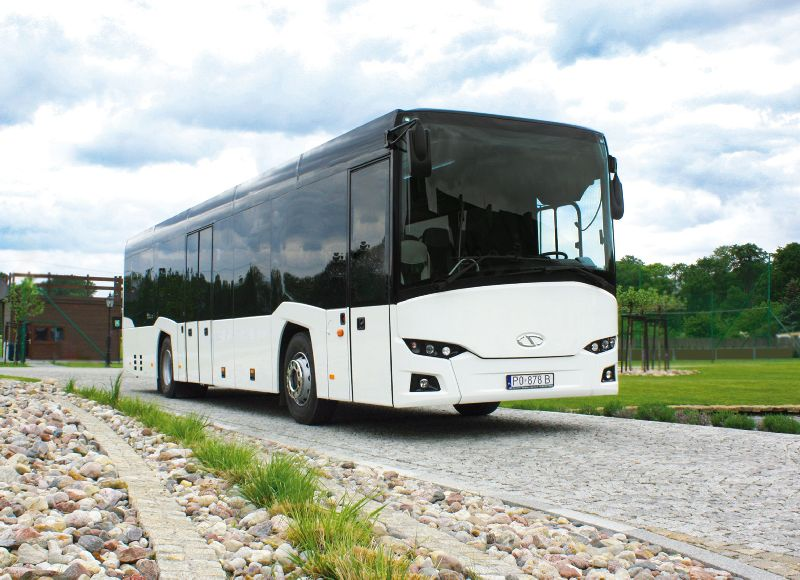

Overview
- Manufacturer: Solaris Bus & Coach
- Production: 2010–present
- Assembly: Bolechowo, Poland

Body and chassis
- Class: Single-decker intercity bus
- Doors: 2 doors
- Floor type: Step entrance

Powertrain
- Engine: 1) Iveco N60 ENT 220 EEV; 2) Cummins ISB6,7E5 300; 3) Cummins ISB6,7EEV 300; 4) DAF PR265 U1 (Euro 5); 5) DAF PR265 U2 (EEV); 6) DAF MX 11 240 (Euro 6)
- Capacity: 55 seated
- Transmission: Eaton FSO 8406; ZF 6S1010BO; Allison Torqmatic; ZF EcoLife 6AP 1700B; Voith DIWA 5

Dimensions
- Length: 12 m (39 ft 4 in)
- Width: 2.55 m (8 ft 4 in)
- Height: 3.1 m (10 ft 2 in); 3.3 m (10 ft 10 in) (with air conditioning)
- Curb weight: 18,000 kg (40,000 lb)

Chronology
- Predecessor: Solaris Vacanza

The Solaris InterUrbino is a single-decker intercity bus produced by Solaris Bus & Coach since 2010, replacing the Solaris Vacanza.

== History ==
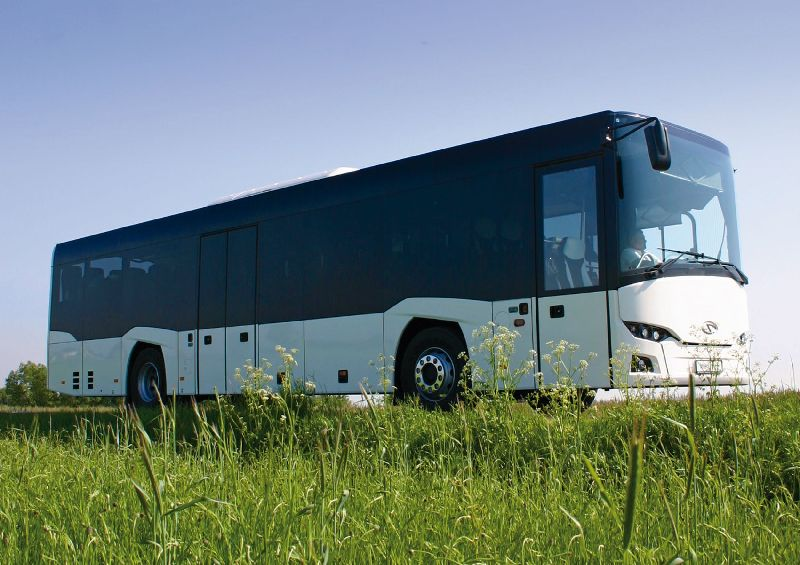
Solaris InterUrbino 12

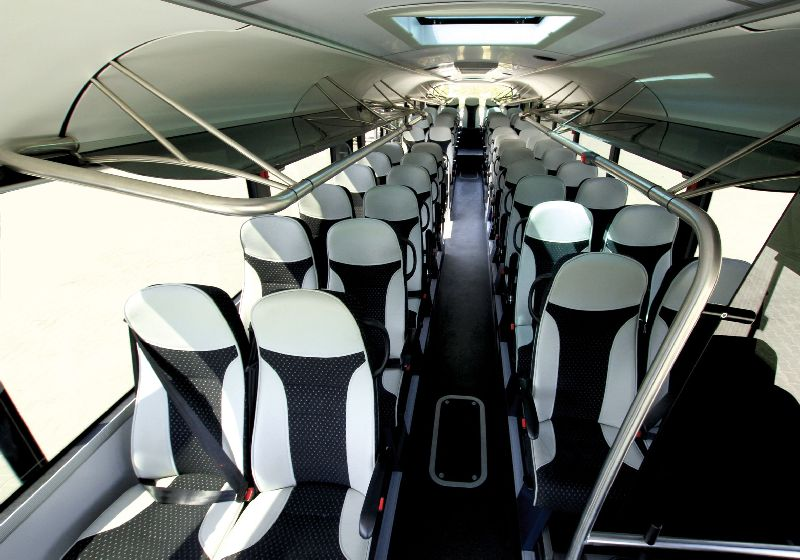
Solaris InterUrbino 12 – Interior

The official Polish premier of the model InterUrbino 12 occurred on the 16 September 2009 on the Transexpo Trade Fair in Kielce. Whereas the European premier happened in October of the same year on the Busworld Kortrijk Trade Fair in Belgium. The vehicle was already on the road in Bydgoszcz and Gliwice, where various driving tests occurred, the photograph shoots had been in Olsztyn.

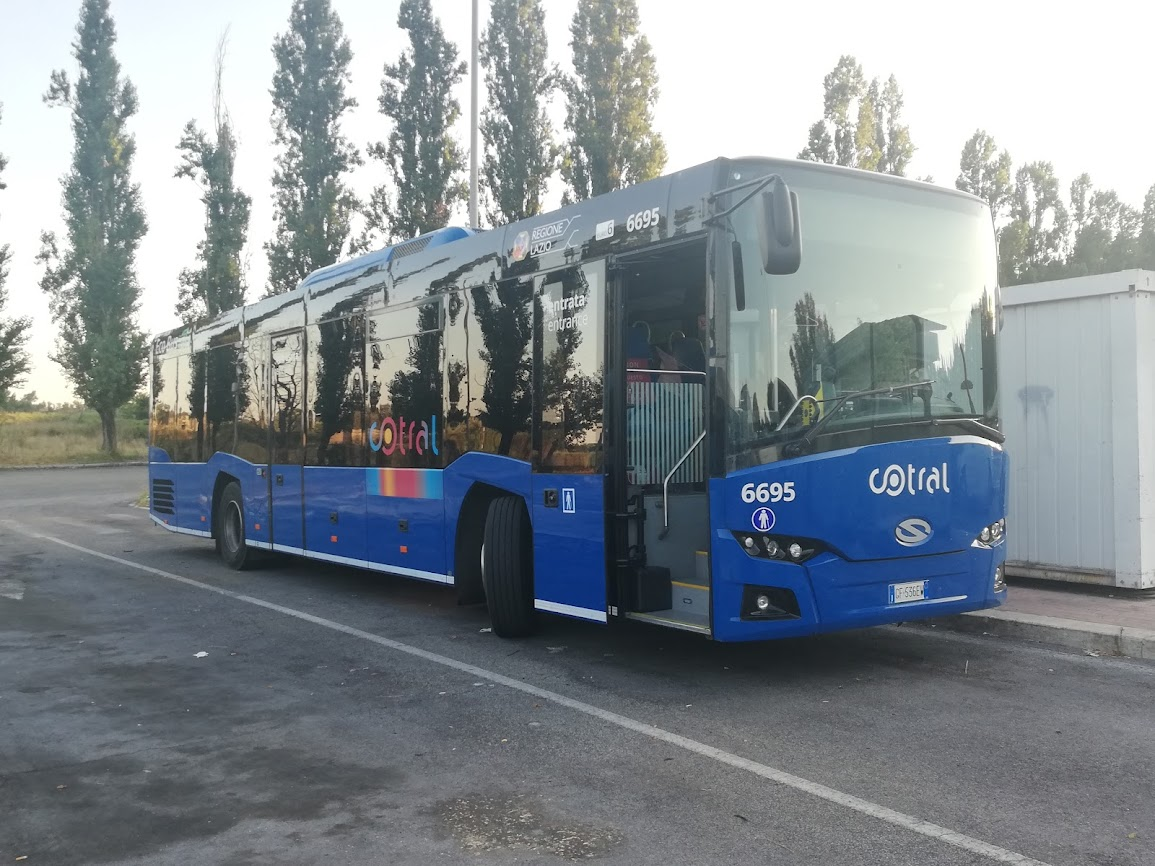
Solaris InterUrbino 12 2nd generation operated by Cotral S.P.A in Italy

In 2009, the first two prototypes. In the first half of 2010, there were meant to be 10 prototypes, which would have undergone extensive tests and crash exploitation tests (the amount of them built is not known). The series production began in the second half of the year. The production line is able to produce 450 buses per year, 70 of them would stay in Poland.

The prototypes undergone extensive tests on the Tatra test track in Kopřivnice and on the test track of the Wabco company in Rovaniemi in Finland in the Arctic Circle. The tests included driving in extreme atmosphere, with temperatures dropping to -30˚C. The buses had undergone various durability tests including the elk drive, rough and harsh turns and taking the vehicle on turning extremes, with and without using the route stabilisation ESC, also checking the bus' reaction to sharp turns.

In 2010, the first twenty produced buses were delivered to France.

There are future variations of the InterUrbino where the bus is longer, with the length of 15 metres, with three wheel axis. In June 2012, the second model of the series debuted, the two wheel axis Solaris InterUrbino 12,8. After this the whole series had a new interior design makeover, with a bow type design by the Berlin designers StudioFT. The Cummins engine is fitted with the OBD2 system.

The electrical installation is fitted with LED lighting. This covers the integrated lighting in the daytime, anti-fog lights, integrated baggage shelves, indicators, lights and interior lights.

Together with the modernisation a new option is offered, with the classic design option, with the interior passenger premium design. This includes the lighting on the ceiling, integrated baggage shelves and an individual instrumental panel with a ventilation system by each chair.
