= Solaris Vacanza =

Polish tourist coach

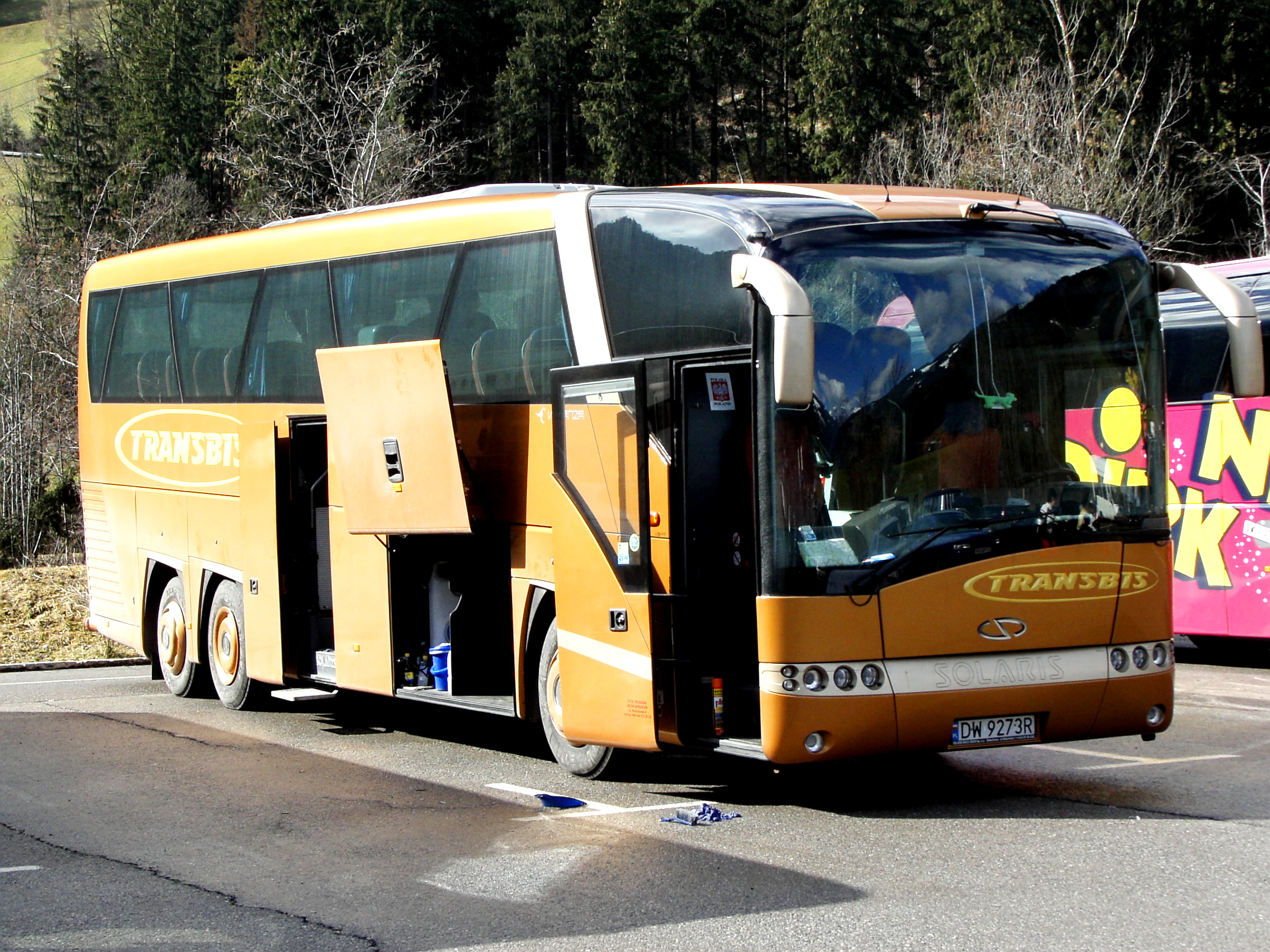
- Solaris Vacanza 13

Overview
- Manufacturer: Solaris Bus & Coach
- Production: 2001–2010
- Assembly: Bolechowo, Poland

Body and chassis
- Class: Coach
- Doors: 2

Powertrain
- Engine: DAF XE 315C Euro 3 DAF MX 300 Euro 4
- Capacity: 46 to 51 (Vacanza 12); 55 (Vacanza 13)
- Power output: 315 kW (428 HP); 300 kW (408 HP)
- Transmission: ZF 8S180

Dimensions
- Length: 12000 mm (Vacanza 12); 12900 mm (Vacanza 13)
- Width: 2550 mm
- Height: 3830 mm (Vacanza 12); 3860 mm (Vacanza 13)
- Curb weight: 18000 kg

Chronology
- Successor: Solaris InterUrbino

Solaris Vacanza is a tourist coach that was produced between 2001 and 2010 by Solaris Bus & Coach. Two models were offered - the two-axle Solaris Vacanza 12 and the three-axle Solaris Vacanza 13. The Vacanza was replaced in 2010 by the Solaris InterUrbino.

== History ==
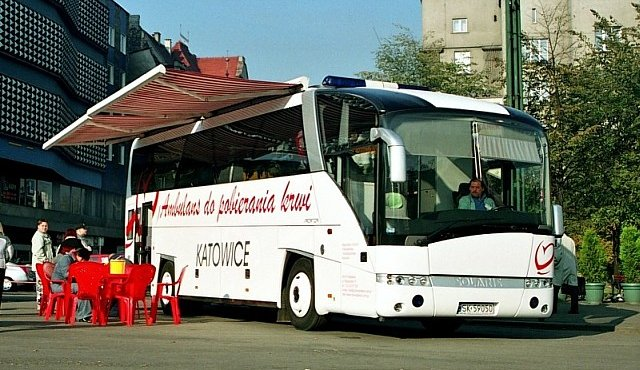
Solaris Vacanza 12

The Solaris Vacanza 12 debuted at the Busworld Kortrijk Trade Fair in Belgium in October 2001, and at the Polish premiere during the Fair Tour Salon in Poznań (2001). Technical research prototypes were carried out on the DAF track in the Netherlands, the Wabco track and at the Tatra track in Bednary. It entered series production in spring 2002. The Vacanza 13 had its world premiere at the Busworld Kortrijk Trade Fair in 2003. The first presentation took place in Poland in Służewiec in Warsaw in autumn of 2003. Production began in 2004. It coincided with the introduction of the second generation of the Vacanza 12. The whole family was styled by the IFS Designatelier Studio in Berlin. The brand symbol of the series of the bus is a kangaroo.

The bus uses the DAF XE 315C engine (Euro III) and ZF 8S180. Since 2006, the coach uses the DAF MX 300 engine which meets the standard of the Euro 4. The body is made of stainless steel and laminate panels which are reinforced with fibreglass.

=== Bloodmobiles ===
On the basis of first-generation Solaris Vacanza 12 in 2002 there was built a bloodmobile (known as a Vampirebus) for the Regional Blood Centre in Katowice. A coach from the second generation of this model in 2004 was built for the Regional Blood Centre in Bydgoszcz, and in 2007 for RCKiK in Poznań. The coach is equipped with a small doctor's office with workplace for the doctor, laboratory, a part to register the donors and 4 or 5 positions for the collection of blood and a small kitchenette. To ensure a steady supply of electricity there has been an additional generator installed for the electricity supply.

A pair of Vacanza 13 bloodmobiles were built for the Regional Blood Centre in Warsaw. In 2007 the company sold one Vacanza 13 for RCKiK in Katowice, and in 2008 for RCKiK in Gdańsk and Katowice. In 2009, another Vacanza 13 bloodmobile was purchased by RCKiK in Raciborz.
