= ExpressBus =

Finnish bus network

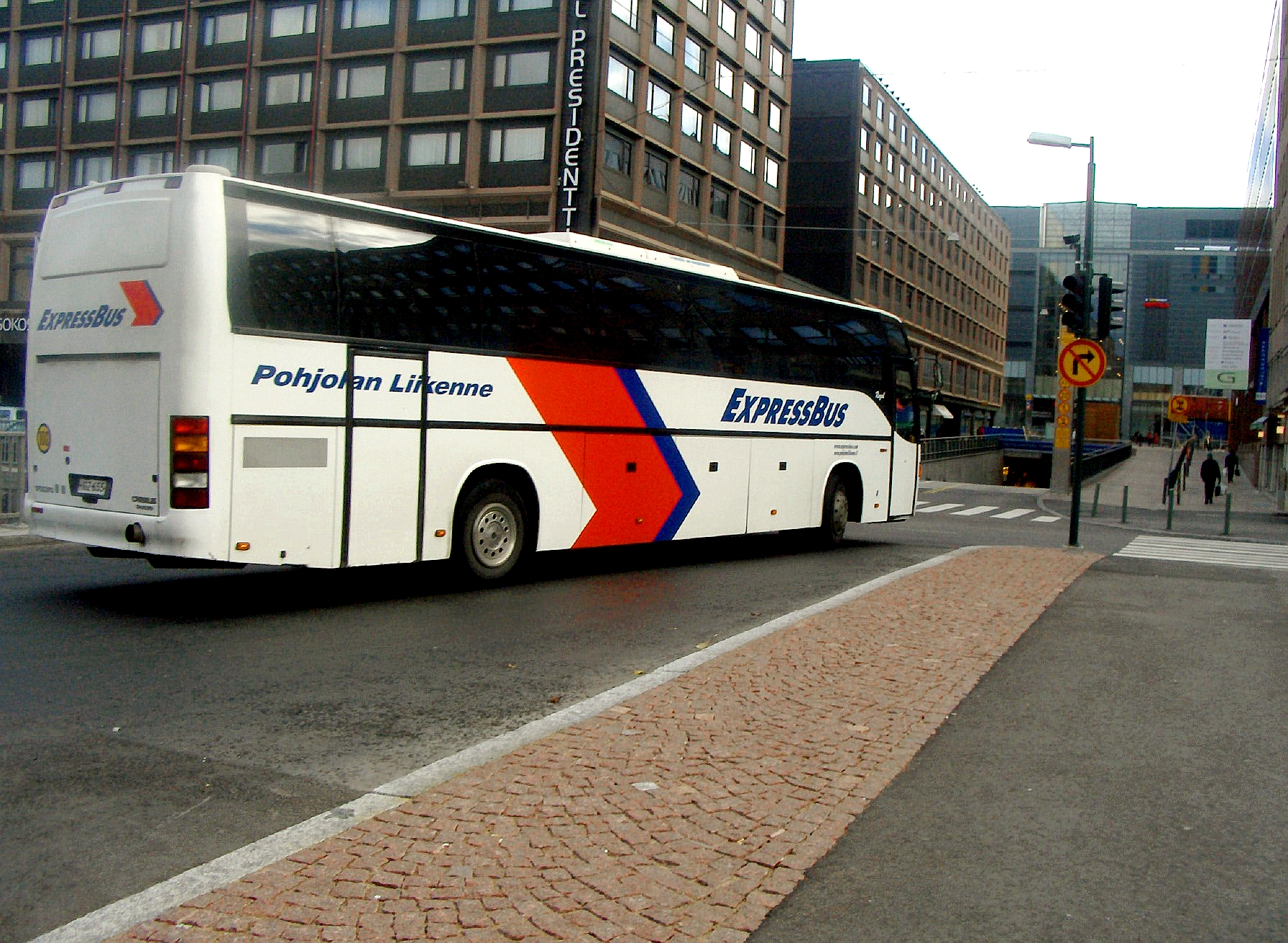
- Carrus Star bodied Volvo B10MA ExpressBus coach in Helsinki
- Founded: 1991; 35 years ago
- Service area: Finland
- Website: www.expressbus.fi

ExpressBus (abbreviated as EB) is a Finnish express coach network covering most of Finland. It was originally a joint marketing brand of three coach operators, modeled after Norwegian NOR-WAY Bussekspress system, and it was launched in 1991, when passenger numbers were on the decline. The fleet has around 100 coaches with a white base colour and a red-blue arrow. The current ExpressBus operator is Pekolan Liikenne. Many of the departures also carry Matkahuolto bus cargo in addition to passengers.
