= Karosa ŠL 11 =

Czech intercity bus

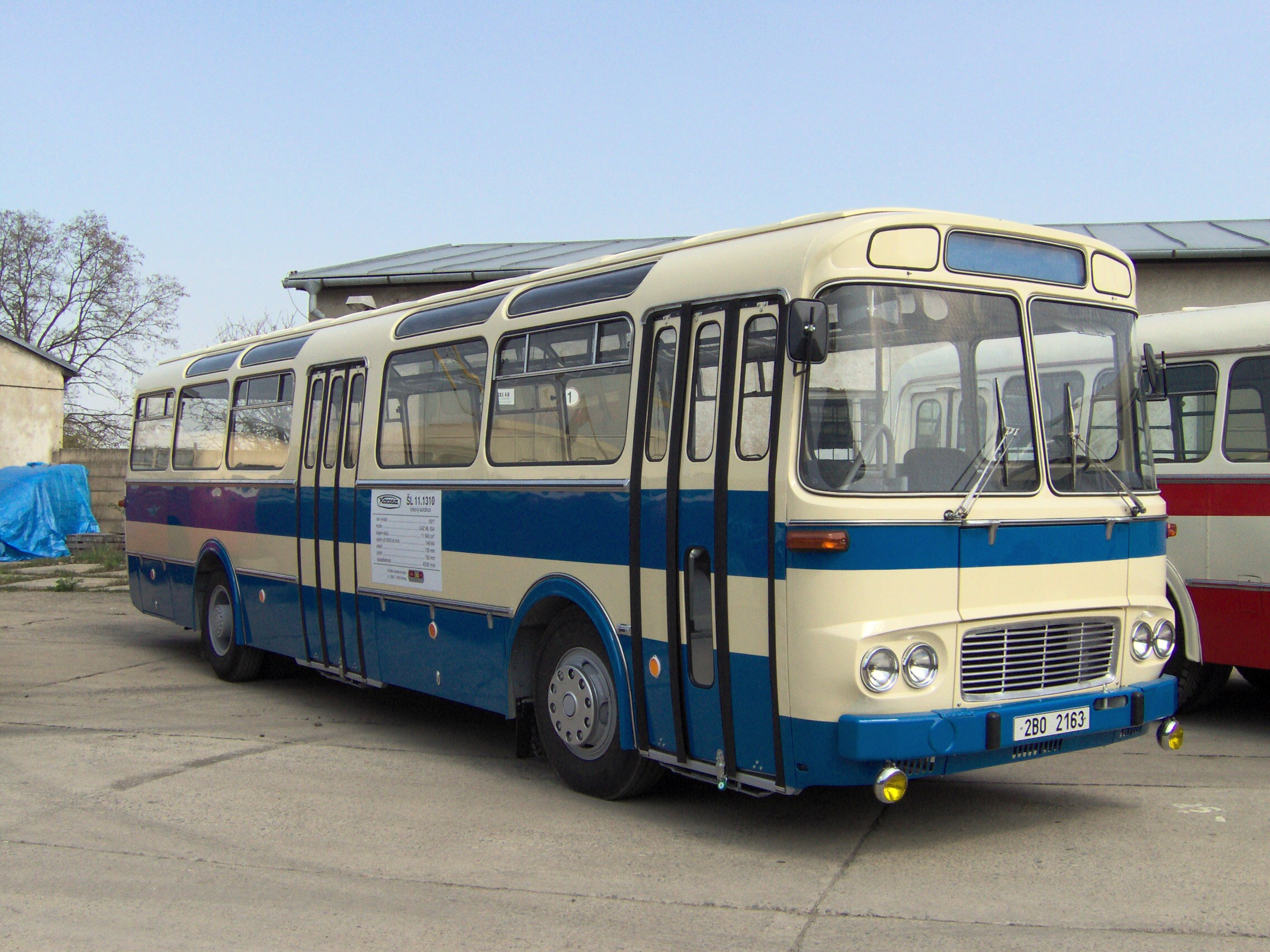
- Historical Karosa ŠL 11 in Brno, Czech Republic

Overview
- Manufacturer: Karosa

Body and chassis
- Doors: 2, air-operated
- Floor type: High-floor
- Chassis: semi-self-supporting with frame

Powertrain
- Engine: Škoda ML634 V6 Diesel engine
- Power output: 154,4 kW (Škoda ML 634)
- Transmission: Praga 5-speed manual

Dimensions
- Length: 10985/11135 mm
- Width: 2500 mm
- Height: 2985 mm
- Curb weight: 8370 kg

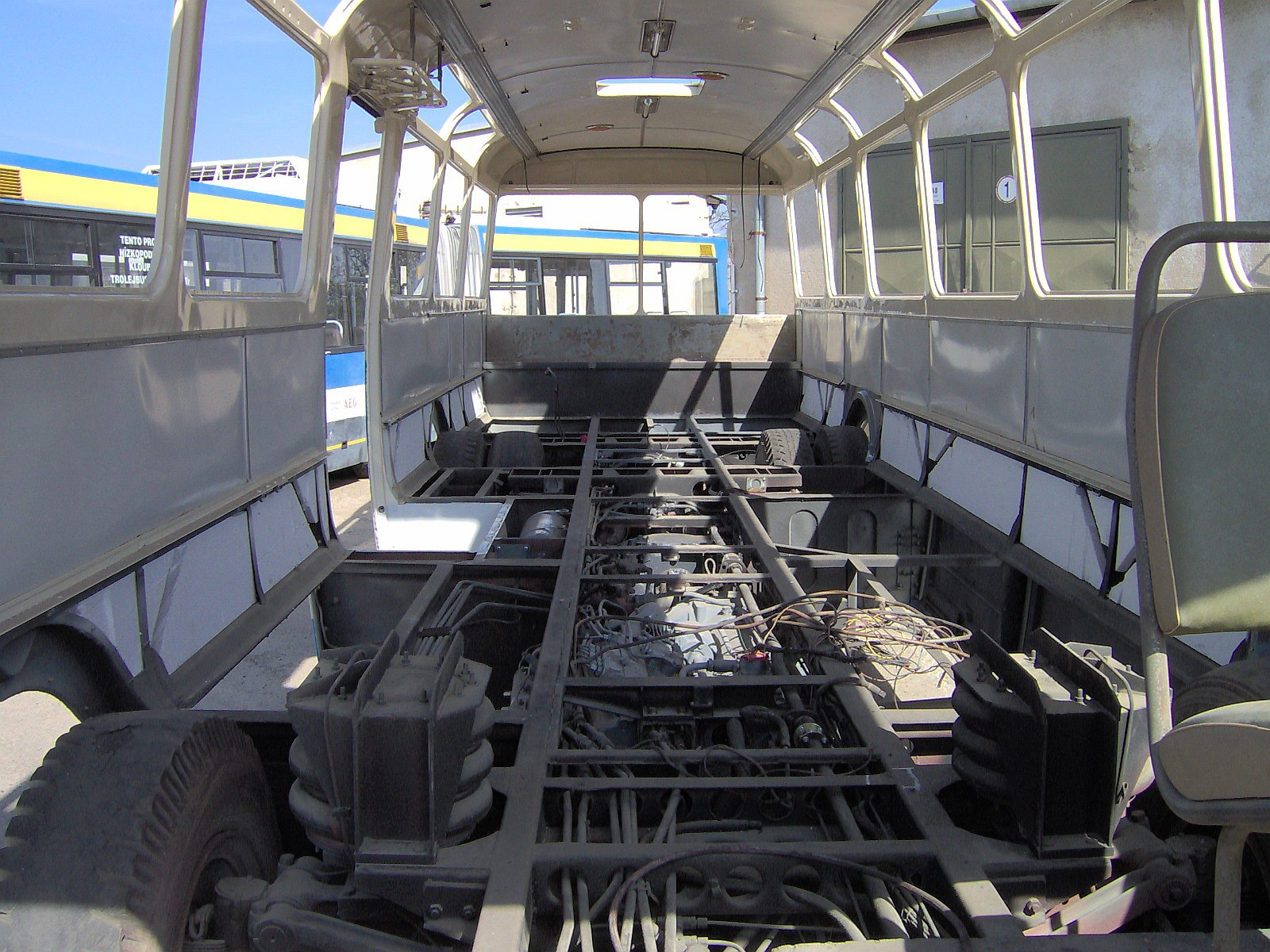
Frame of Karosa ŠL 11 during reconstruction

Karosa ŠL 11 is an intercity bus produced from 1970 to 1981 by bus manufacturer Karosa from the Czechoslovakia. It was succeeded by Karosa C 734 in 1981.

== Construction features ==
Karosa ŠL 11 is completely different from its predecessor, Škoda 706 RTO-CAR, which had engine in front and two doors. ŠL 11 is a model of Karosa Š series. It is derived from Karosa ŠM 11 city bus, and also unified with long-distance coach Karosa ŠD 11. Body is semi-self-supporting with frame and engine with manual gearbox in the middle, between the wheels. Only rear axle is propulsed. Front axle is independent, rear axle is solid. All axles are mounted on air suspension. On the right side are two folding doors (first are narrower than middle doors). Inside are used leatherette seats. Driver's cab is not separated from the rest of the vehicle.

== Production and operation ==
Serial production started in 1970 and continued until 1981.

ŠL 11 are not operated in public transport anymore, but many of them are operated as historical vehicles.

== Historical vehicles ==
- Technical Muzeum Brno

== See also ==
- List of buses
