= Karosa Š series =

Series of Czechoslovak/Czech buses

Karosa Š series is a collective term for several variants of a Czechoslovak bus produced by Karosa in Vysoké Mýto from 1964 (with prototypes dating back to 1961) until 1981.

== History ==
The Š series buses were developed as a successor to the Škoda 706 RTO, which was produced in three (or four) variants starting in 1958. A government resolution from the late 1950s led Karosa to begin developing an entirely new high-capacity bus that, due to other governmental requirements, could no longer be a modernization of the 706 RTO; instead, the company had to create a completely new design (Berliet PH copied). This concept resulted in a semi-self-supporting body, which Karosa continued using even after the end of Š series production (the letter Š denotes the engine manufacturer, LIAZ). The first, narrower doors were placed ahead of the front overhang, and all other doors were wide enough to accommodate two streams of passengers. Another key requirement was good manoeuvrability, which was achieved by a short wheelbase and a split front axle. The engine and other components were installed under the floor in the centre of the vehicle, and the rear axle was powered (rear B axle in the Karosa ŠM 16,5).

The very first Š series bus, the ŠM 11, was built in 1961 and, unlike its successors, was equipped with many parts sourced from Western Europe. In the following years, additional prototypes left Karosa’s factory. After the test series of the ŠM 11 was completed, serial production began in 1964. Production ended in 1981, and a total of 26 669 of these buses were built, approximately one-fifth of which were intended for export. The last Š series bus in regular service in the Czech Republic operated until 1994 in Opava and Plzeň. Many Š series vehicles have been preserved as historical exhibits.

The Š series buses were intended to be unified with the Škoda T 11 trolleybus (the first Czechoslovak attempt to standardize buses with trolleybuses). The body parts for the T 11 (almost identical to those of the ŠM 11) were to be produced at Karosa, with electrical equipment supplied by Škoda. However, due to the general decline of trolleybus transport in the 1960s, development of the trolleybus was halted after only eight T 11 trolleybuses were built.

In 1981, the Š series was succeeded by the 700 series.

== Variants ==
- Karosa ŠM 11 – a standard three-door city bus.
- Karosa ŠL 11 – a two-door intercity bus designed for ČSAD.
- Karosa ŠD 11 – a long-distance coach intended for long routes or tours.
- Karosa ŠM 16,5 – a four-door articulated city bus (produced only as a prototype).

== Gallery ==
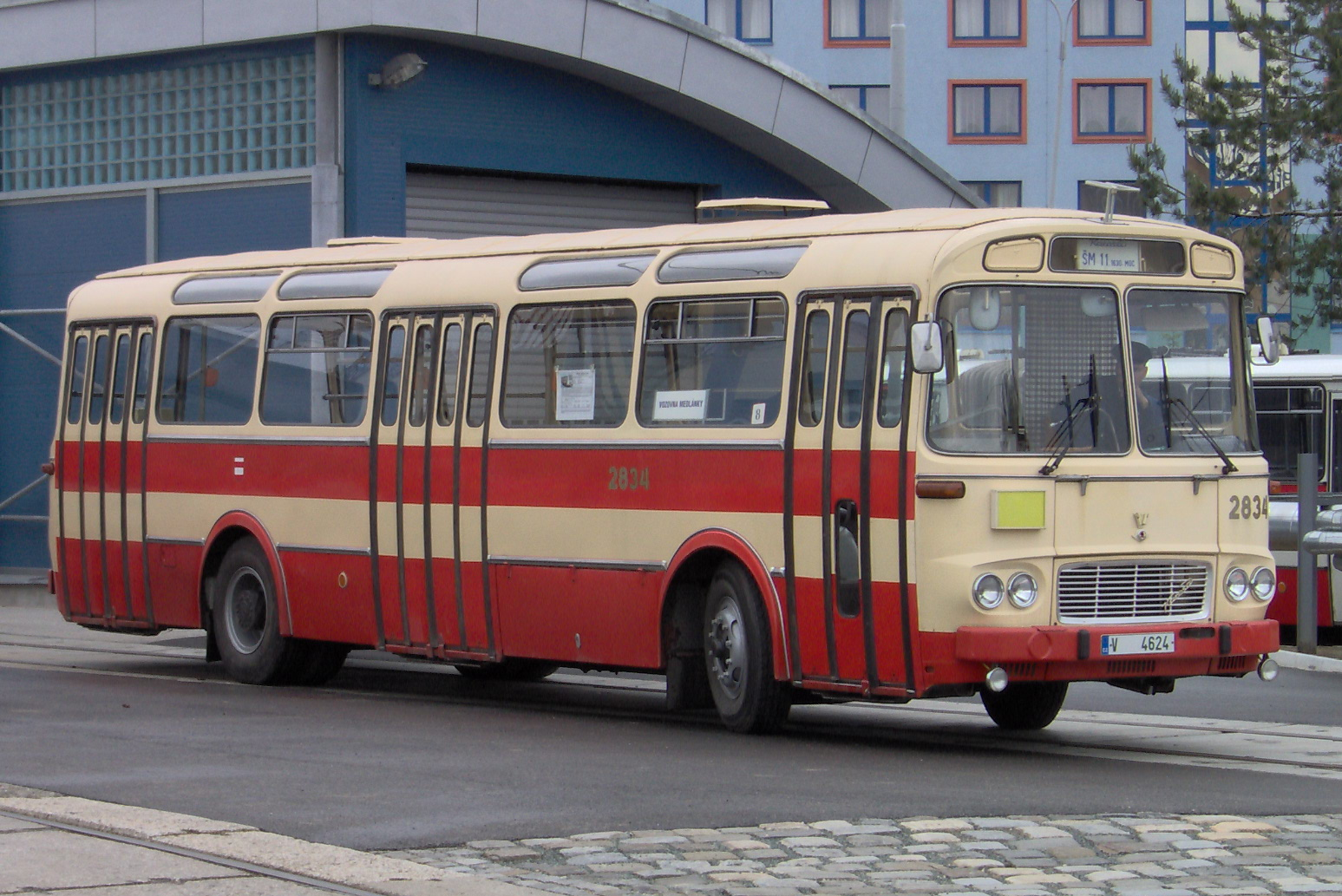
Karosa ŠM 11

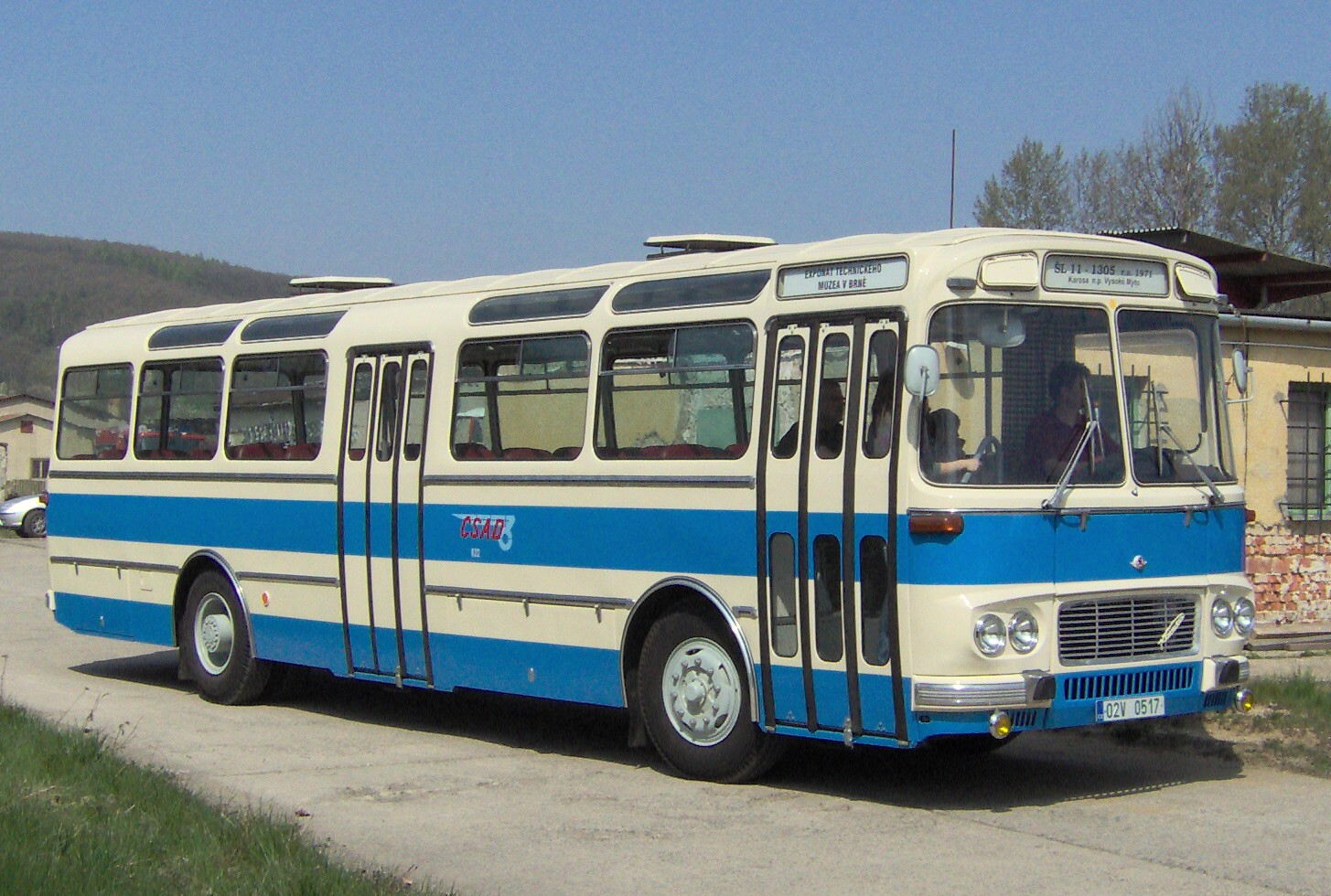
Karosa ŠL 11

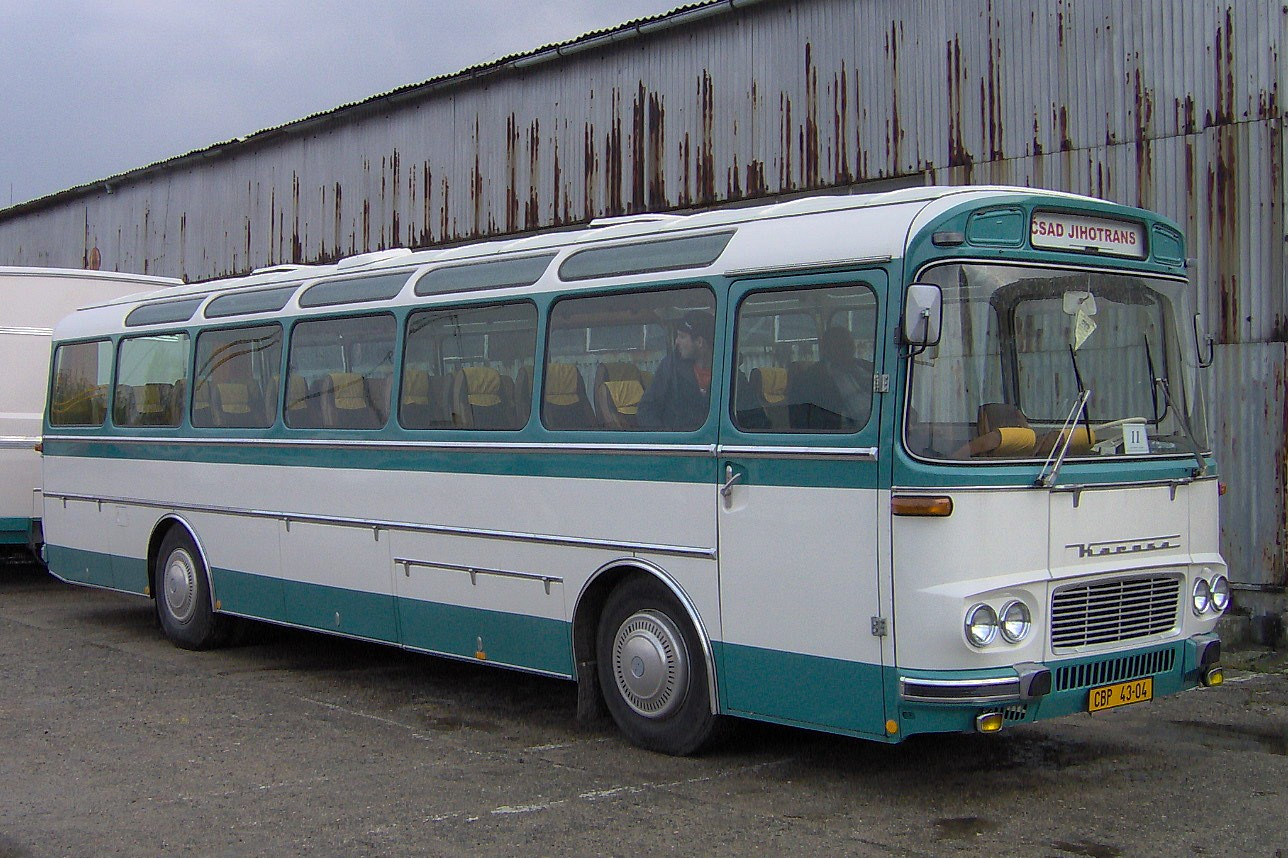
Karosa ŠD 11

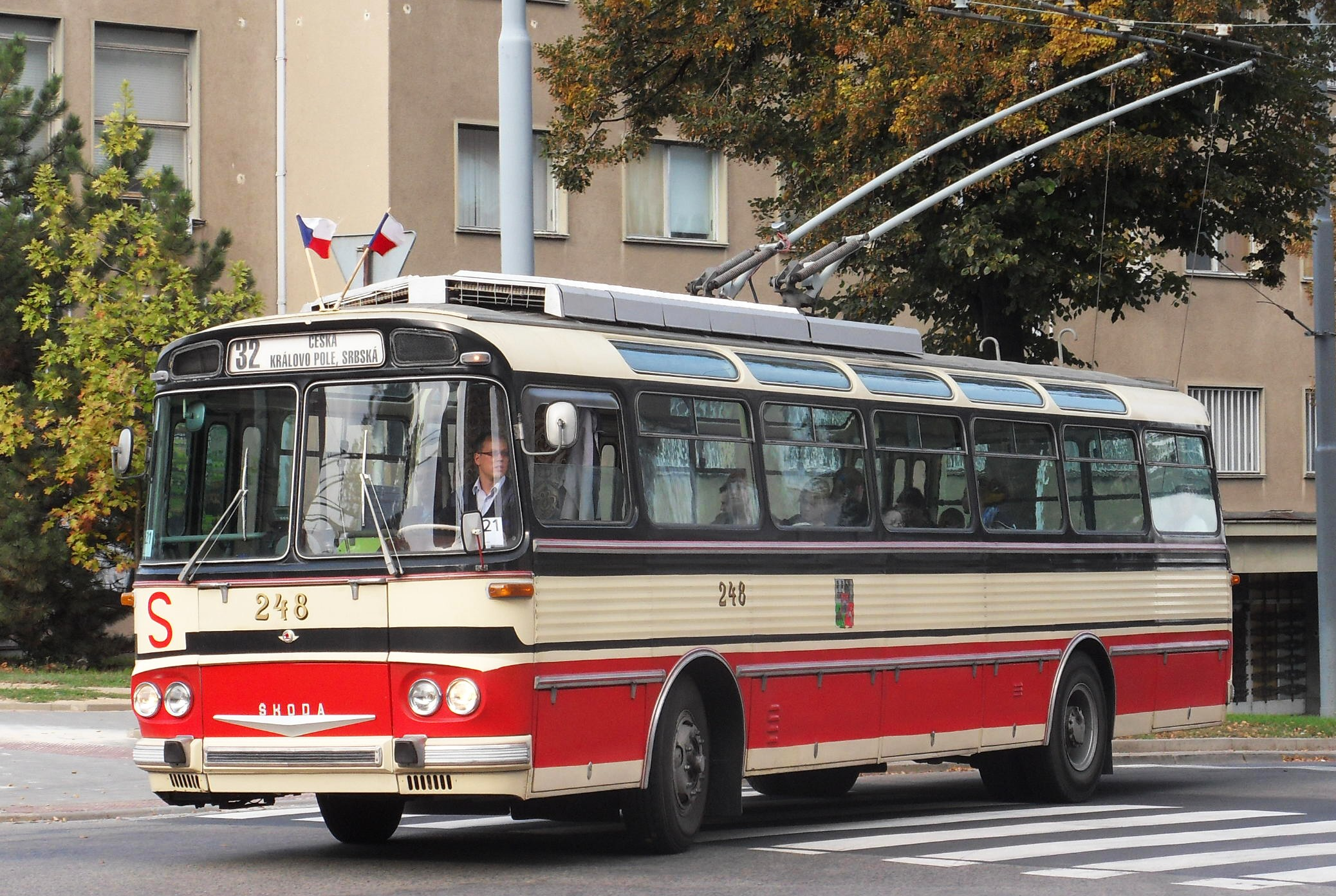
derived trolleybus Škoda T 11

== See also ==
- List of buses
