= Karosa LC 736 =

Type of Czech long-distance coach

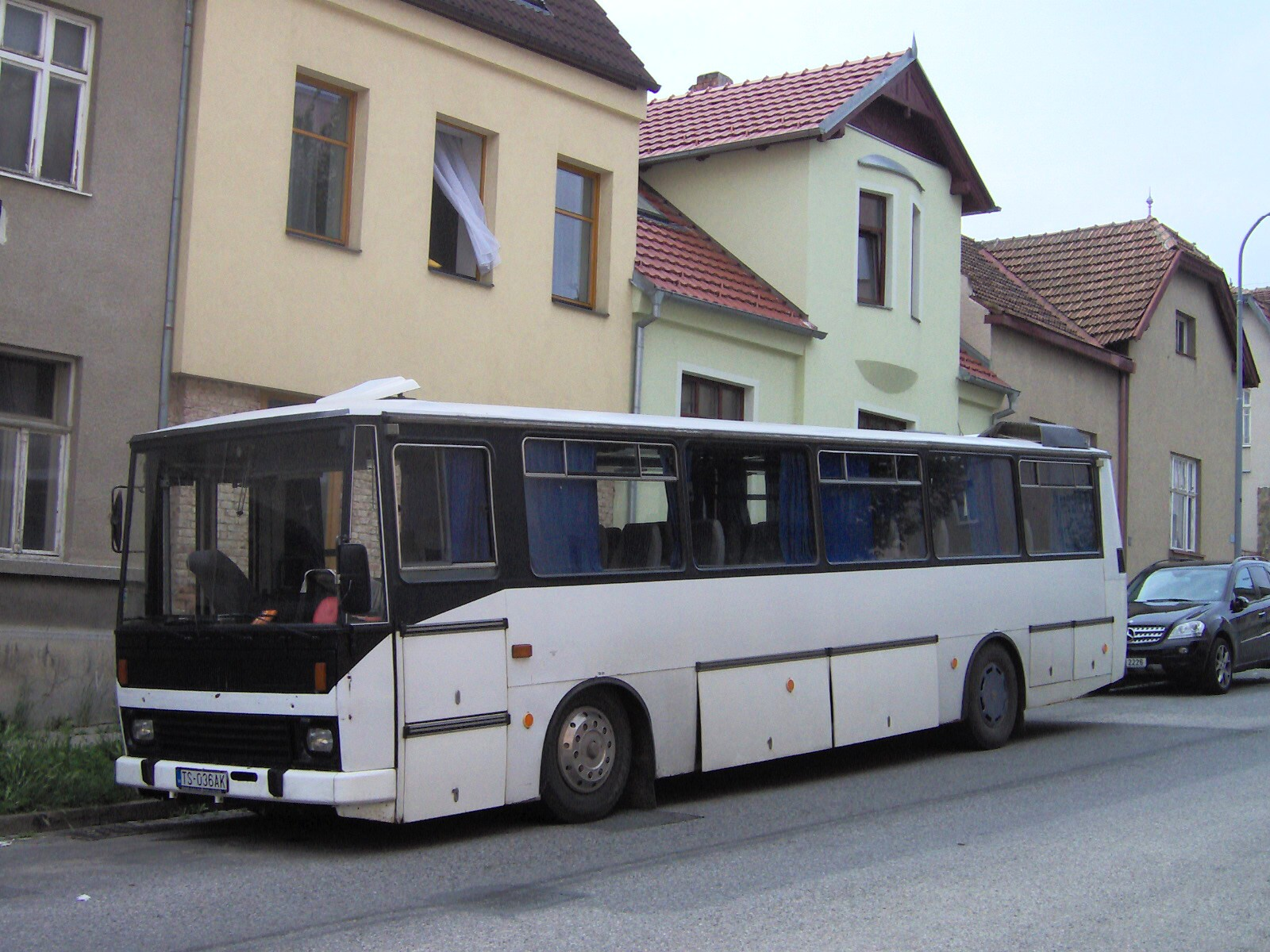
- Karosa LC 736 in Brno, Czech Republic

Overview
- Manufacturer: Karosa

Body and chassis
- Doors: 2, air-operated
- Floor type: High-floor
- Chassis: semi-self-supporting with frame

Powertrain
- Engine: LIAZ ML 636 straight-6 Diesel engine LIAZ ML 637 straight-6 Diesel engine
- Capacity: 44 sitting 0 standing
- Power output: 152 kW (204 hp) (LIAZ ML 636); 189 kW (253 hp) (LIAZ ML 637)
- Transmission: Praga 5-speed manual Praga 8-speed manual

Dimensions
- Length: 11,055 mm (435.2 in)
- Width: 2,500 mm (98.4 in)
- Height: 3,165 mm (124.6 in)
- Curb weight: 9,900 kg (21,826 lb)

Chronology
- Predecessor: Karosa LC 735
- Successor: Karosa LC 936

Karosa LC 736 is a long-distance coach produced from 1984 to 1996 by bus manufacturer Karosa from the Czech Republic. It was succeeded by the Karosa LC 936 in 1996.

== Construction features ==
The Karosa LC 736 is a model of the Karosa 700 series. The LC 736 is unified with intercity bus models such as the C 734 and B 732. The body is semi-self-supporting with a frame, and the engine with a manual gearbox is placed in the rear part. Only the rear axle is powered. The front axle is independent, while the rear axle is solid. All axles are mounted on air suspension. On the right side are two doors. The interior features high padded seats. The driver's cab is not separated from the rest of the vehicle.

== Production and operation ==
Serial production started in 1984 and continued until 1996.

Currently, the number of Karosa LC 736 buses in service is decreasing due to the advanced age of the vehicles.

== Historical vehicles ==
Private collections:

- Civic association for saving historic buses and trolleybuses Jihlava (1 bus)
- Historical Association Coach (1 bus)
- MDT Otvovice (1 bus LC 736.00)
- Unknown owner (LC 736.20 1 bus, license plate 1SA 9006)
- ČSAD buses Plzeň (1 bus LC 736.20)
- Private collector (1 bus LC 736.1030, license plate 5C5 1802)
- Busline (1 bus LC 736.1014, license plate SM 60-23)

== See also ==
- List of buses
