= Karosa NO 80 =

Prototype trailer bus

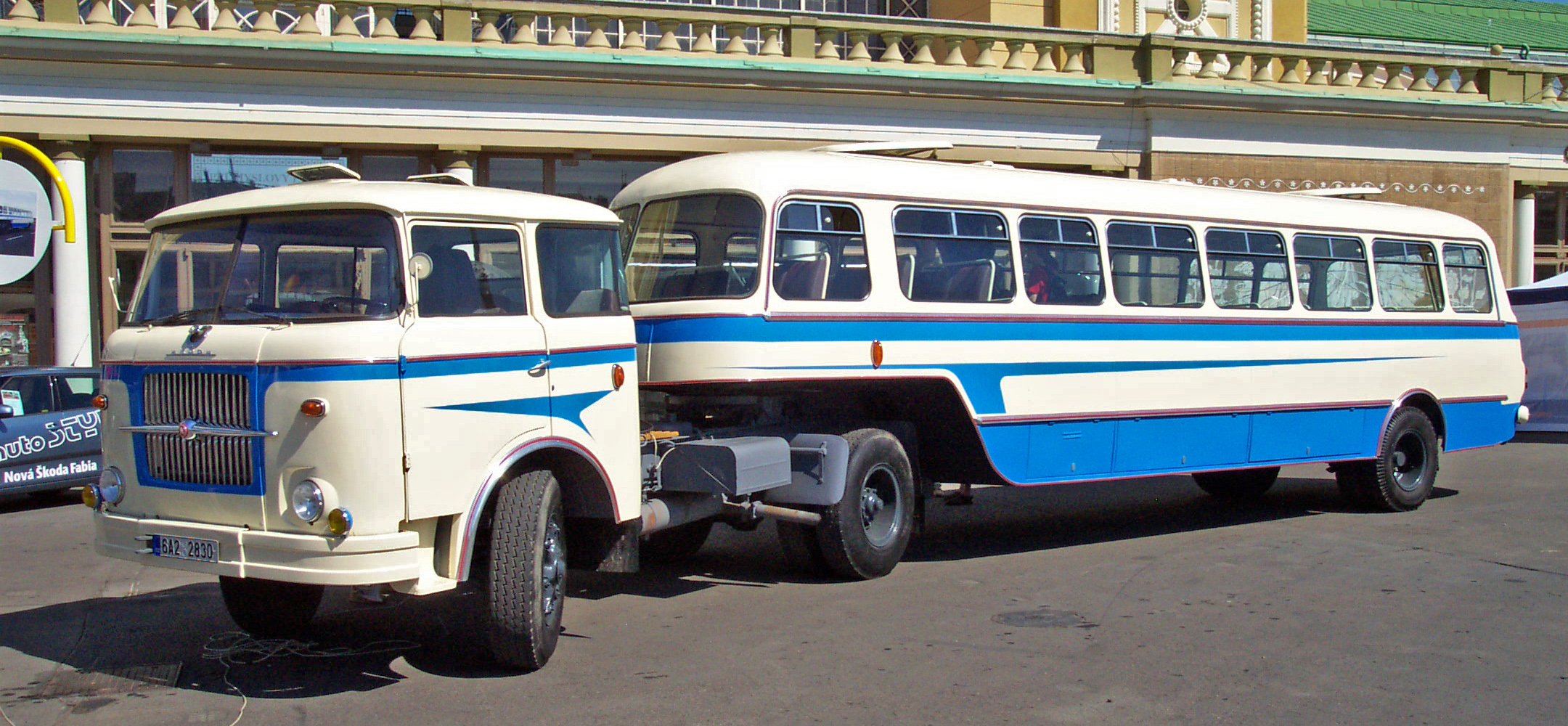
The renovated historic set at the Prague Exhibition: 706 RTTN tractor with trailer Karosa NO 80

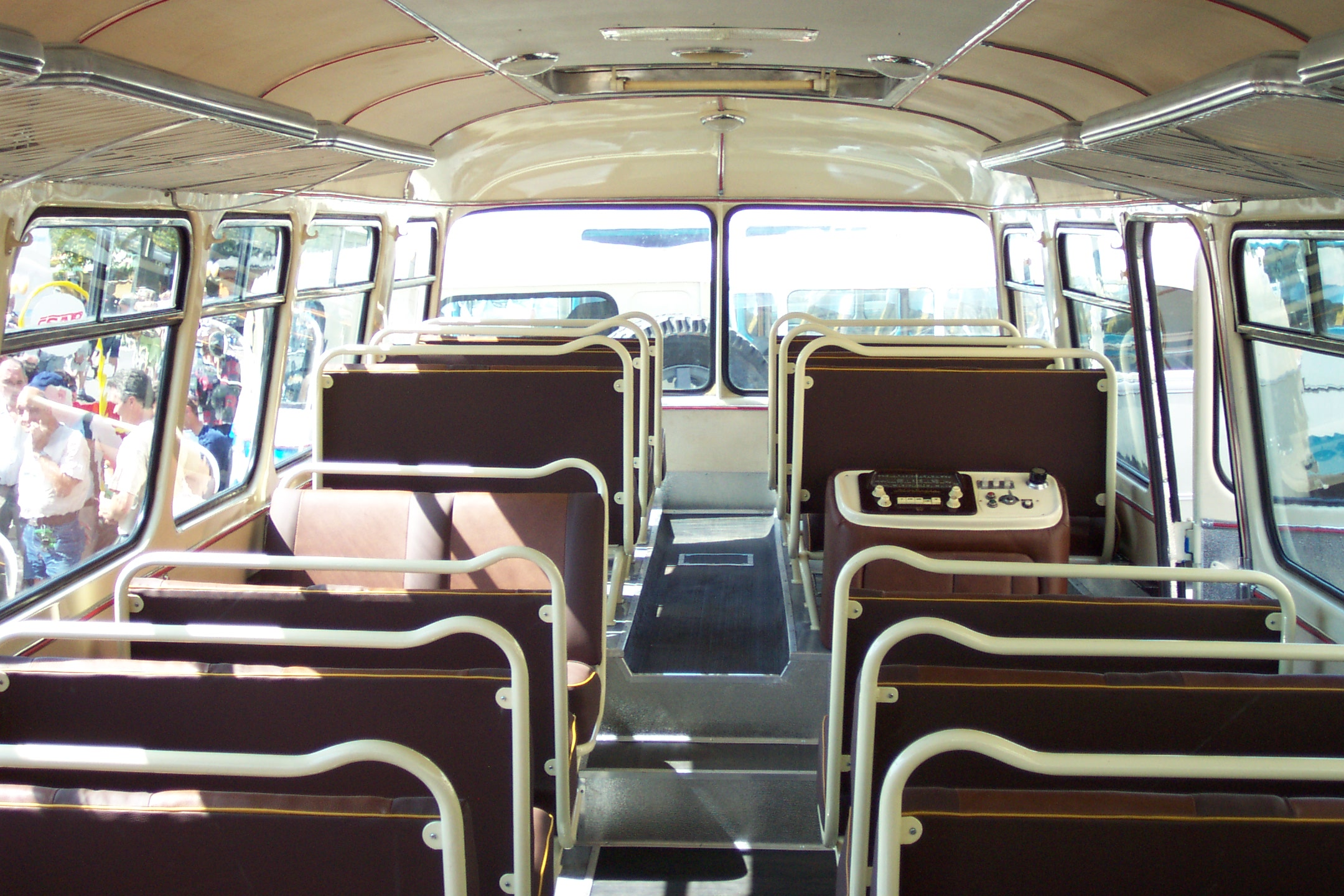
The interior of the trailer NO 80

Karosa NO 80 is a model of bus trailer produced in one prototype at the beginning of the 1960s in Karosa Vysoké Mýto.

== Design ==
Semitrailer NO 80 is based on the design of the bus Škoda 706 RTO. It is a single-axle vehicle, which was hitched up to a classic cargo truck. NO 80 has a semi-self-supporting metal body, which was outside plating, interior lined with Formica. Upholstered seats with leatherette covers were placed crosswise 2 + 2, the central aisle. Entry to the car provided called mechanical percussion doors, which were placed in the right side frame in the front of the trailer. The trailer was equipped with a diesel heater.

== Specifications ==
- Length: 10,550 mm (34 ft 7 3/8 in)
- Width: 2,400 mm (7 ft 10 1/2 in)
- Height: 2,980 mm (9 ft 9 3/8 in)
- Empty carriage weight: 5,500 kg (12,100 lb)
- Total capacity: 80
  - for sitting: 51
  - for standing: 29

== Production and operation ==
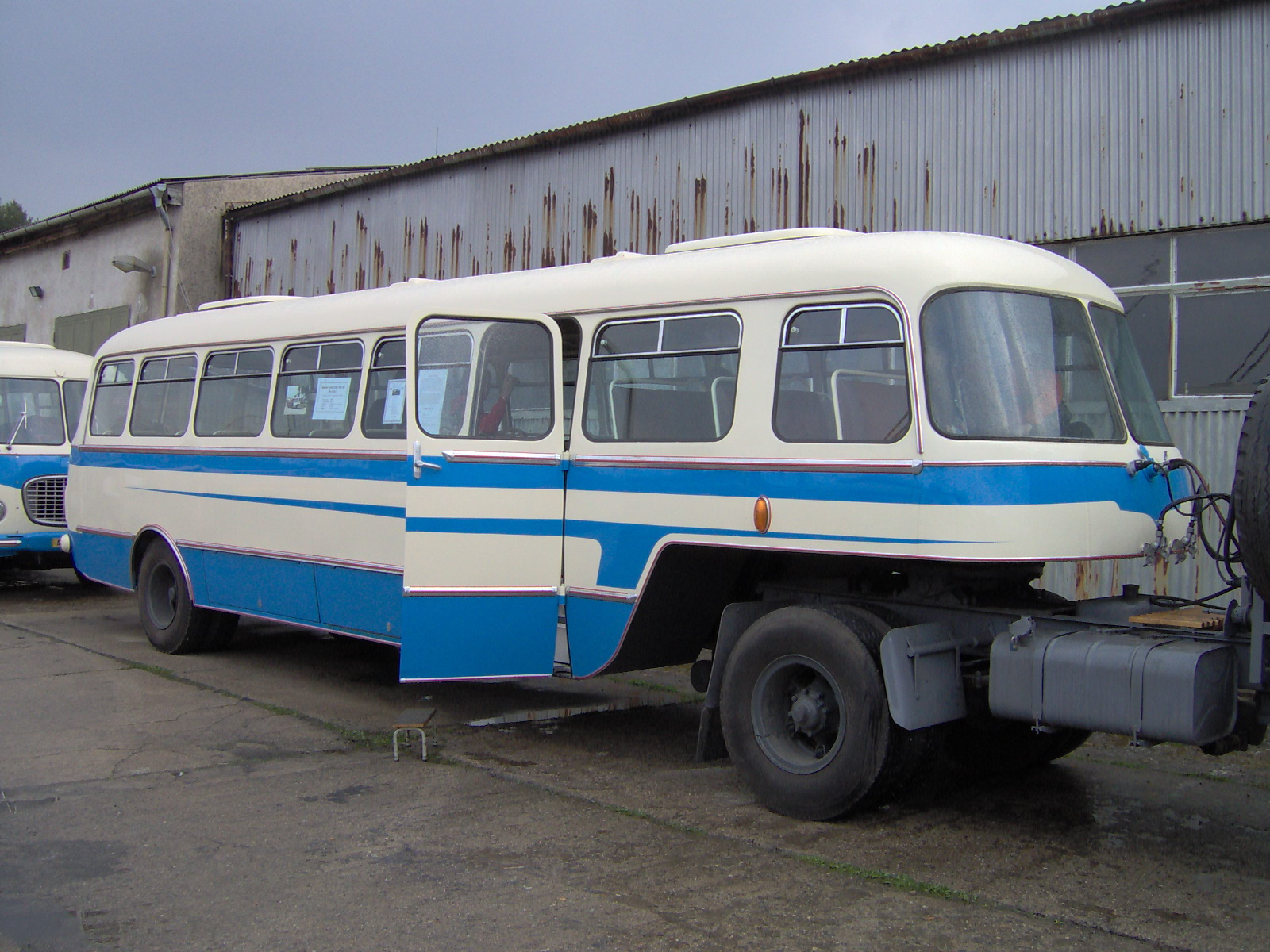
Trailer bus NO 80

The first project concept of a trailer for public transport appeared in 1958. It was decided to manufacture buses of unified series Karosa SB (length 10 m), Škoda 706 RTO (11 m) and Škoda 706 RTO-K (articulated, 16 m), trailer Karosa B 50 and trailer NO 80. the prototype bus trailer was made at the end of the year 1960, and in January 1961 was introduced to the professional public, and then was put into trial operation. As the tractor could be used as a truck 706 RTTN or Tatra 137. The advantage of a personal trailer was a possibility if anytime disconnect and replace trailer cargo (such as import workers for the construction and then the material on the site). Prospectively, there was also the military option. But at the time of construction of the prototype, Karosa developed a new bus Š series, so that a unified series with mass production finally received only bus RTO.

Prototype trailer NO 80 was in trial operation in several bus enterprises (e.g. Tábor, Bratislava, Gottwaldov, Brno, etc.). Then in 1962 it was permanently passed to ČSAD Bratislava and was used around the town of Šaľa in the Nitra region in the western part of Slovakia, and ran for 17 years. Tractor 706 RTTN was brought in when employees in enterprises also used it in freight transport (as originally planned).

At the beginning of 21st century the trailer wreck was discovered in Slovakia. Gradually its restoration was demanded. It was first introduced to the public (along with also refurbished tractor 706 RTTN) in the summer of 2007 in Prague. Less than a year later, was first dispatched to the scenic ride with passengers (it was so April 26 th 2008 in Brno).

== See also ==
- Articulated bus
