= Karosa LC 735 =

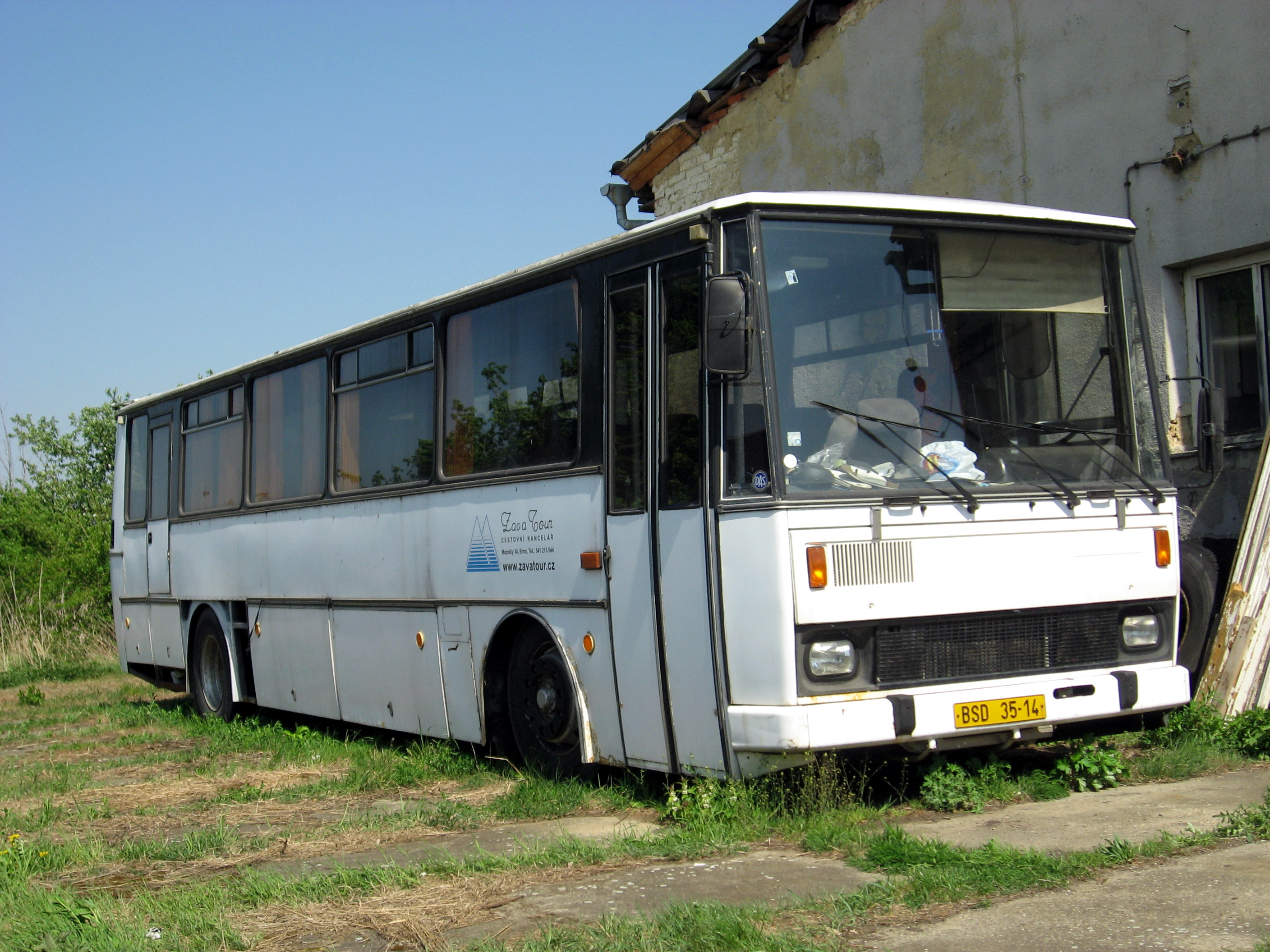
- Karosa LC 735 in Brno, Czech Republic

Overview
- Manufacturer: Karosa

Body and chassis
- Doors: 2, air-operated
- Floor type: High-floor
- Chassis: semi-self-supporting with frame

Powertrain
- Engine: LIAZ ML 635 LIAZ ML 636 LIAZ ML 637
- Capacity: 44 sitting 0 standing
- Power output: 148 kW (LIAZ ML635) 155 kW (LIAZ ML 636) 189 kW (LIAZ ML 637)
- Transmission: Praga 5-speed manual

Dimensions
- Length: 11055 mm
- Width: 2500 mm
- Height: 3165 mm
- Curb weight: 9900kg

Chronology
- Predecessor: Karosa ŠD 11
- Successor: Karosa LC 736

Karosa LC 735 is a long-distance coach produced from 1983 to 1991 by bus manufacturer Karosa from the Czech Republic. It was succeeded by Karosa LC 736 in 1991.

== Construction features ==
The Karosa LC 735 is a model of Karosa 700 series. The LC 735 is a modified version of the inter city bus models C 734 and C 735. The body is semi-self-supporting with frame and the engine with manual gearbox behind the rear axle. Only the rear axle is powered. The front axle is independent, while the rear axle is solid. All axles are mounted on air suspension. On the right side are two doors. The front doors are hinged, while the rear doors (behind the rear axle) are single and usually serve only as an emergency exit. Comfortable adjustable leather seats are provided for passengers, distributed in 2 + 2 across a central aisle. The seats are raised from the aisle height to provide a luggage compartment below, between the axles. The luggage compartment has a volume of 5 m^{3}. Above the seats are fitted mesh shelves for passenger hand luggage (unlike type LC 736, where the shelves are solid, and equipped with air vents above each seat). Near the front door is often placed a folding seat for a tour guide. The driver's cab is not separated from the rest of the vehicle.

== Production and operation ==
Serial production started in 1983, and continued until 1991.

Currently, the number of Karosa LC 735 buses is decreasing, due to high age of buses.

== Historical vehicles ==
Private collections:

- Civic association for saving historic buses and trolleybuses Jihlava (1 bus)
- ŠKODA – BUS club Plzeň (1 bus, year 1983)
- Private collector (1 bus LC 735.20, license plate DO 34–05)
- Private collector (1 bus, ex TMT)
- Private collector (1 bus LC 735.00, located in Slovakia)
- Unknown owner (1 bus LC 735.00, license plate 7S1 4700)
- Unknown owner (1 bus LC 735.00 1, located in the Slovakia)
- Sokol Čechovice (1 bus LC 735.00)

== See also ==
- List of buses
