= Karosa C 744 =

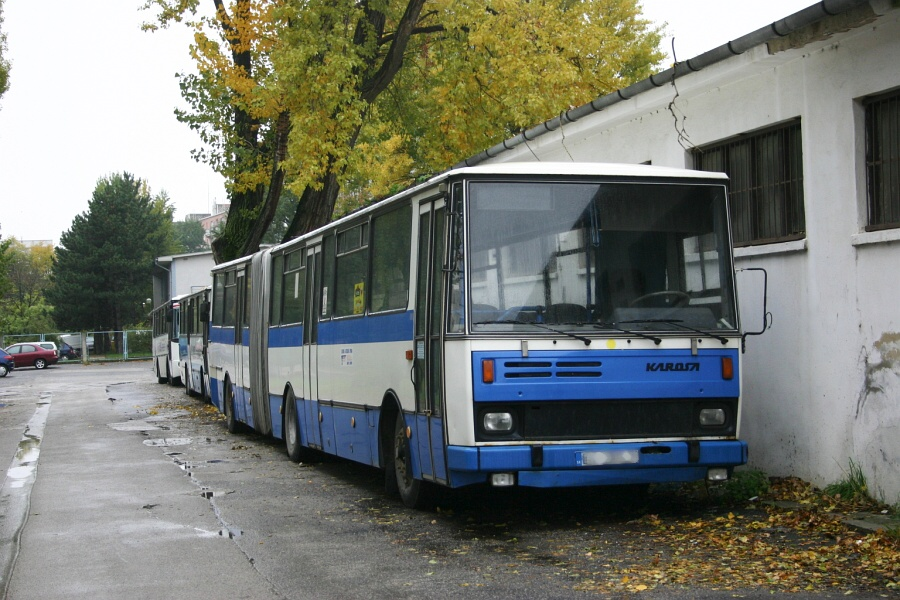
- Karosa C 744 in Slovakia

Overview
- Manufacturer: Karosa

Body and chassis
- Doors: 3, air-operated
- Floor type: High-floor
- Chassis: semi-self-supporting with frame

Powertrain
- Engine: LIAZ ML637S V6 Diesel engine
- Capacity: 60 sitting 70 standing
- Power output: 190 kW (255 hp) (LIAZ ML637S)
- Transmission: Praga 5-speed manual Praga 8-speed manual

Dimensions
- Length: 17,355 mm (683.3 in)
- Width: 2,500 mm (98.4 in)
- Height: 3,165 mm (124.6 in)
- Curb weight: 13,800 kg (30,400 lb)

Chronology
- Successor: Karosa C 943

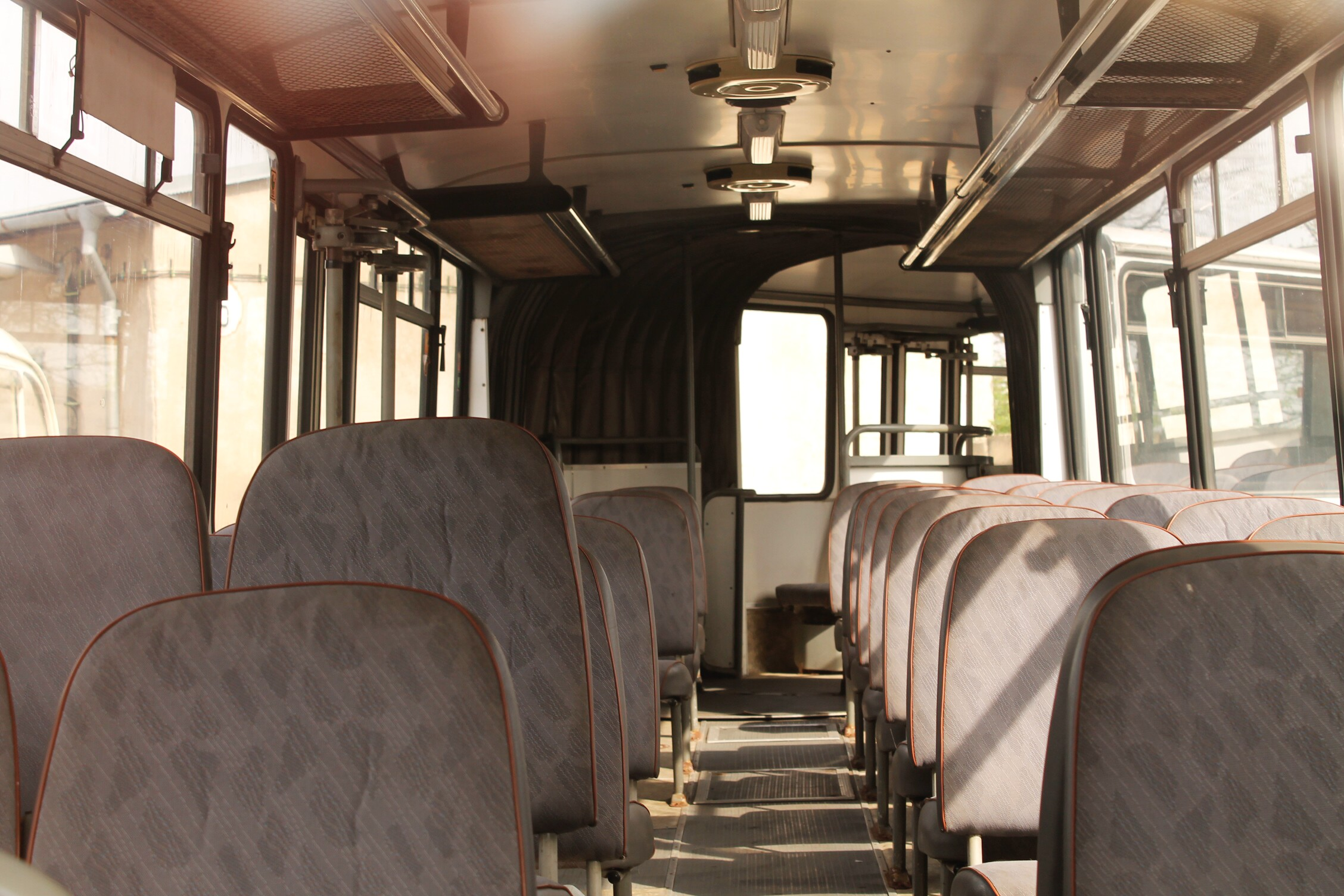
Interior of Karosa C 744

Karosa C 744 is an articulated intercity bus produced from 1988 to 1992 in Czechoslovakia by the bus manufacturer Karosa. It was succeeded by Karosa C 943 in 1997.

== Construction features ==
Karosa C 744 is a model of the Karosa 700 series, an articulated version of the intercity bus models C 734 and C 735. It is made of two rigid sections linked by a pivoting joint. Body is semi-self-supporting with frame and engine with manual gearbox in the rear part. Only third C axle is propulsed, meaning that this articulated bus has pusher configuration. Front axle is independent, middle and rear axles are solid. All axles mounted on air suspension. The bus has three doors on the right side and leatherette seats. Driver's cab is not separated from the rest of the vehicle. Buses has an open design of turntable.

== Production and operation ==
Prototype of Karosa C 744 was made in the year 1986. Serial production started in 1988, and continued until 1992.

== Historical vehicles ==
- Private collector in Slovakia (1 bus)
- Technical museum in Brno, Czech Republic (1 bus)

== See also ==
- List of buses
