= Karosa C 943 =

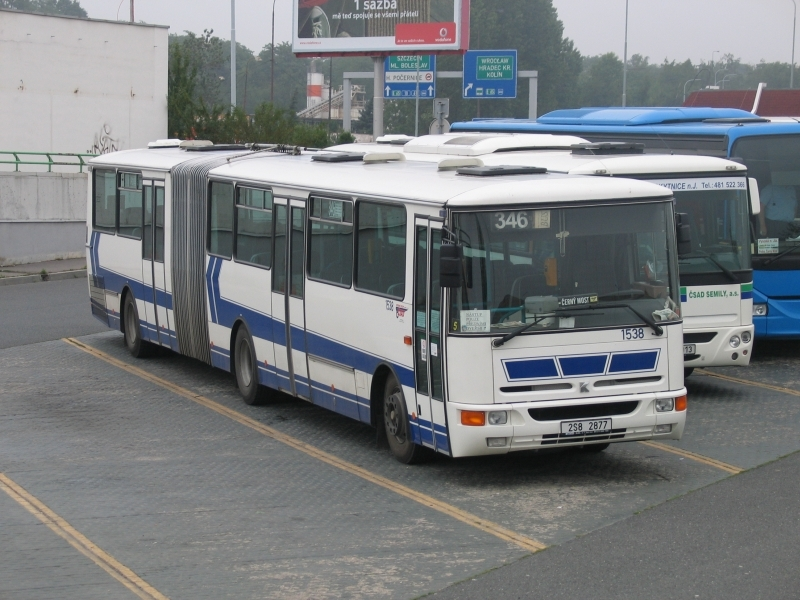
- Karosa C943

Overview
- Manufacturer: Karosa

Body and chassis
- Doors: 3, air-operated
- Floor type: High-floor
- Chassis: semi-self-supporting with frame

Powertrain
- Engine: LIAZ ML636N Euro II V6 Diesel engine
- Capacity: 53 sitting 79 standing
- Power output: 175 kW (235 hp) (LIAZ)
- Transmission: ZF 5-speed automatic

Dimensions
- Length: 17,615 mm (693.5 in)
- Width: 2,500 mm (98.4 in)
- Height: 3,165 mm (124.6 in)
- Curb weight: 14,300 kg (31,500 lb)

Chronology
- Predecessor: Karosa C 744

Karosa C 943 is an articulated intercity bus produced by bus manufacturer Karosa from the Czech Republic, in the years of 1997 to 2001. Its production was stopped without any successor.

== Construction features ==
Karosa C 943 is model of Karosa 900 series. C 943 is derived from Karosa B 941, and also unified with intercity models such as C 934 and C 935. It is made of two rigid sections linked by a pivoting joint. Body is semi-self-supporting with frame and engine with automatic gearbox is placed in the rear part. Only third C axle is propulsed, meaning that this articulated bus has pusher configuration. Front axle is independent, middle and rear axles are solid. All axles mounted on air suspension. On the right side are three doors (first are narrower than middle doors). Inside are used leatherette seats. Drivers cab is not separated from the rest of the vehicle. Buses has an open design of turntable.

== Production and operation ==
Serial production started in 1997 and production continued until 2001. Between the years 1997 and 2001 was made 27 buses mainly for transport companies in Czech Republic and Slovakia.
Currently, number of Karosa C943 buses is reduced, due to high age of the buses.
C 943 buses were not as the only type of 930/940 series made in the modernised E version, although it was reportedly considered.
During January 2013 was still 23 of these buses in service.

== See also ==
- List of buses
