= Karosa C 735 =

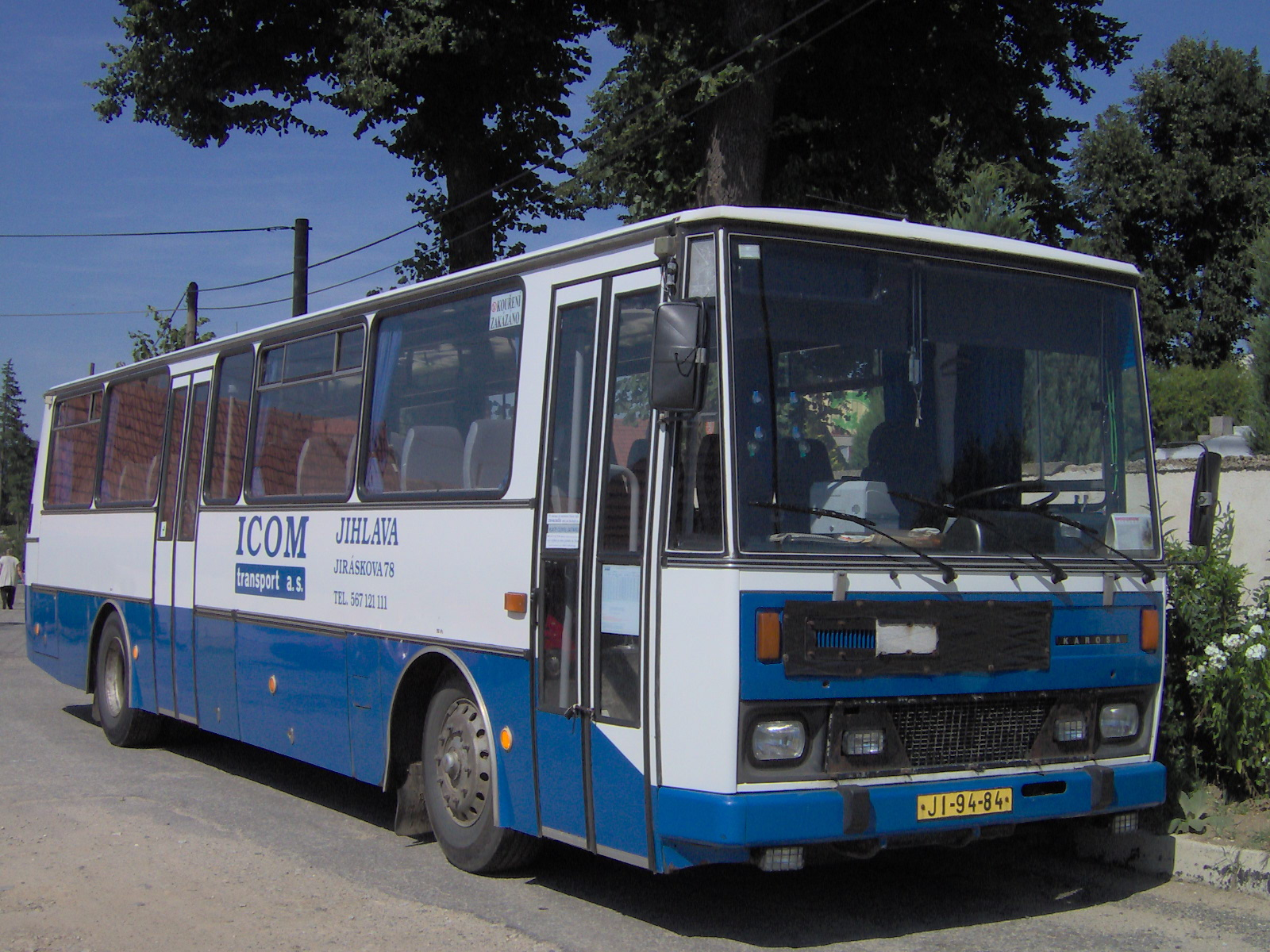
- Karosa C 735 in Jablonec nad Nisou, Czech Republic

Overview
- Manufacturer: Karosa

Body and chassis
- Doors: 2, air-operated
- Floor type: High-floor
- Chassis: semi-self-supporting with frame

Powertrain
- Engine: LIAZ ML 636 N V6 Diesel engine
- Power output: 155 kW (208 hp) (LIAZ ML 636 N)
- Transmission: Praga 5-speed manual

Dimensions
- Length: 11,055 mm (435.2 in)
- Width: 2,500 mm (98.4 in)
- Height: 3,165 mm (124.6 in)
- Curb weight: 9,900 kg (21,800 lb)

Chronology
- Predecessor: Karosa LC 735
- Successor: Karosa C 935

Karosa C 735 is an intercity bus produced by bus manufacturer Karosa from the Czech Republic, in the years 1992 to 1997. It was succeeded by Karosa C 935 in 1997.

== Construction features ==
Karosa C 735 is a model of Karosa 700 series, a C 734 with a stronger engine. The body is semi-self-supporting with frame and engine with manual gearbox in the rear part. Only rear axle is propulsed. Front axle is independent, rear axle is solid. All axles are mounted on air suspension. On the right side are two doors. The bus has leatherette seats. Drivers cab is not separated from the rest of the vehicle.

== Production and operation ==
In 1992, serial production started, which continued until 1997.

Currently, the number of Karosa C734 buses is decreasing, due to their growing age.

== See also ==
- List of buses
