= Karosa B 731 =

Type of urban bus

Karosa B731
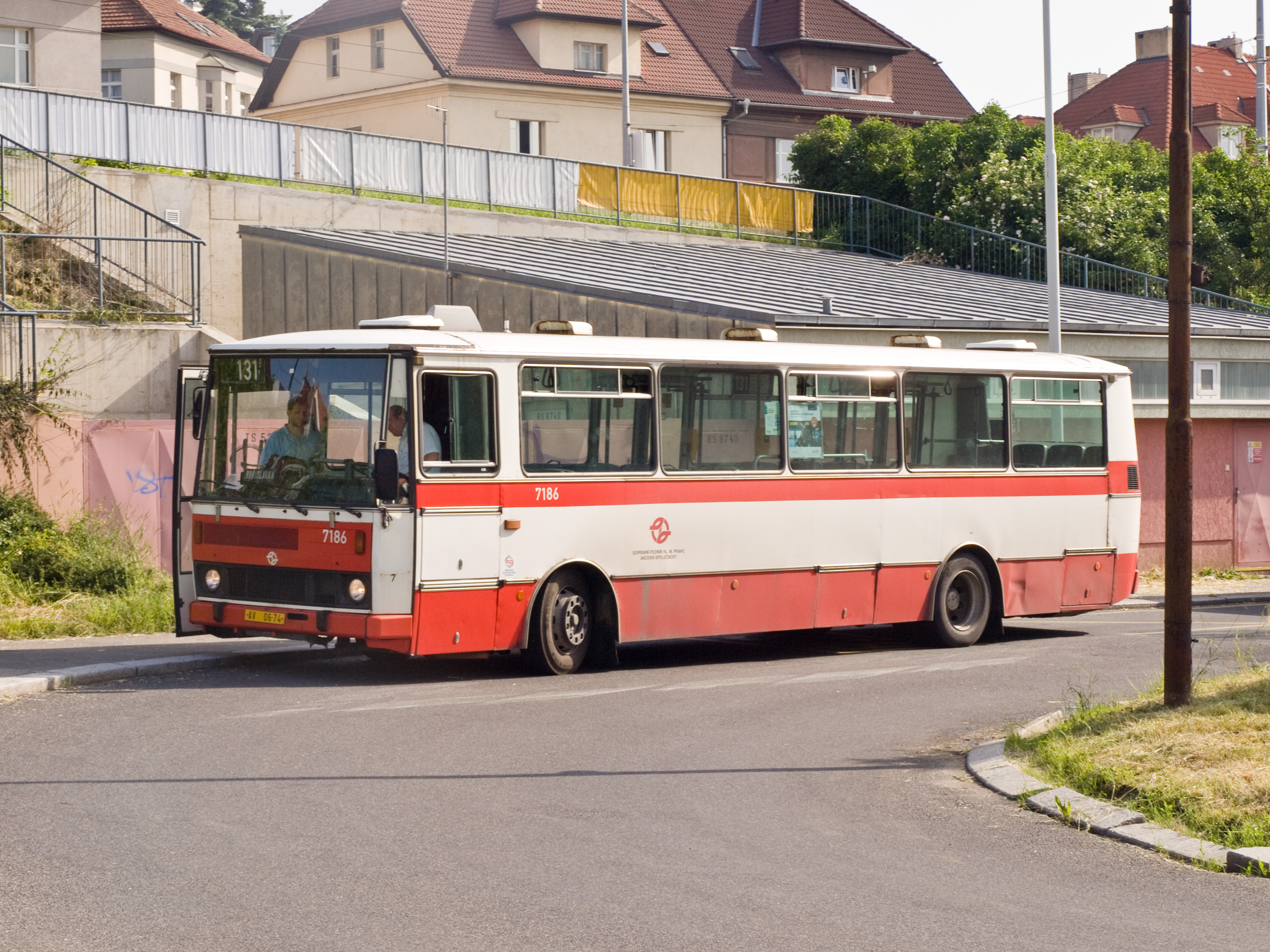
- Last Prague Karosa B731 no.7186 from 1995 with old plastic destination boards. Retired in 2010.

Overview
- Manufacturer: Karosa

Body and chassis
- Doors: 3, air-operated
- Floor type: High-floor
- Chassis: semi-self-supporting with frame

Powertrain
- Engine: LIAZ ML635 LIAZ ML636E V6 Diesel engine LIAZ ML636N V6 Diesel engine LIAZ ML637S V6 Diesel engine Renault MIHR 62045 V6 Diesel engine
- Power output: 148 kW (198 hp) (LIAZ ML 635) 155 kW (208 hp) (LIAZ ML 636 N); 175 kW (235 hp) (LIAZ ML 636 E); 151 kW (202 hp) (LIAZ ML 637 S) 151 kW (202 hp) (Renault MIHR 62045)
- Transmission: Praga 2-speed automatic Voith DIWA 3-speed automatic ZF 4-speed automatic

Dimensions
- Length: 11,055 mm (435.2 in)
- Width: 2,500 mm (98.4 in)
- Height: 3,165 mm (124.6 in)
- Curb weight: 9,500 kg (20,900 lb)-10,500 kg (23,100 lb)

Chronology
- Predecessor: Karosa ŠM 11
- Successor: Karosa B 931

Karosa B 731 is an urban bus produced from 1982 to 1996 by bus manufacturer Karosa from the Czechoslovakia. It was succeeded by Karosa B 931 in 1996.

== Construction features ==
Karosa B 731 is a model of the Karosa 700 series. The B 731 is derived from the Karosa C 734 intercity bus, and also unified with city bus models such as the B 741 and the B 732. The body is semi-self-supporting with frame and engine with automatic gearbox in the rear part. The engine drives only the rear axle. The front axle is independent, while the rear axle is solid. All axles are mounted on air suspension. On the right side are three doors (first are narrower than middle doors). Inside are used leatherette seats, plastic Vogelsitze or Fainsa seats. The driver's cab is separated from the rest of the vehicle by a glazed partition (the first series produced until 1984 did not have a partition). In the middle, or in the rear part is room for a pram or wheelchair.

Type B 731 (as well as whole 700 series) underwent during its long production many changes and modifications. Among the most significant belonged replacing of the noisy rear axles Rába with another that has not produced so much noise, change of the engine mounting and change the location of alternator, use of several types of engines LIAZ, initially aspirated, turbocharged later. In newer buses have also been used automatic gearbox Voith (apparently from 1991) instead of the product of Praga. Began to be mounted exhaust gas catalysators EKOS and between 1993 and 1994, the buses were equipped with intercooler and intake air (due to meet emission standards Euro1), which also led to modifications of the body – behind the third door was placed the intake grille. In the last buses from the year 1995 appeared motor Renault. These buses were numbered B 731.1659 and were produced in only 50 pieces. Due to the assortment offered gearbox with retarder to the engines LIAZ cars were B 731 since 1994 produced with extended rear (the very first bus with a very similar rear was already made in 1992, it was a prototype B17). These were types B 731.1667 and B 731.1669 with LIAZ engines and Voith gearbox with integrated retarder. The rear panel is identical to then produced 900 series.

== Production and operation ==
Serial production started in 1981 and continued until 1996.

Currently, the number of Karosa B731 buses is decreasing, due to supply of new low-floor buses, for example by SOR NB 12 made in Czech Republic. Last Karosa B731 in Prague was retired on 12 September 2014.

== Historical vehicles ==
- DP Ostrava (bus no. 6160) year 1986
- DP Praha (bus no. 3709) year 1985
- PMDP Plzeň (bus no. 348) year 1986
- DP Bratislava (1 bus B 731.04, formerly KHA SAD Bratislava and SAD Nové Zámky)
- DSZO Zlín (bus no. 655), year 1991
- DP Pardubice (bus no. 129)

Private collections:

- Civic association for saving historic buses and trolleybuses Jihlava (5 buss, one of Jihlava reg. No. 301 and one Pardubice reg. No. 18)
- ŠKODA-BUS club Plzeň (bus no. 385, year 1988)
- MHDT o.s. (Prague buses no. 7186 and 7227, both from the year 1995)
- Private collector (1 bus reg. No. 127, ex DP Opava)
- Private collector (1 bus reg. No. 270, ex DP České Budějovice)
- Private collector (bus B 731.04 ex DP Praha no. 2819)
- Private collector (Prague bus no. 7211)

== See also ==
- (in Slovak) Article about Karosa B731 and B732 in Bratislava
- (in Czech)Article about Karosa B731 in Prague
- (in Czech)Photogallery of Karosa B731 in Brno
- (in Czech)Info about Karosa B 731 a B 732
- (in Czech)Page about major repairs of Karosa B 731.1659 in Prague
- List of buses
