= Karosa ŠM 11 =

Czech urban bus

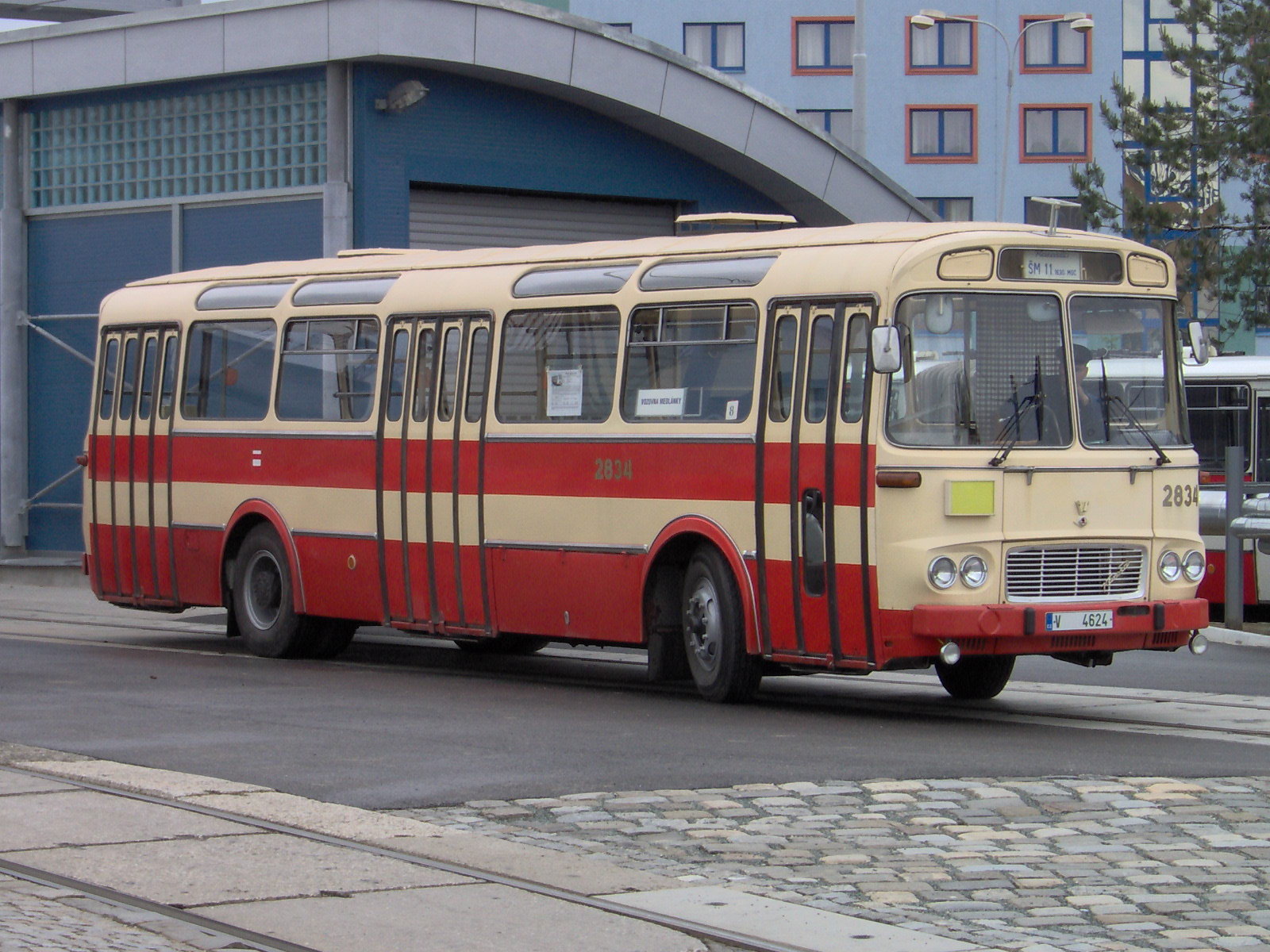
- Historical Karosa ŠM 11 in Brno, Czech Republic

Overview
- Manufacturer: Karosa

Body and chassis
- Doors: 3, air-operated
- Floor type: High-floor
- Chassis: semi-self-supporting with frame

Powertrain
- Engine: Škoda ML 634 SI6 Diesel engine Škoda ML 630 SI6 Diesel engine
- Power output: 132.4 kW (178 hp) (Škoda ML 634); 152.4 kW (204 hp) (Škoda ML 630)
- Transmission: Praga 2-speed automatic Praga 5-speed manual

Dimensions
- Length: 10,985 mm (432.5 in); 11,135 mm (438.4 in)
- Width: 2,500 mm (98.4 in)
- Height: 2,985 mm (117.5 in)
- Curb weight: 7,800 kg (17,200 lb)-8,750 kg (19,290 lb)

Chronology
- Predecessor: Škoda 706 RTO
- Successor: Karosa B 731

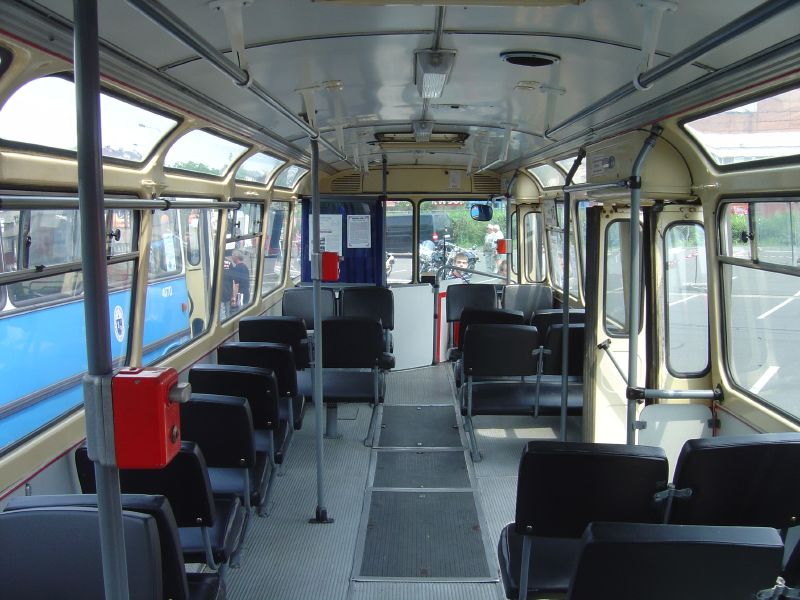
Karosa ŠM 11's interior

The Karosa ŠM 11 is an urban bus produced by the Czechoslovak bus manufacturer Karosa between 1965 and 1981. It was succeeded by the Karosa B 731 in 1981.

== Construction features ==
The Karosa ŠM 11 is completely different from its predecessor, Škoda 706 RTO, which had its engine in the front and two doors. ŠM 11 is a model of Karosa Š series. It was derived from Karosa ŠL 11 intercity bus, and also unified with long-distance coach Karosa ŠD 11. Its body (copied from Berliet PH) is semi-self-supporting with frame and engine with automatic gearbox in the middle, right between the wheels. Only its rear axle is propulsed. Front axle is independent, rear axle is solid. All axles are mounted on air suspension. On the right side are three folding doors (the first is narrower than the other doors). Leatherette seats are used for the seats inside the ŠM 11. Driver's cab is not separated from the rest of the vehicle. In the rear, there is room for a pram or wheelchair.

== Production and operation ==
Production of the ŠM 11 started in 1965 and continued until 1981.

Although ŠM 11 are not operated in public transport anymore, many of them are still being operated as historical vehicles. The last Karosa ŠM 11 in Prague was retired in 1987, and the last ŠM 11 in Czech Republic was retired in 1994 in Opava. About 9,900 Karosa ŠM 11 buses were made during its production. Some buses were also exported to Albania, Bulgaria, Hungary, Mongolia, Poland, Vietnam and Romania.

== Historical vehicles ==
Czech Republic:

- Prague transport company (bus, no.7135, year 1981)
- Technical muzeum Brno (bus ex. Brno transport company no. 2834)
- Ostrava transport company (bus no. č. 5842)
- Zlín (bus ex Prague transport company no. 7174)
- Plzeň (bus ex Plzeň transport company no. 145)
- Busline (bus ex transport company Teplice no. 46)

Slovakia:

- Bratislava (bus no. 3350)
- private collector (bus ex Prague transport company no. 5123)
- KHA Bratislava (bus ex Bratislava transport company no. 1382)
- private collector (pbus ex transport company Plzeň no. 135)

== See also ==
- List of buses
