= Karosa ŠD 11 =

Czech long-distance coach

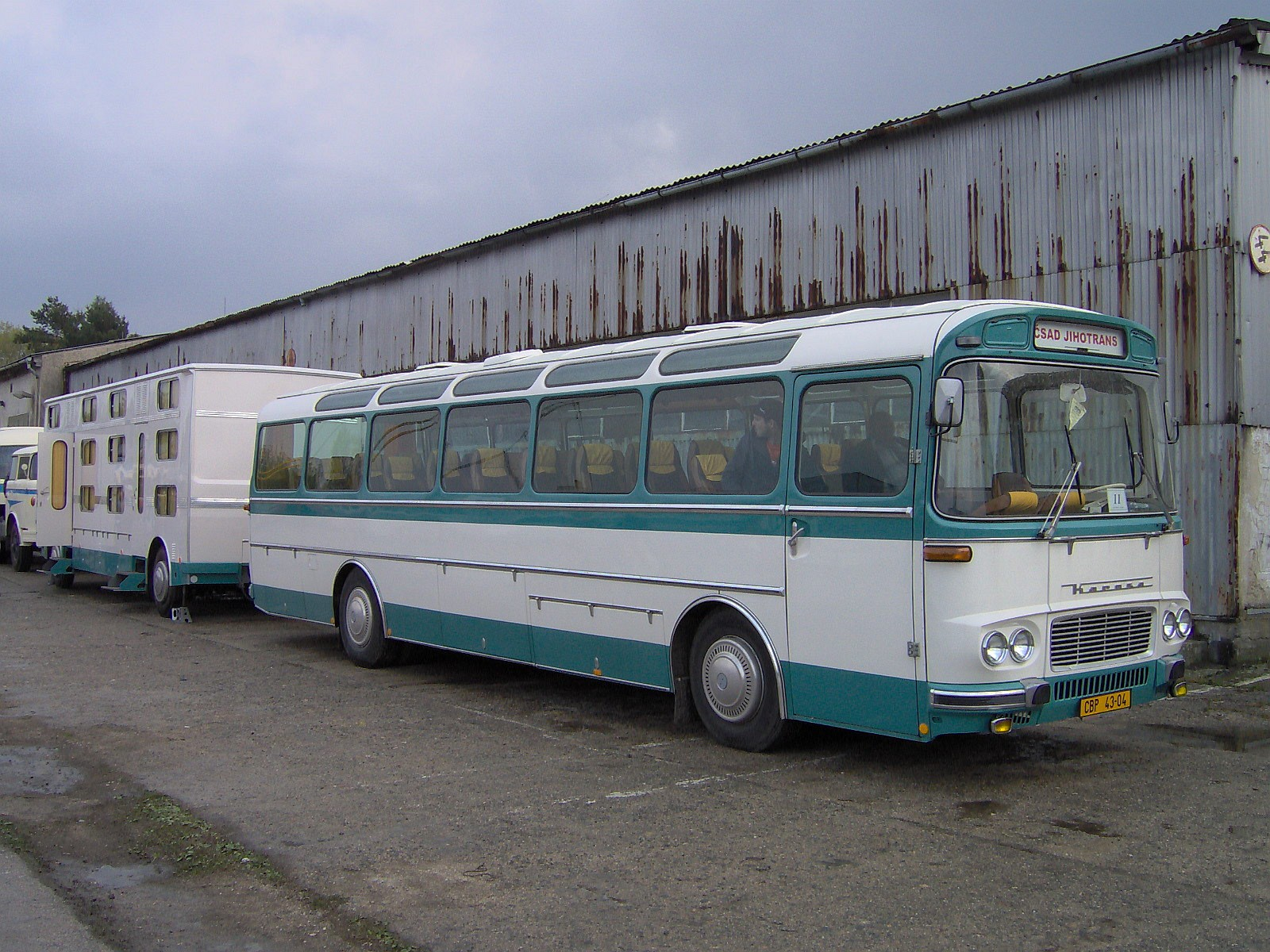
- Historical Karosa ŠD 11 in Brno, Czech Republic

Overview
- Manufacturer: Karosa

Body and chassis
- Doors: 2, air-operated
- Floor type: High-floor
- Chassis: semi-self-supporting with frame

Powertrain
- Engine: Škoda ML634
- Power output: 154,4 kW (Škoda ML 634)
- Transmission: Praga 5-speed manual

Dimensions
- Length: 11180 mm
- Width: 2500 mm
- Height: 2985 mm
- Curb weight: 9200 kg

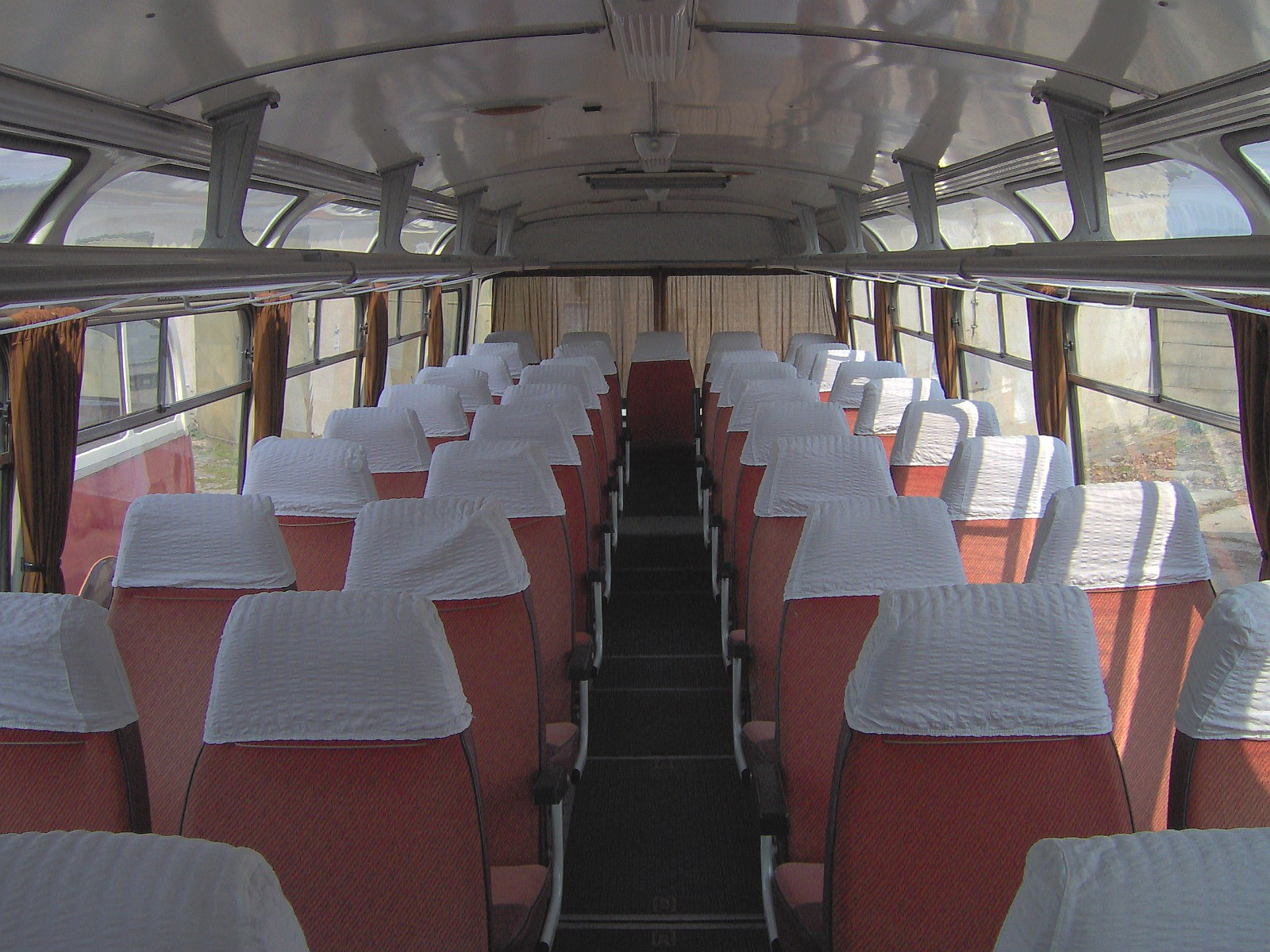
Interior of Karosa ŠD 11

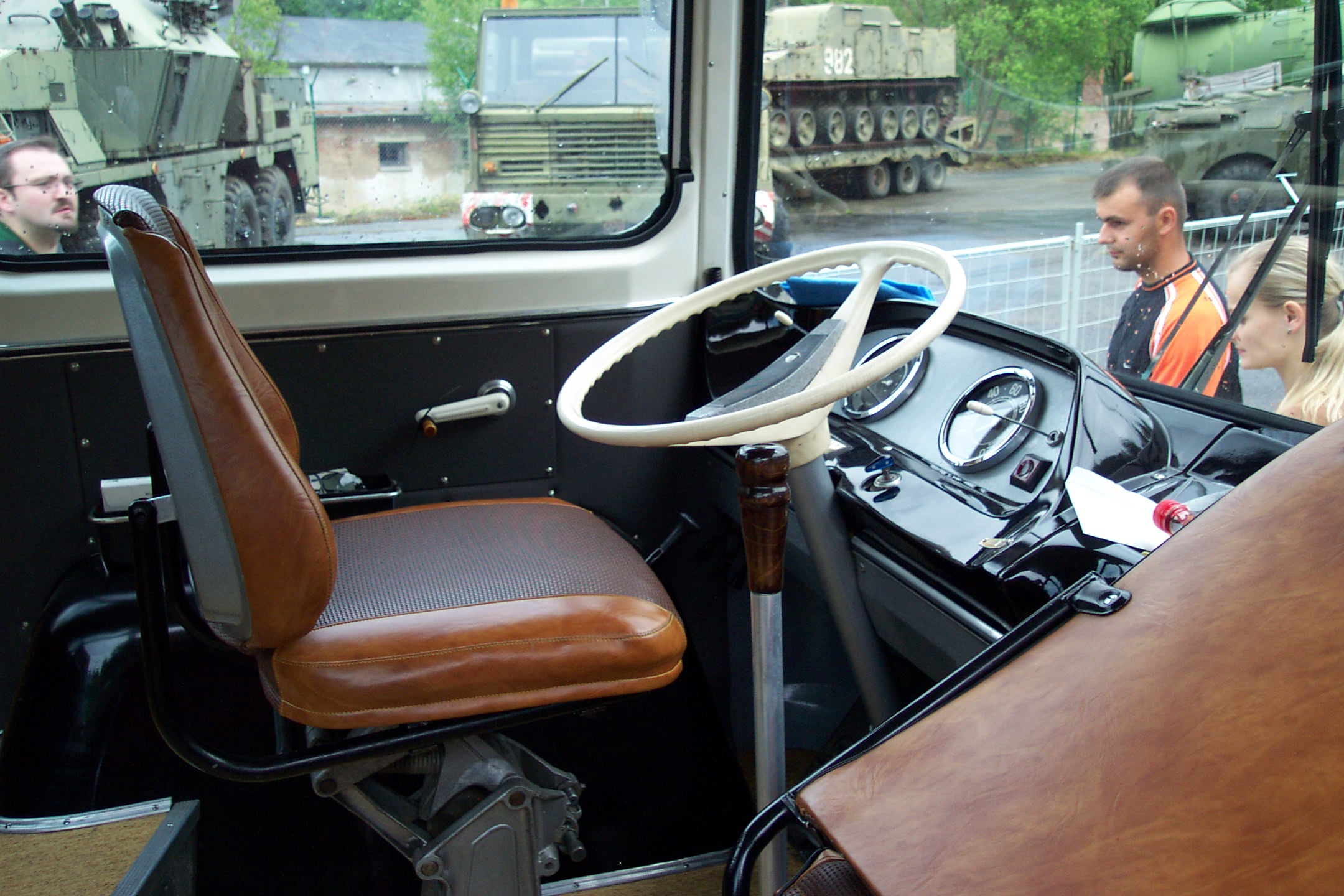
Drivers cab

Karosa ŠD 11 is a long-distance coach produced from 1963 to 1981 by bus manufacturer Karosa from Czechoslovakia. It was succeeded by Karosa LC 735 in 1983.

== Construction features ==
Karosa ŠD 11 is completely different from its predecessor, Škoda 706 RTO-LUX, which had engine in front and two doors. ŠM 11 is model of Karosa Š series. It is derived from Karosa ŠM 11 city bus, and also unified with intercity bus Karosa ŠL 11. Body is semi-self-supporting with frame and engine with manual gearbox in the middle, between the wheels. Only rear axle is propulsed. Front axle is independent, rear axle is solid. All axles are mounted on air suspension. On the right side is one door. Inside are used high padded seats. Driver's cab is not separated from the rest of the vehicle.

== Production and operation ==
In 1974 started serial production, which continued until 1981.

ŠD 11 aren't operated in public transport anymore, but many of them are operated as historical vehicles.

== Historical vehicles ==
- Cvejn bus vehicles (1 bus)
- Bus Jihotrans ("Evropabus' and Rotel Karosa LP 30)
- Kukabus (1 bus)

Private collections:

- Civic association for saving historic buses and trolleybuses Jihlava (2 buses)
- Private collector (1 bus, license plate KE-459IA)
- ŠKODA – BUS club Plzeň (1 bus, year 1977)
- KHA Bratislava (1 bus, version Evropabus)
- Private collector (1 bus, version Evropabus)
- Private collector (1 bus, license plate 6A2 2870, year 1974)
- Private collector (1 bus, license plate 5U3 1895, year 1974)
- Private collector (1 bus, license plate BNA 27–70, year 1974)
- Private collector (1 bus, license plate DO 56–49, year 1974)
- Private collector (1 bus, license plate 3E2 5756, year 1976)
- Private collector (1 bus, license plate KM 78–48, year 1977)
- Private collector (1 bus, license plate 8A9 2750, year 1977)
- Private collector (1 bus, license plate 2J9 7234, year 1978)
- Private collector (1 bus, license plate 1AU 1032, year 1980)
- Private collector (1 bus, SPZ ME 47–57)
- Private collector (1 bus, license plate PT 23–06, year 1979)
- Private collector (1 bus, license plate 1S6 6563, year 1978)
- Private collector (1 bus)
- Private collector (1 bus, license plate 1H9 6668, year 1978)
- Private collector (1 bus, license plate KE-870DS)

== See also ==
- List of buses
