= Karosa 700 series =

Series of Czechoslovak/Czech buses

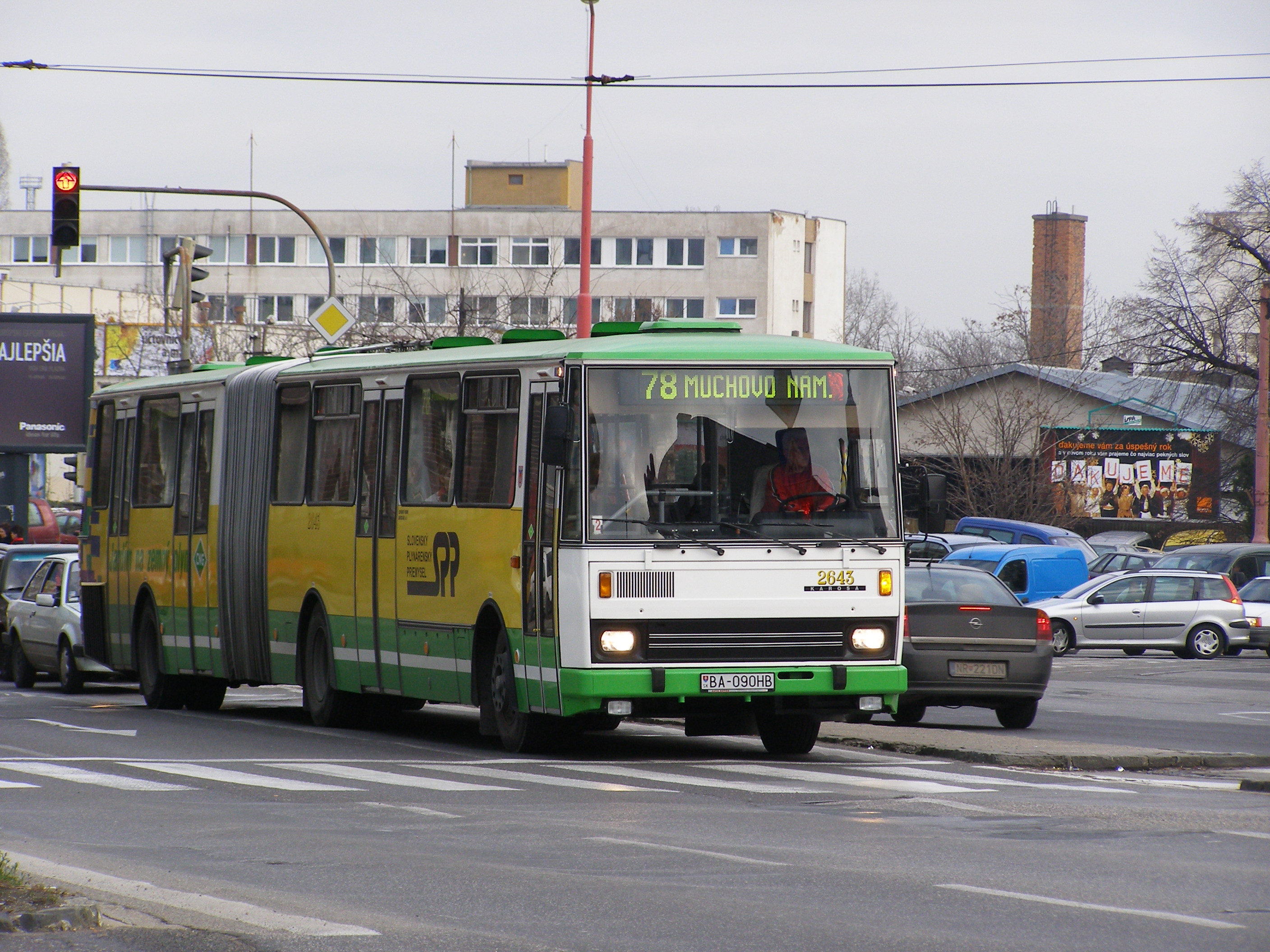
Karosa B 741 rebuilt to run on CNG in Bratislava, Slovakia

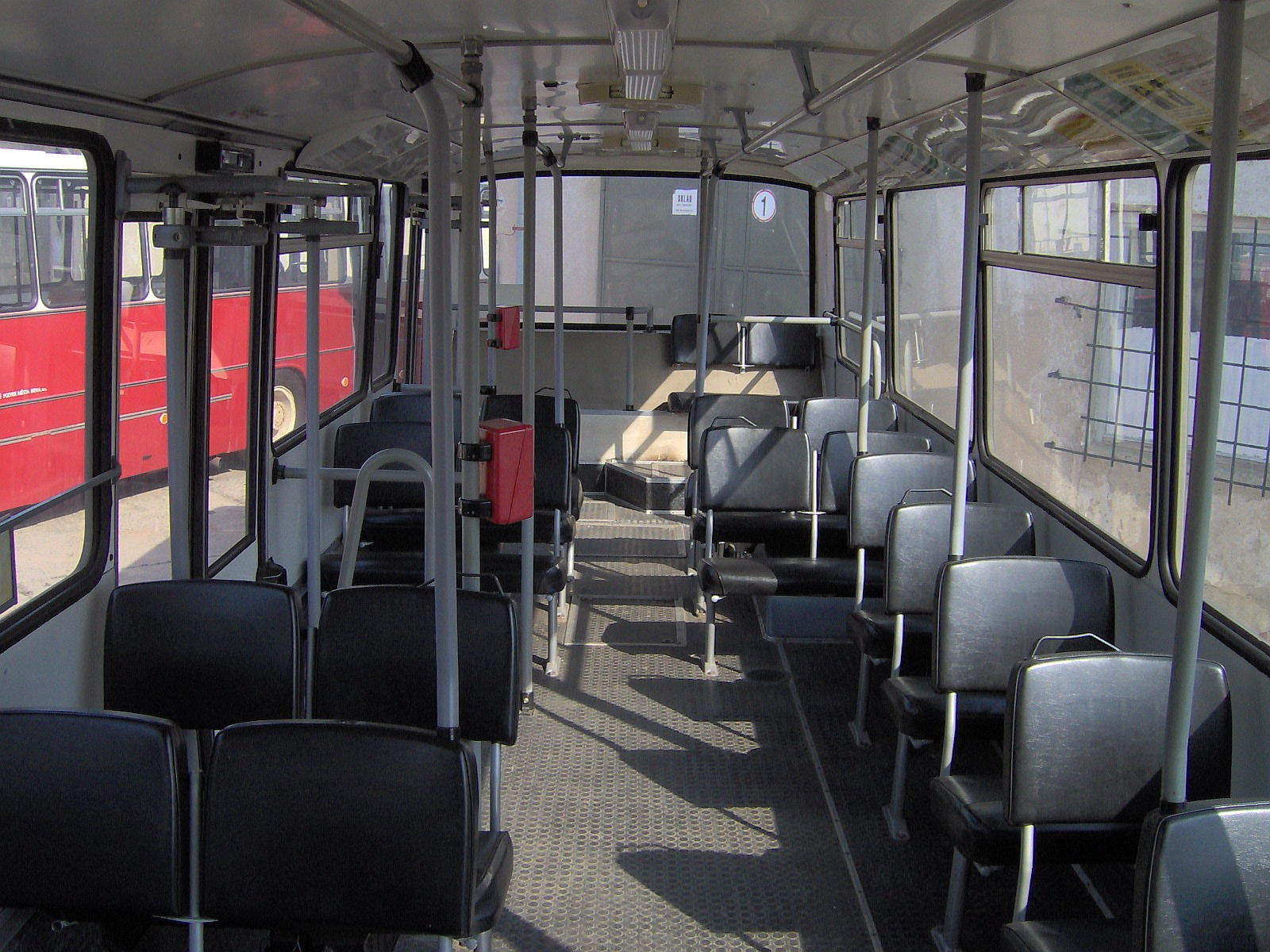
Interior of Karosa B 732 with black leatherette seats

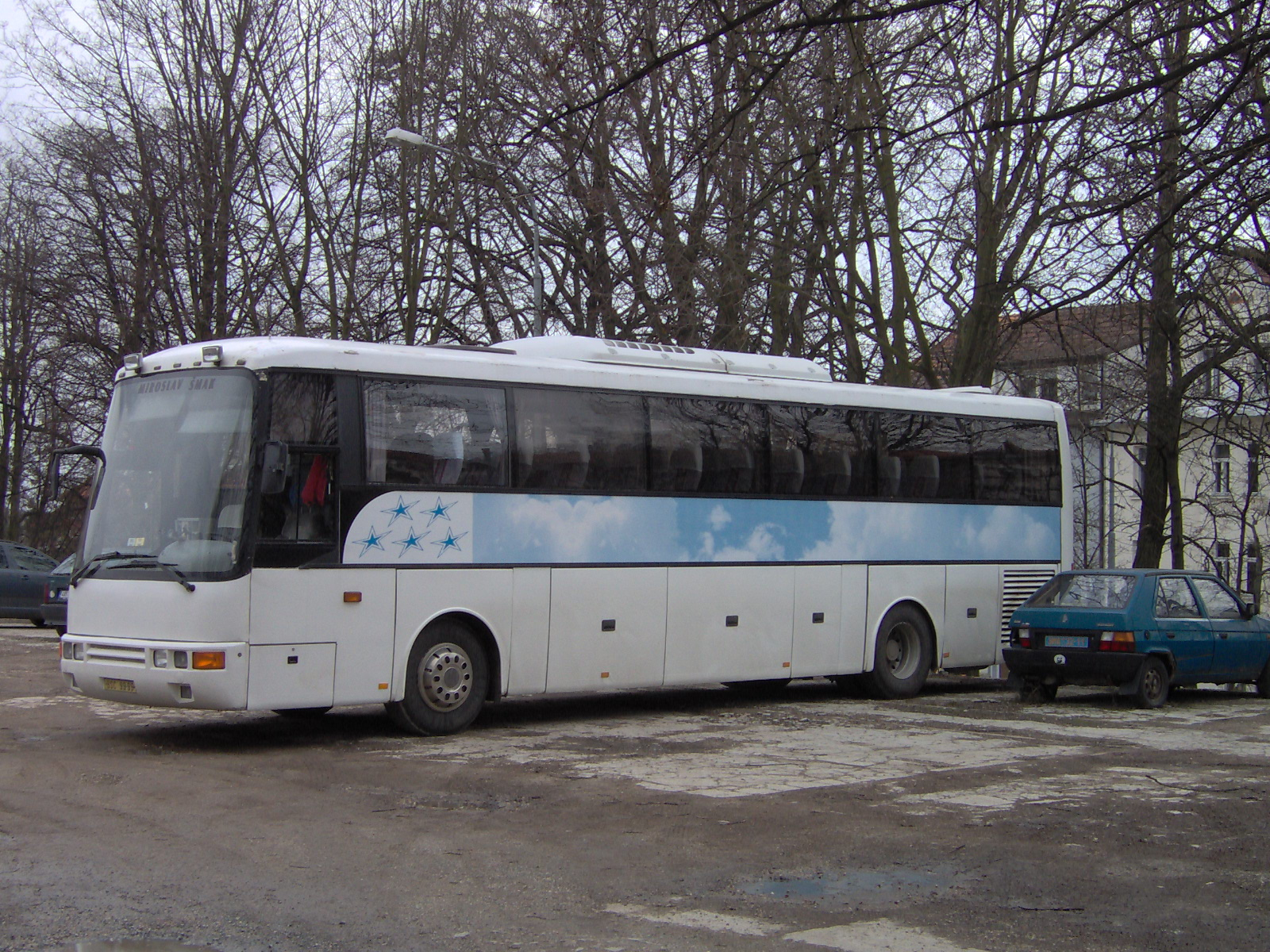
Karosa LC 757, modern long-distance coach produced between 1992 and 1996, based on 700 series

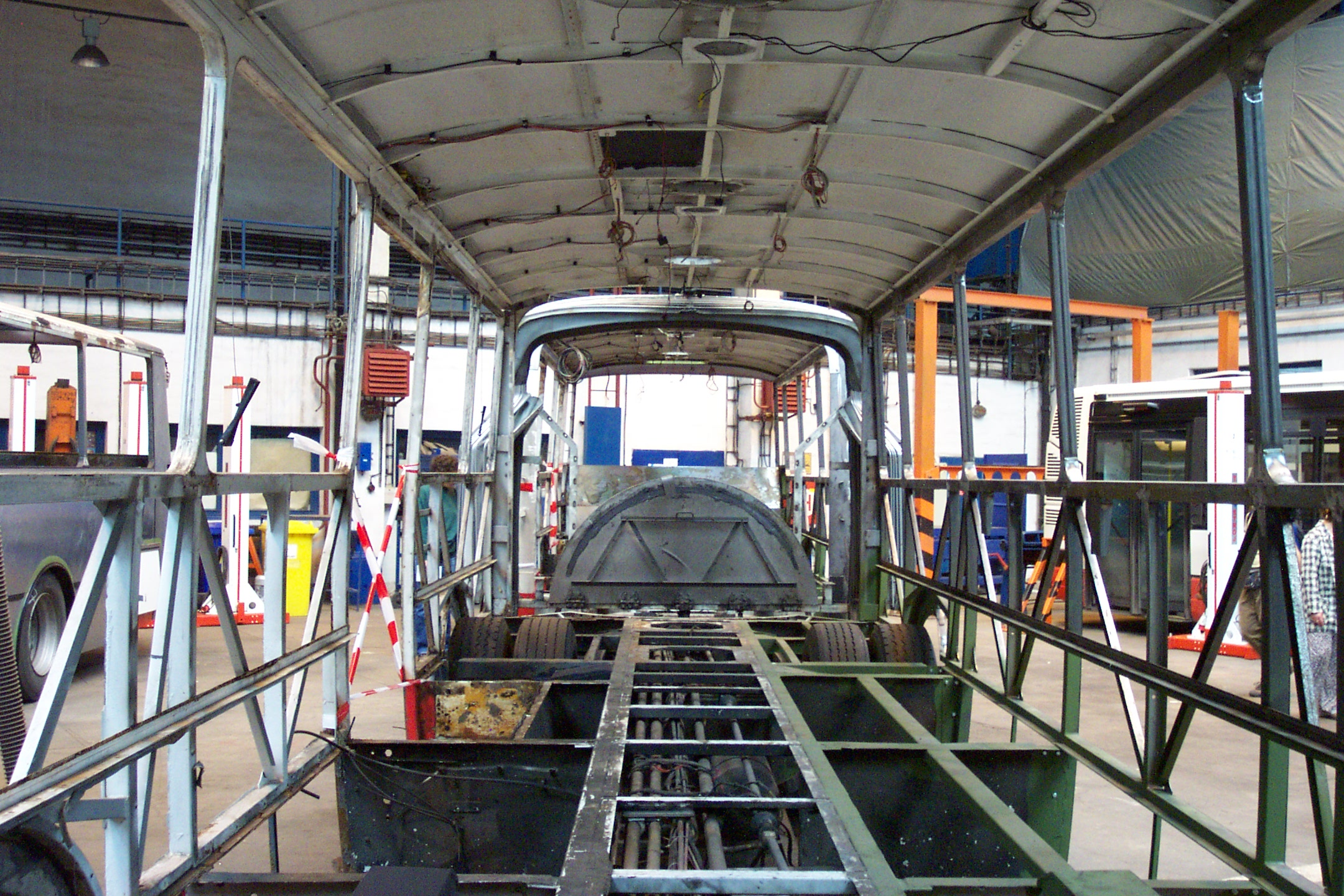
Semi-self-supporting body of Karosa B 741 with frame

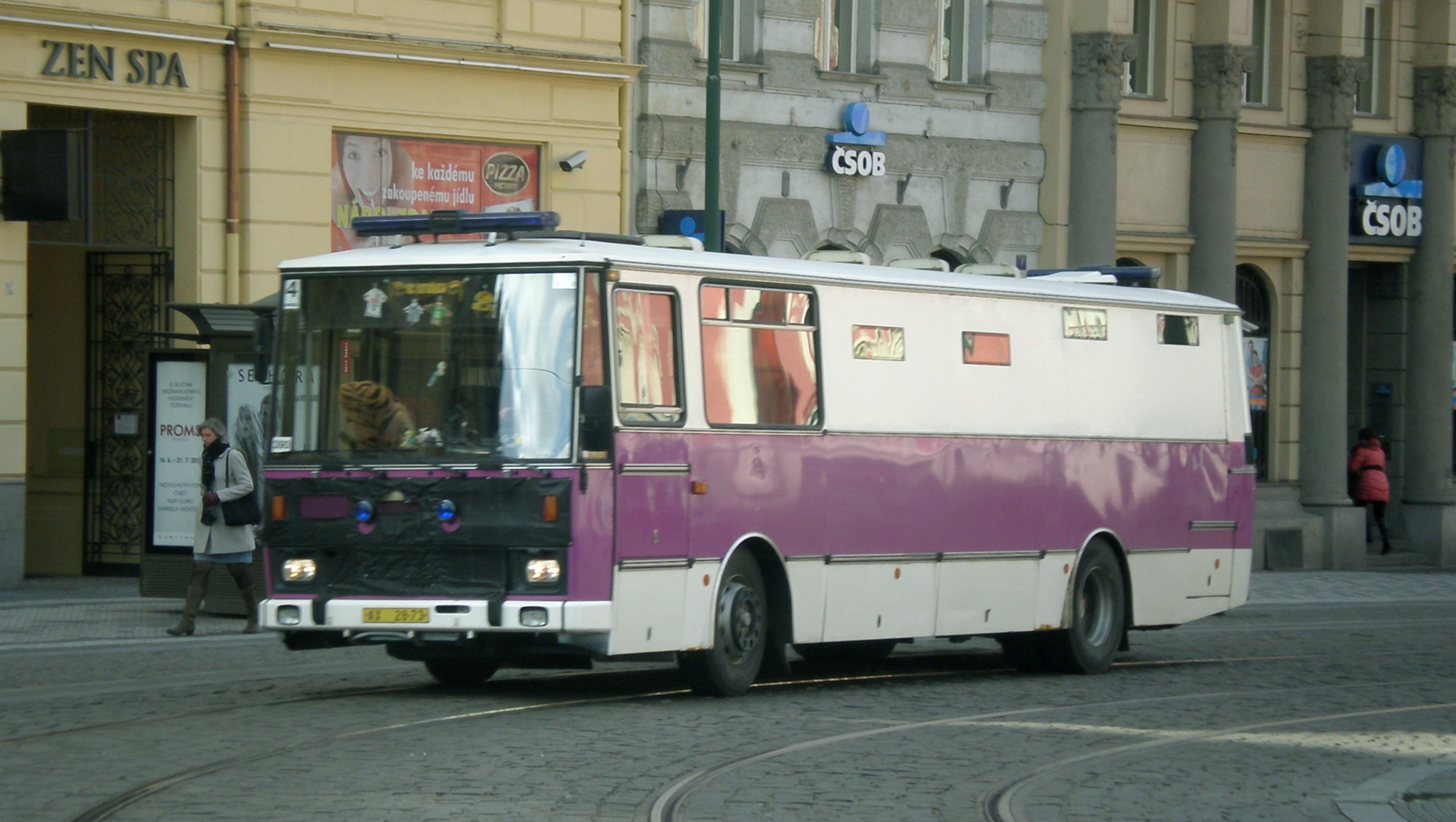
Karosa C 734 prison bus in Prague, Czech Republic

Karosa 700 series is a collective term for several modifications of buses made by Karosa company in Czechoslovakia, later Czech Republic, in the town of Vysoké Mýto between 1981 and 1997.

== History and variants ==
The first buses of the 700 series were produced during the 1970s. These were only functional samples and prototypes, which were designed for different tests (including comparisons with then produced Karosa Š series). The very first bus from the 700 series became functional sample of intercity bus Karosa C 733 in 1973.

Serial production of the 700 series began in 1981. The first (and main) representative was Karosa C 734 (intercity bus). This was followed by Karosa B 731 (city bus with automatic transmission), B 732 (suburban bus with manual gearbox), intercity bus C 735 and long-distance touring types LC 735 and LC 736. Also manufactured were articulated vehicles of the type C 744 (intercity) and B 741 (city). In the early 1990s, a coach with a raised floor was developed that was marked as Karosa LC 737 (as well as HD 11) and LC 757 (HD 12). In 1996 that was replaced with an upgraded 900 series and production of buses 700 series was finally completed a year later. A total of 37,166 buses of the 700 and 800 series were made.

In addition to Czechoslovakia, the buses were also sold in other markets. Probably most of them were exported to the Russia, where even a statue to Karosa C 734 was built in 2001. To Russia were exported buses known as 800 series, which were based on a 700 series.

== Designation ==
For new buses of Karosa 700 series, before number were one or two letters (as recommended by CMEA).

- Letter: car type - B (urban and suburban bus English 'b' us), C (and intercity bus line in English 'c' oach), LC (remote and coach, English 'l' ong distance 'c' oach)
- First figure: 7 - stands in the segment numbering (nomenclature engineering products) bus Karosa, however, there has been a shift in meaning and thus marked the first digit '7' 0s, when the bus was designed and constructed
- Second figure: the length of the bus - 3 = 11 m, 4 = 17 m, 12 m = 5
- Third digit:
  - Vehicles B "1" model B 731 originally marked the category B1 bus, later in the development of type B 732 marked the third digit type of gearbox (1 = automatic 2 = mechanical)
  - C vehicles: 3 = regional bus with an automatic transmission, 4 = intercity manual transmission, 5 = intercity with manual transmission and a larger luggage compartment (for longer lines or tours)
  - LC vehicles: numbers 5, 6 or 7 indicate the level of comfort (the higher the number, the more luxurious bus)
  - Doors: 1 door, 2 door or 3 doors (normal) or 2 doors, 3 doors or 4 doors (articulated)

== Construction ==
Like their predecessors, Š series, 700 series buses were built using prefabricated buildings. This technology consists in the production of six separate panels (frame, chassis, hips, body, roof, front and rear panel) to separate welding lines, which were then surface treated and assembled together. A significant change was the production of frames, hips and roof from industrially produced hollow. On the previous row with these parts were molded parts. This solution nowadays makes easier repairs after accidents. Compared to Karosa Š series, which had engine between the wheels, 700 series had engine and transmission stored behind the rear axle.

700 series was developed by engineers Ivan Mervart, Josef Nalezenec and Ladislav Klimeš and designed by Jan Tatoušek and Zdeněk Rosák.

== Special buses ==
Some buses of 700 series were adapted directly from the factory for special purposes. It is worth mentioning buses for transporting prisoners, measuring vehicle for 'Electric companies' or bus for the town library in Prague. For the production of these buses was responsible for first development workshop, later, since 1991, custom workshop. Some buses of 700 series have been produced for the customer special design.

== See also ==
- List of buses
