= Karosa B 741 =

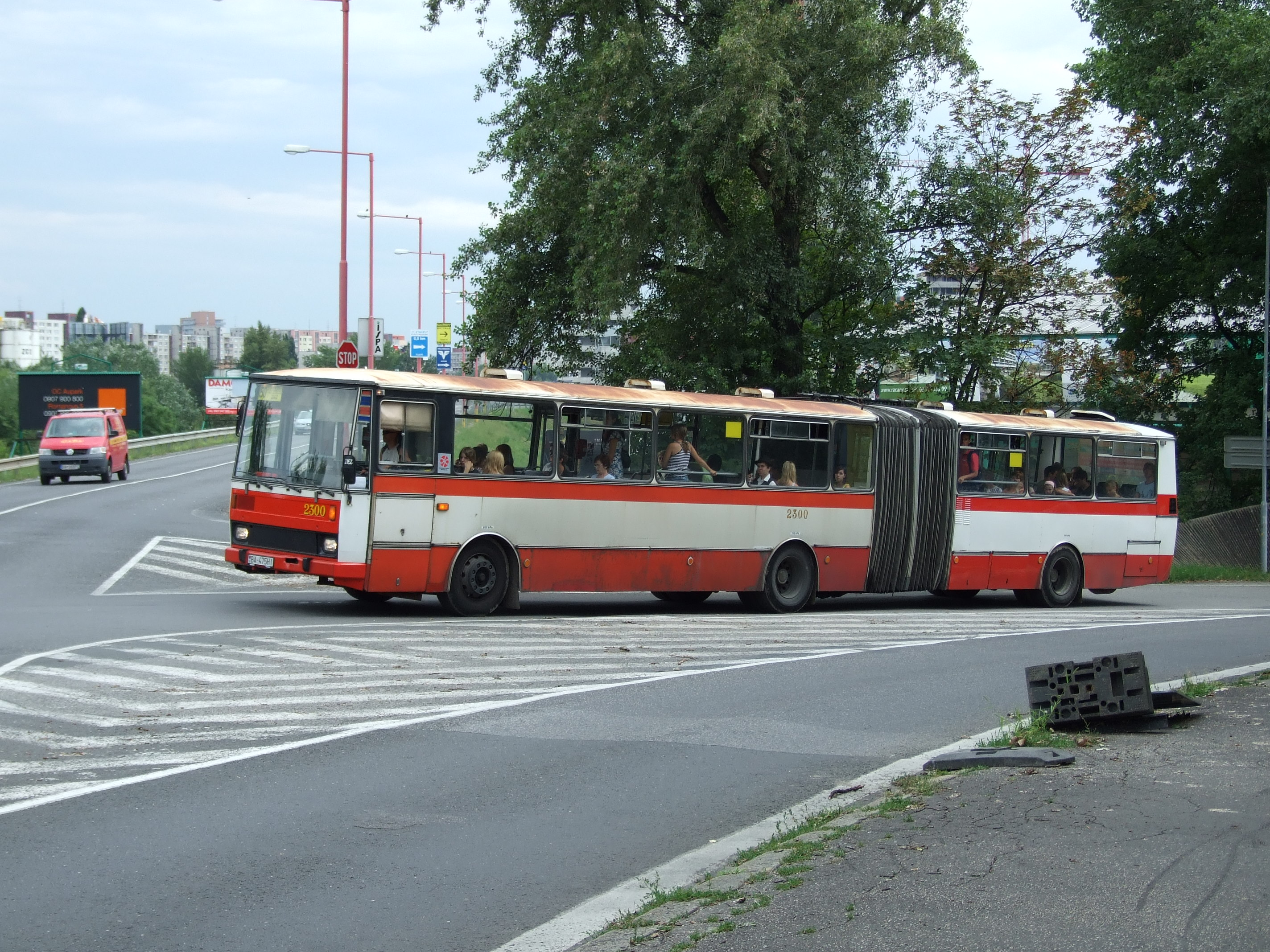
- Karosa B741 in Bratislava, Slovakia

Overview
- Manufacturer: Karosa

Body and chassis
- Doors: 4, air-operated
- Floor type: High-floor
- Chassis: semi-self-supporting with frame

Powertrain
- Engine: LIAZ ML637S V6 Diesel engine LIAZ ML636N Euro II V6 Diesel engine
- Capacity: 42 sitting 102 standing
- Power output: 190 kW (255 hp) (LIAZ ML637S); 175 kW (235 hp) (LIAZ ML636N)
- Transmission: Voith DIWA 3-speed automatic ZF 4-speed automatic

Dimensions
- Length: 17,355 mm (683.3 in)
- Width: 2,500 mm (98.4 in)
- Height: 3,165 mm (124.6 in)
- Curb weight: 13,700 kg (30,200 lb) (Euro 0); 14,200 kg (31,300 lb) (Euro 2)

Chronology
- Predecessor: Karosa ŠM 16,5
- Successor: Karosa B 941

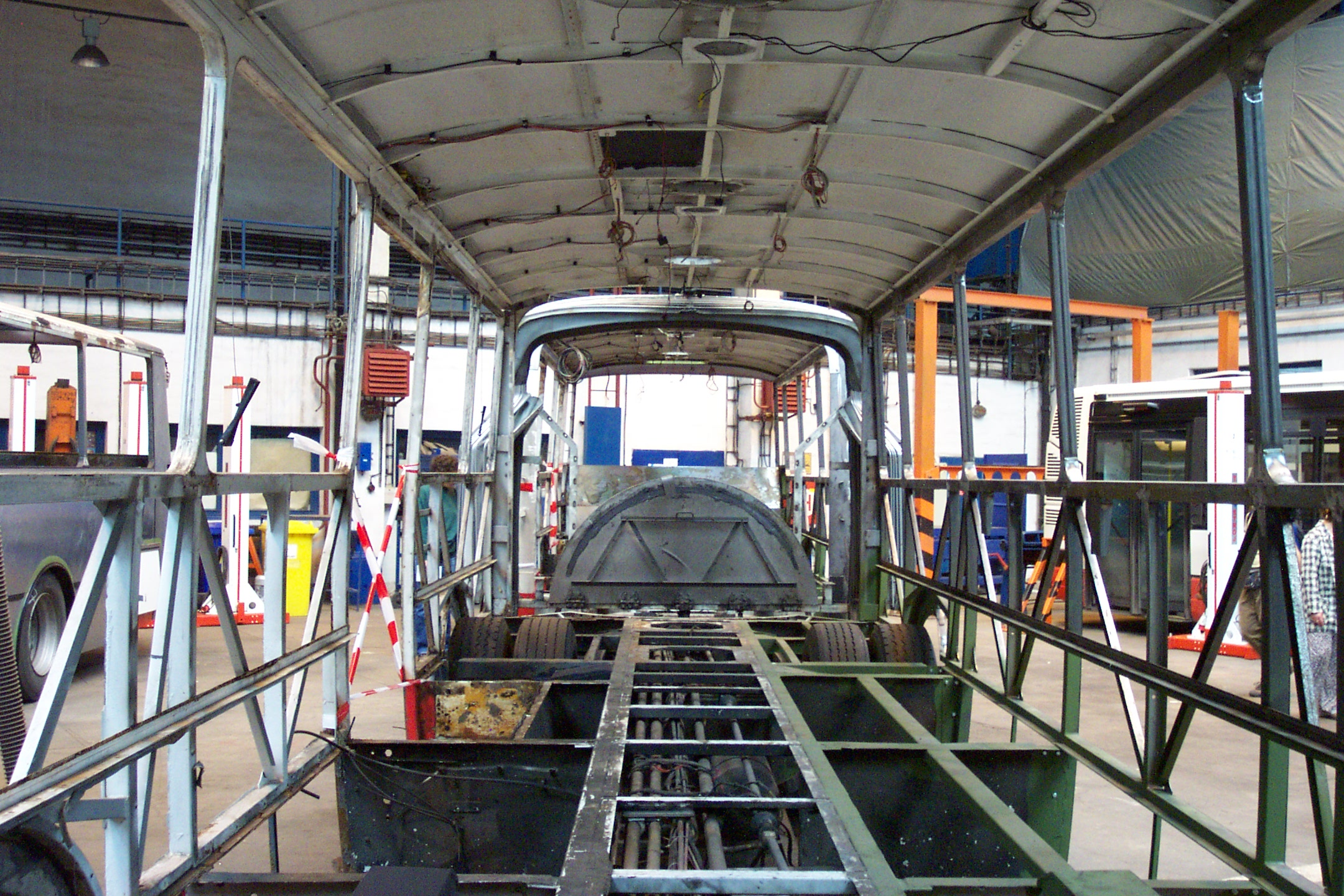
Semi-self-supporting body of Karosa B 741 with frame

Karosa B 741 is an articulated urban bus produced from 1991 to 1997 by bus manufacturer Karosa from the Czech Republic. In many towns they replaced Ikarus 280 made in Hungary. It was succeeded by Karosa B 941 in 1997.

== Construction features ==
Karosa B 741 is a model of the Karosa 700 series. The B 741 is derived from the Karosa C 744 articulated intercity bus, and also unified with city bus models such as the B 731 and the B 732. It is made of two rigid sections linked by a pivoting joint. The body is semi-self-supporting with frame and engine with automatic gearbox in the rear part. The engine drives only the third C axle, meaning that this articulated bus has a pusher configuration. The front axle is independent, middle and rear axles are solid. All axles are mounted on air suspension. On the right side are four doors (first and last are narrower than middle doors). Inside are used leatherette seats, plastic Vogelsitze or Fainsa seats. The driver's cab is separated from the rest of the vehicle by a glazed partition. In the middle part and in the rear part is room for a pram or wheelchair. Original buses produced until 1995 had an open design of turntable, buses delivered in 1996 already have an enclosed design of the turntable as a successor Karosa B 941.

== Production and operation ==
Prototype of Karosa B741 was done by rebuilding Karosa C 744 in 1991. Serial production started by the end of 1991 and continued until 1997. Largest operator was Prague transport company (174 buses) and Bratislava transport company (104 buses). Between 1991 and 1997, as many as 620 of these buses were produced. These buses were operated also in other Czech cities, like Brno, Ostrava, Olomouc, Zlín, or in Slovakian cities like Košice or Nitra.
Some buses were also operated in Poland, Lithuania and Russia

Currently, number of Karosa B741 buses is reduced, due to supply of new low-floor buses, for example by SOR NB 18 made in Czech Republic and Irisbus Citelis 18m made in France, Italy and Czech Republic.

Karosa B 741 operated in Prague were retired on 6 June 2015. The last city that Karosas were on service was Bratislava, they were retired in 2021.

== See also ==
- List of buses
- (in Slovak) Článek o autobusech B 741 v Bratislavě
- (in Czech) Fotogalerie autobusů B 741 v Praze
- (in Czech) Rozsáhlá fotogalerie vozů Karosa B 741 v Brně
