= LIAZ =

LIAZ may refer to:

- LIAZ (Czech Republic), a defunct Czech and Czechoslovak manufacturer of trucks
- LiAZ (Russia), a bus manufacturing company in Russia
