= Škoda 706 RTO =

Urban bus produced by bus manufacturers Karosa and Škoda

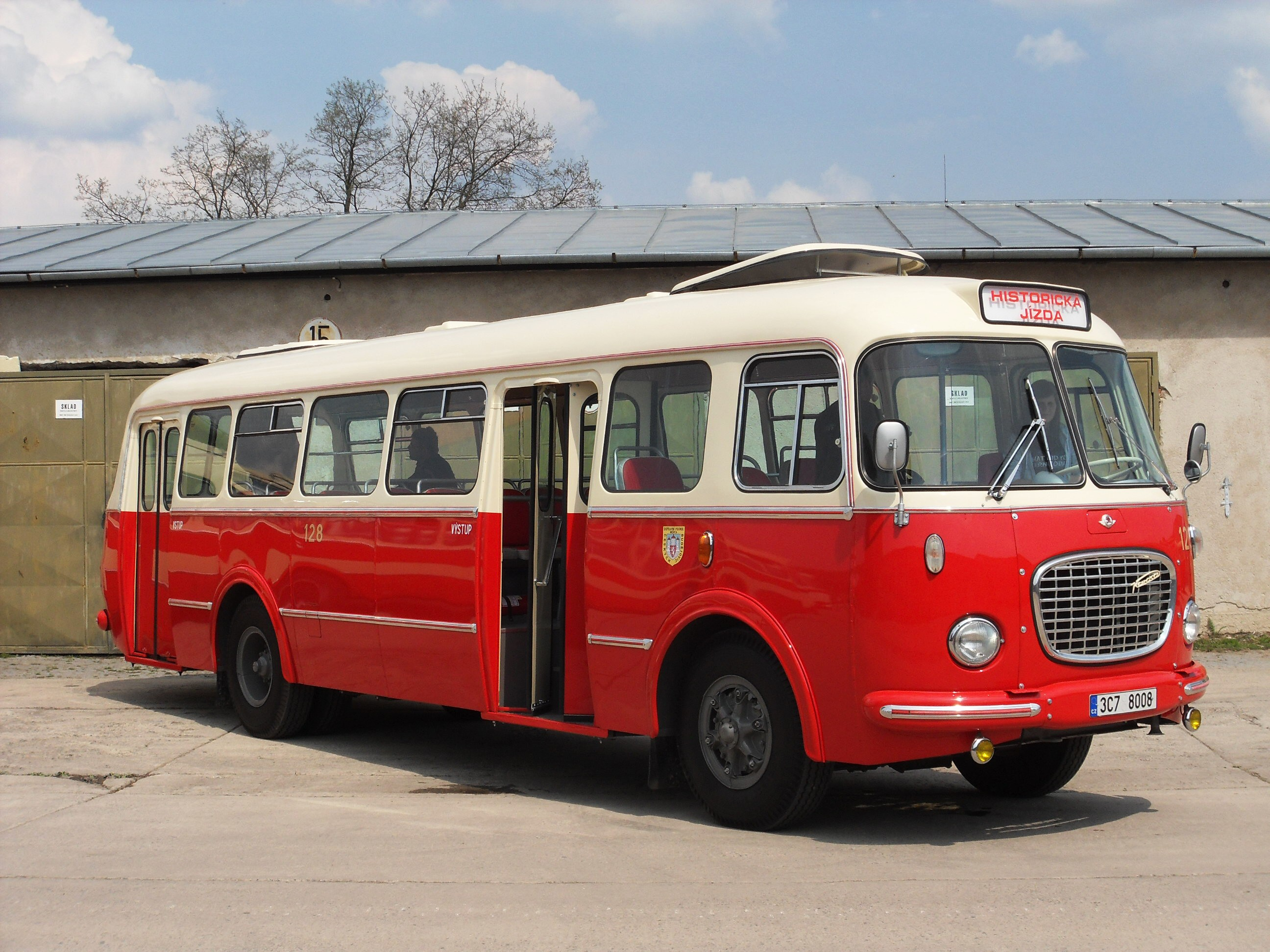
- Historical Škoda 706 RTO in Brno, Czech Republic

Overview
- Manufacturer: Karosa, Škoda

Body and chassis
- Doors: 2, air-operated
- Floor type: High-floor
- Chassis: Body on frame

Powertrain
- Engine: Škoda 706
- Transmission: 5-speed manual

Dimensions
- Length: 10 720 mm
- Width: 2500 mm
- Height: 3150 mm
- Curb weight: 8570–8950 kg

Chronology
- Predecessor: Škoda 706 RO
- Successor: Karosa ŠM 11

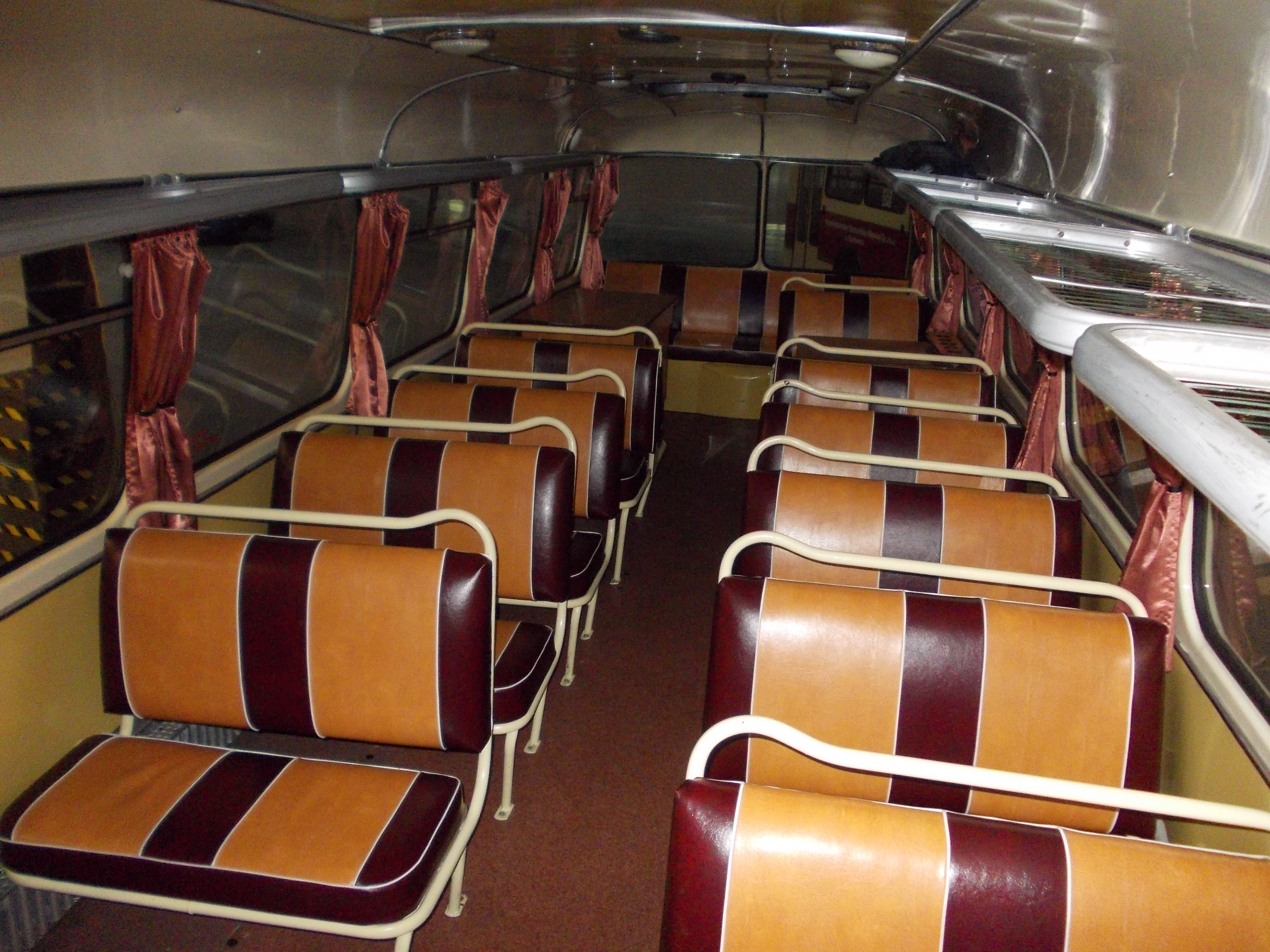
interior of Škoda 706 RTO

Škoda 706 RTO is an urban bus produced by bus manufacturer Karosa and Škoda in Czechoslovakia between 1958 and 1972. It was succeeded by Karosa ŠM 11 in 1964.

== Construction features ==
706 RTO was built on frame of Škoda 706 trucks. The engine was placed in the front next to driver, and rear axle was propelled by long driveshaft. On the right side were two doors. The interior was furnished with leatherette seats.

== Production and operation ==
Serial production of the Škoda 706 RTO began in 1958, and continued until 1972.

From 1959 to 1986 the bus was also produced under licence in Poland by Jelcz factory as Jelcz 043 (nicknamed ″cucumber″, pol. ″ogórek″).

Škoda 706 RTO is no longer operated by any public transport authorities, but many of them are operated as historical vehicles. The last Škoda 706 RTO used in public transport in Prague was retired in 1978.

Outside Czechoslovakia, Škoda 706 RTO were also exported to other socialist countries such as China and North Korea. It was one of the prominent bus models in Beijing. There is also one Škoda 706 RTO preserved in Pyongyang, together with another Škoda 706 RO. Both buses have been ridden by Kim Il-sung. There were other buses on the same chassis like the Chavdar M80/M81.

== Historical vehicles ==
As many Škoda 706 RTO buses still exist, the following list is not complete. Czech Republic

- ČSAP Nymburk (1xLUX, 1xKAR, 1×modified convertible, 1×passenger trailer Karosa NO 80)
- ČSAD buses Plzeň (2×KAR)
- Transport Company of the České Budějovice (bus no. 128 version MTZ)
- Transport Company towns Most and Litvínov (bus reg. No. 150 version MEX)
- DP Ostrava (bus reg. No. 247 KAR version)
- DP Pardubice (bus reg. No. 28 version MTZ)
- Nová Bystřice (perhaps it still run on regular routes JH Bus Ltd.)
- DS Zlín - Otrokovice (bus reg. No. 2 version MTZ, SPZ 3Z6 6930, year 1959)
- Technical Museum in Brno (bus reg. No. 202 version MTZ, year 1966)
- Plzeň Transport Company (bus reg. No. 51 version MTZ)
- Busline (1 × 53-84 LIA MTZ license plates, license plate KAR 3L3 8000, year 1964)
- Transport company of Karlovy Vary (1 × LUX, SPZ SOA 13–88, year 1961)
- TS Příbram (1 × KAR, SPZ PB 34–40)
- BBG Eberswalde (1 × KAR, SPZ BAR B109H, year 1963)
- Bus Jihotrans (1 × LUX, SPZ CBA 19–49, year 1965)
- Tourbus (1xLUX, SPZ BSC 74–95, year 1969)
- PROBO BUS (1×LUX, license plate 11V 2499, year 1968)
- ZDAR (1 × KAR)
- P-transport (1×KAR, license plate NAA 55–33, year 1964)
- Magic Bus (LUX, license plate 14V 0142)

Slovakia:

- DP Bratislava (bus reg. No. 236 version MTZ)
- SAD Trnava (1 × LUX, SPZ TT-H040)
- ŠKODA - BUS club Plzeň (version LUX year 1961 version TRST, mobile transfusion station, year 1964)
- Nitra (LUX version, the car is garaged in the Slovak Agricultural Museum, belonging to private individuals)
- ANVI TRADE s.r.o. (version LUX)

== See also ==
- List of buses
