= Karosa C 734 =

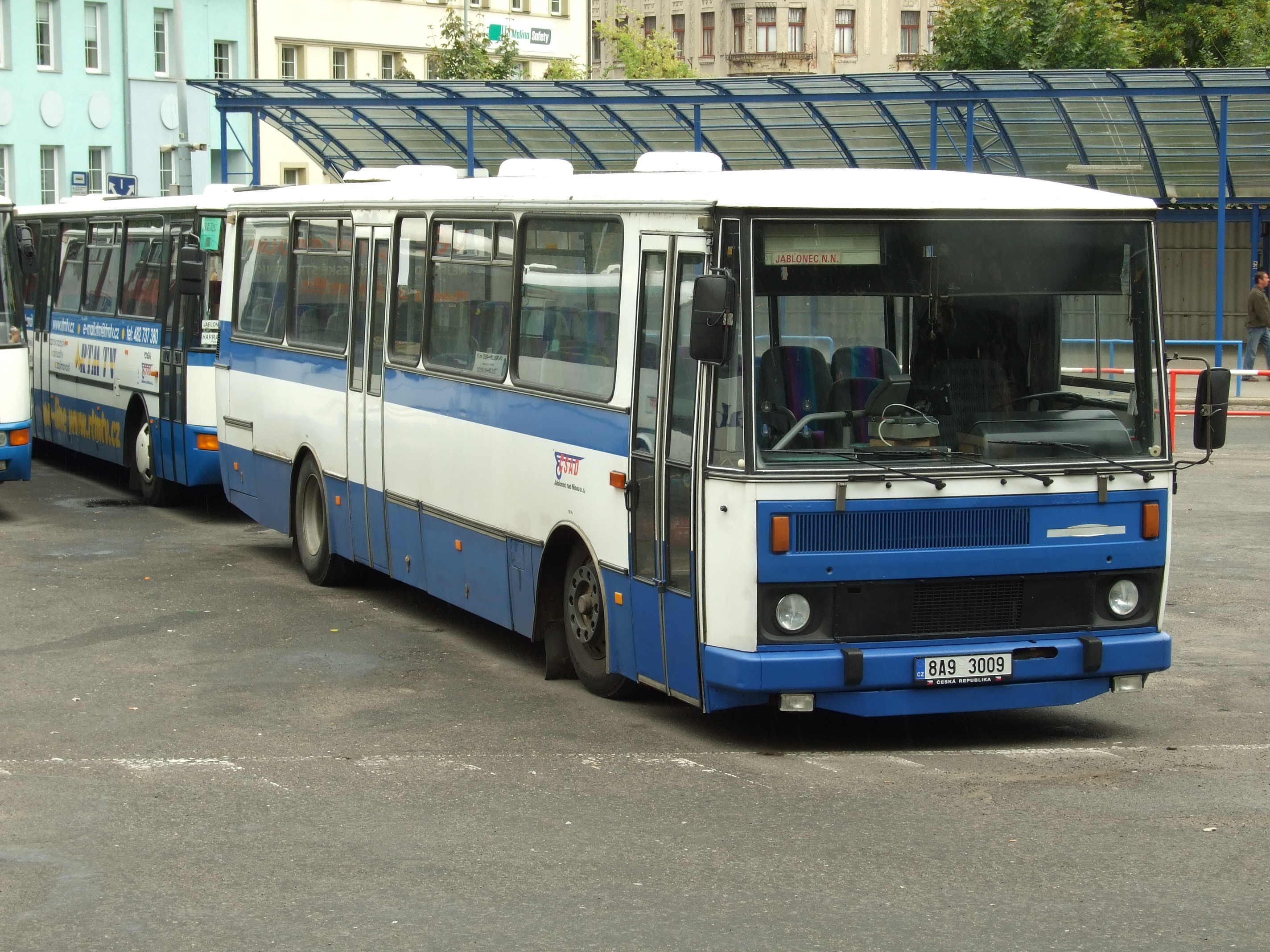
- Karosa C 734 in Jablonec nad Nisou, Czech Republic

Overview
- Manufacturer: Karosa

Body and chassis
- Doors: 2, air-operated
- Floor type: High-floor
- Chassis: semi-self-supporting with frame

Powertrain
- Engine: LIAZ ML 635 horizontal straight 6 Diesel engine LIAZ ML 636 N horizontal straight 6 Diesel engine
- Power output: 148 kW (198 hp) (LIAZ ML 635); 155 kW (208 hp) (LIAZ ML 636 N)
- Transmission: Praga 5-speed manual

Dimensions
- Length: 11,055 mm (435.2 in)
- Width: 2,500 mm (98.4 in)
- Height: 3,165 mm (124.6 in)
- Curb weight: 9,500 kg (20,900 lb)-10,050 kg (22,160 lb)

Chronology
- Predecessor: Karosa ŠL 11
- Successor: Karosa C 934

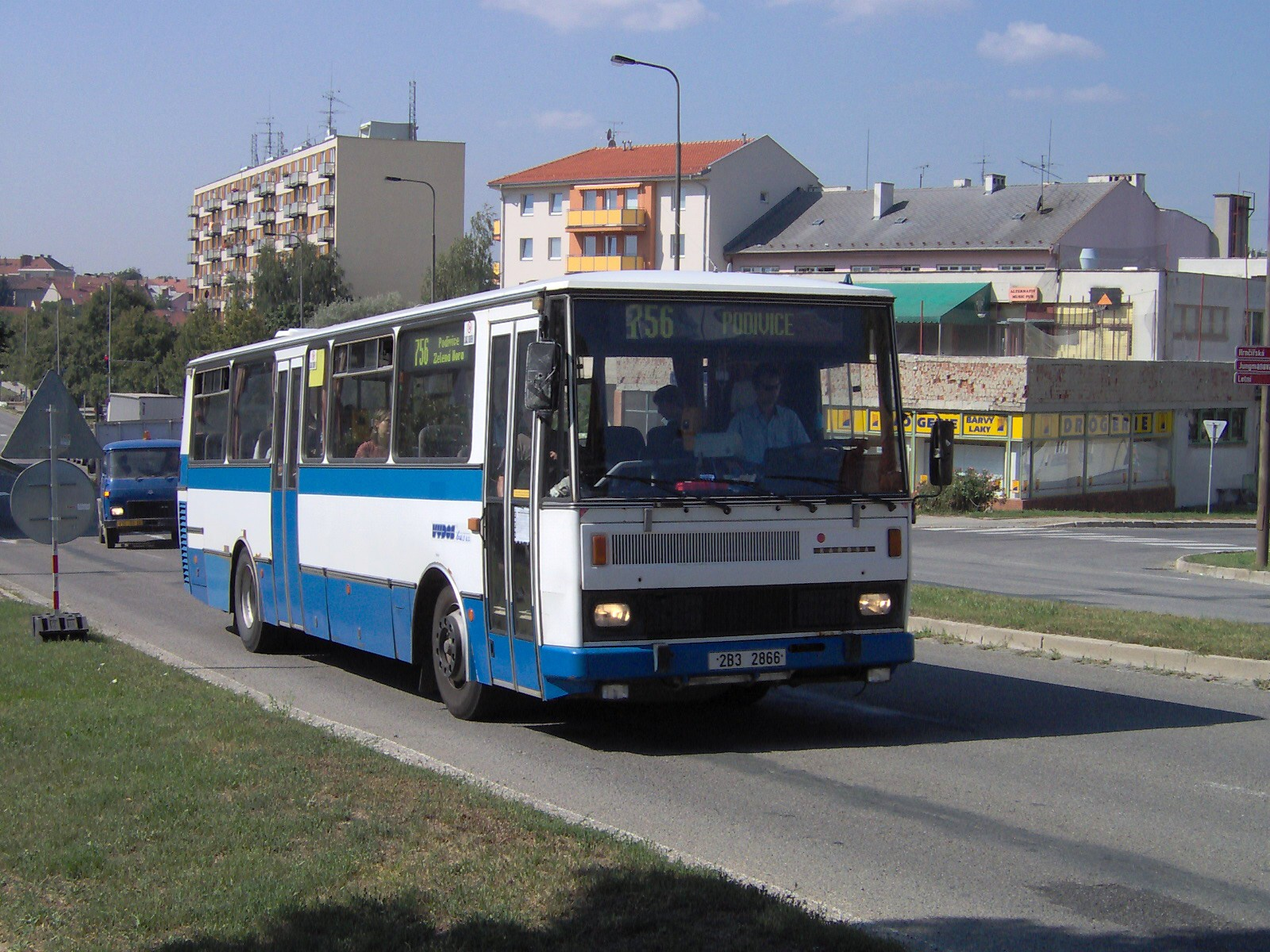
Karosa C 734 on line 756 to Podivice in Vyškov at Olomouc street (Czech: Olomoucká ulice) in Czech Republic

Karosa C 734 is an intercity bus produced from 1981 to 1996 by bus manufacturer Karosa from the Czech Republic. It was succeeded by Karosa C 934 in 1996.

== Construction features ==
The Karosa C 734 is the basic model of Karosa 700 series. C 734 is built on a common frame and body with the city bus models B 731 and B 741. The body is semi-self-supporting with frame and engine with manual gearbox is in the rear. Only the rear axle is powered. The front axle is independent and the rear axle is solid. All axles are mounted on air suspension. On the right side are two doors. Between the axles underneath the bodywork is a luggage compartment with a volume of 3.5 m³. Hot water heating is provided, and is efficient at temperatures lower than 0 °C, however, the problem of the whole bus is controlling the flow of heat. Difficulties in ventilation and cooling are experienced during high exterior temperatures, since the only ventilation is two small sliding windows on the right side and three on the left. Forced ventilation from two heating system fans can not effectively exchange air. Seats for the passengers are spaced as 2 + 2 with a central aisle. The driver's cab is not separated from the rest of the vehicle. C 734 (like other variants of the 700 series) had undergone many modifications during production, which should ensure better serviceability of these buses (especially newer, more powerful engines).

== Production and operation ==
Serial production started in 1981, and continued until 1996.

Currently, the number of Karosa C734 buses in service is decreasing, due to advanced age of buses.

== Chollima-973 ==
A number of Karosa C734 were converted into trolleybuses by the Pyongyang Trolley Bus Factory in the 90s with the conversion finishing in 1997. These trolleybuses are the second most common vehicle in Pyongyang's trolleybus systems behind the newer articulated Chollima-091. They also serve in Pyongsong. Since then, some vehicles have been converted into work cars by adding a platform on the roof.

== Historical vehicles ==
- Private collector in Prague (1 bus, ex Czech army, year 1982)
- Private collector in Otvovice (1 bus, ex Lamer, year 1990)
- Probo trans Beroun (1 bus, year 1982)

== See also ==
- List of buses
