= Karosa B 832 =

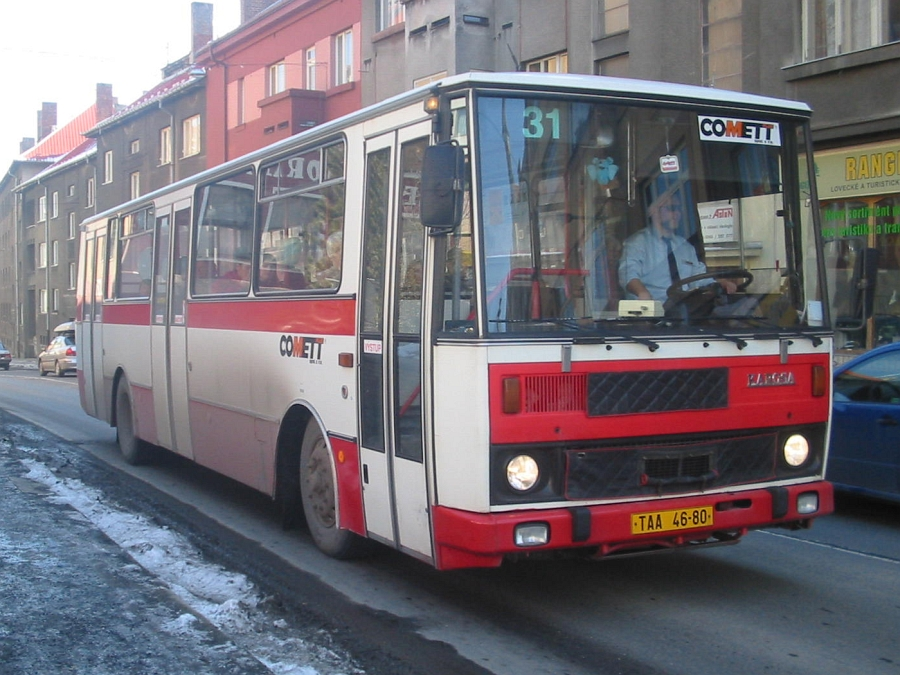
- Karosa B 832 in Tábor

Overview
- Manufacturer: Karosa

Body and chassis
- Doors: 3, air-operated
- Floor type: High-floor
- Chassis: semi-self-supporting with frame

Powertrain
- Engine: LIAZ ML 636 N V6 Diesel engine
- Power output: 175 kW (235 hp) (LIAZ ML 636 N)
- Transmission: Praga 5-speed manual

Dimensions
- Length: 11,055 mm (435.2 in)
- Width: 2,500 mm (98.4 in)
- Height: 3,165 mm (124.6 in)
- Curb weight: 9,500 kg (20,900 lb)

Chronology
- Predecessor: Karosa B 732
- Successor: Karosa B 932

Karosa B 832 is an urban bus produced from 1997 to 1999 by bus manufacturer Karosa from the Czech Republic, intended for the market of the post-Soviet republics. It was succeeded by Karosa B 932 .

== Construction features ==
Karosa B 832 is a model of the Karosa 800 series. The B 832 is very similar to its predecessor, the Karosa B 732 city bus, and also unified with its articulated counterpart, the Karosa B 841 and its intercity counterpart, the Karosa C 834. The body is semi-self-supporting with frame. The engine and the manual gearbox is located in the rear, which can be accessed from the outside by a door under the rear window. The engine powers only the rear axle, which is solid. The front axle is independent, and both axles are mounted on an Air suspension. On the right side are three pneumatically operated doors, of which the front doors are narrower than the other two. In the interior, either leatherette, plastic Vogelsitze or Fainsa seats are used. The driver's cab is separated from the rest of the vehicle by a glazed partition. In the middle or rear of the passenger compartment is room for one stroller or a wheelchair.

== Production and operation ==
Because many former Soviet states had issues with approval of the new Karosa 900 series, Karosa decided to continue with the production of modified 700 series buses for these countries, which have received a new designation – 800 series, which was reused from a planned series of buses in the 1980s, several prototypes of which were made. 800 series buses were manufactured since 1997, after the production of the 700 series was finished, until 1999, when it was replaced by the 900 series. In total, 102 buses were produced. B 832 buses were intended primarily for export to the countries of the former Soviet Union. A few units ended up in cities of the Czech Republic and Slovakia due to the buyers in the former USSR entering bankruptcies, which would find use as new buses or as replacement bodies for the older buses of the 700 series, many of which were nearly 20 years old by the late 1990s.

== Historical vehicles ==
- MHDT Kladno (Karosa B832.1654, ex COMETT PLUS)

== See also ==
- List of buses
