= Karosa B 40 =

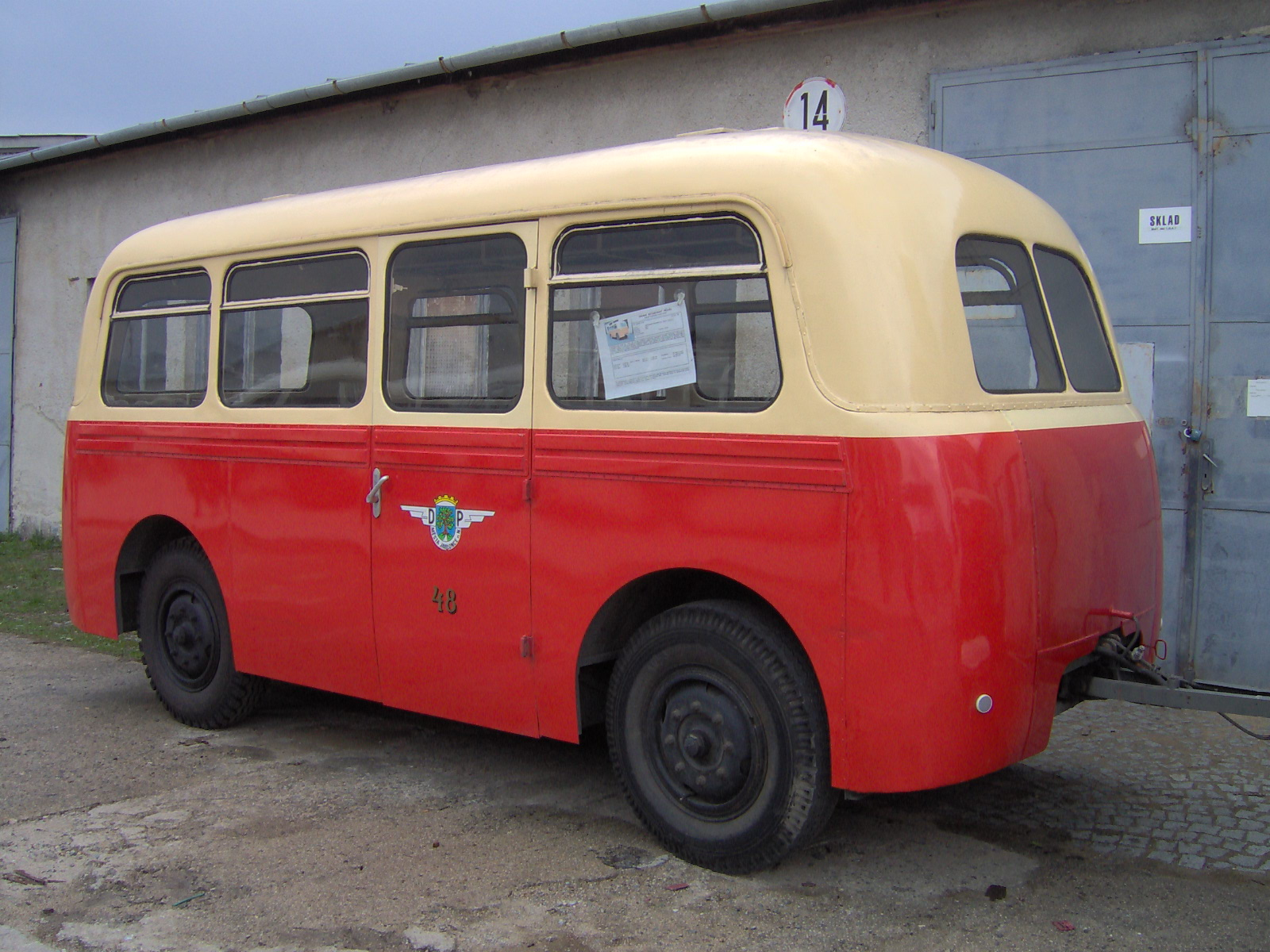
Bus trailer B 40

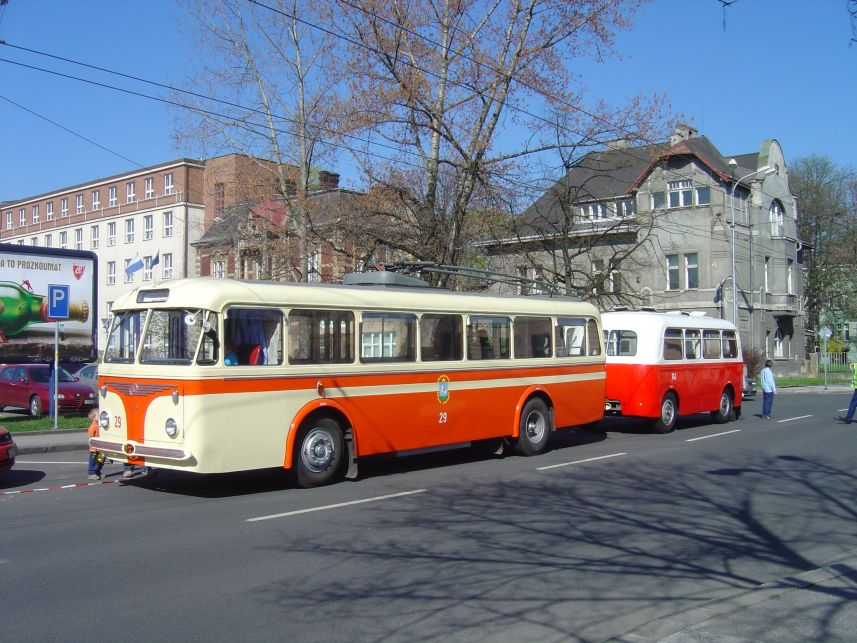
Trailer B 40 coupled behind trolleybus Škoda 8 Tr

Karosa B 40 is a model bus trailer, which was produced in the 1950s and 1960s in Karosa Vysoké Mýto and then in Letňanské strojírny in Prague.

== Design ==
Karosa B 40 is two-axle bus trailer (trailer). Trailers had semi self-supporting body based on the "mountain buses" Tatra 500 HB, which Karosa also produced. Conceptually was B 40 based on the trailer Karosa D 4, which was produced at the turn of the 1940s to 1950s. B 40 had a metal body of steel-voltage extruded profiles, which were electrically welded to each other. The exterior of the trailer was flashing, the interior was lined with wood-fiber plates. The axle beams were hung on the bottom shelf of the body. The front axle was manageable. Passenger seats were distributed differently. trailers made in Karosa had longitudinal bench seat with one cross on each forehead trailer. Trailers from Letňanské strojírny (B were identified as 40 A) had the seat positioned transversely. Loading and unloading was done by one manually operated, so-called percussion doors on the right side panel.

== Specifications ==
- Length: 5820 mm
- Width: 2350 mm
- Height: 2805 mm
- Empty carriage weight: 2950 kg
- Total Seats: 40 (Karosa) / 39 (Letňanské strojírny)
  - Seating: 23/26
  - Standing: 17/13

== Production and operation ==
Towing cars type B 40 were produced in the Vysoké Mýto in years 1953 to 1957, according to other sources until 1959. Moving production to Letňany was apparently carried out in connection with the start of serial production of buses Škoda 706 RTO in Karosa. Letňanské strojírny then continued in a production of trailer B 40 until 1962. Bus trailers B 40 has been widely used on routes of Czechoslovak state automobile transport in industrial areas that were drying off for buses in peak working days. Trailers are also applied in urban transport, although in smaller quantities. In some cities (Ostrava, Pardubice, Plzeň and Zlín) were even on the busiest routes coupled with trolleybuses. In normal operation, trailers B 40 maintained until the 1970s.

== Historical vehicles ==
- Brno (in the collection Technical Museum in Brno (one trailer from Jablonec reg. No. 48)
- Ostrava (reg. No. 141 of Transport Company Ostrava)
- Vysoké Mýto (before the renovation, the Regional Museum)
- Zlín (Transportation Company Zlín-Otrokovice)

Private collections:

- ŠKODA-BUS club Plzeň - Museum of Transportation Strašice (before renovation)
- Pardubice Guild history of rail transport (in the renovation, originally from bus Pelhřimov)

== See also ==
- List of buses
