= Karosa B 952 =

Czech bus

Karosa B952
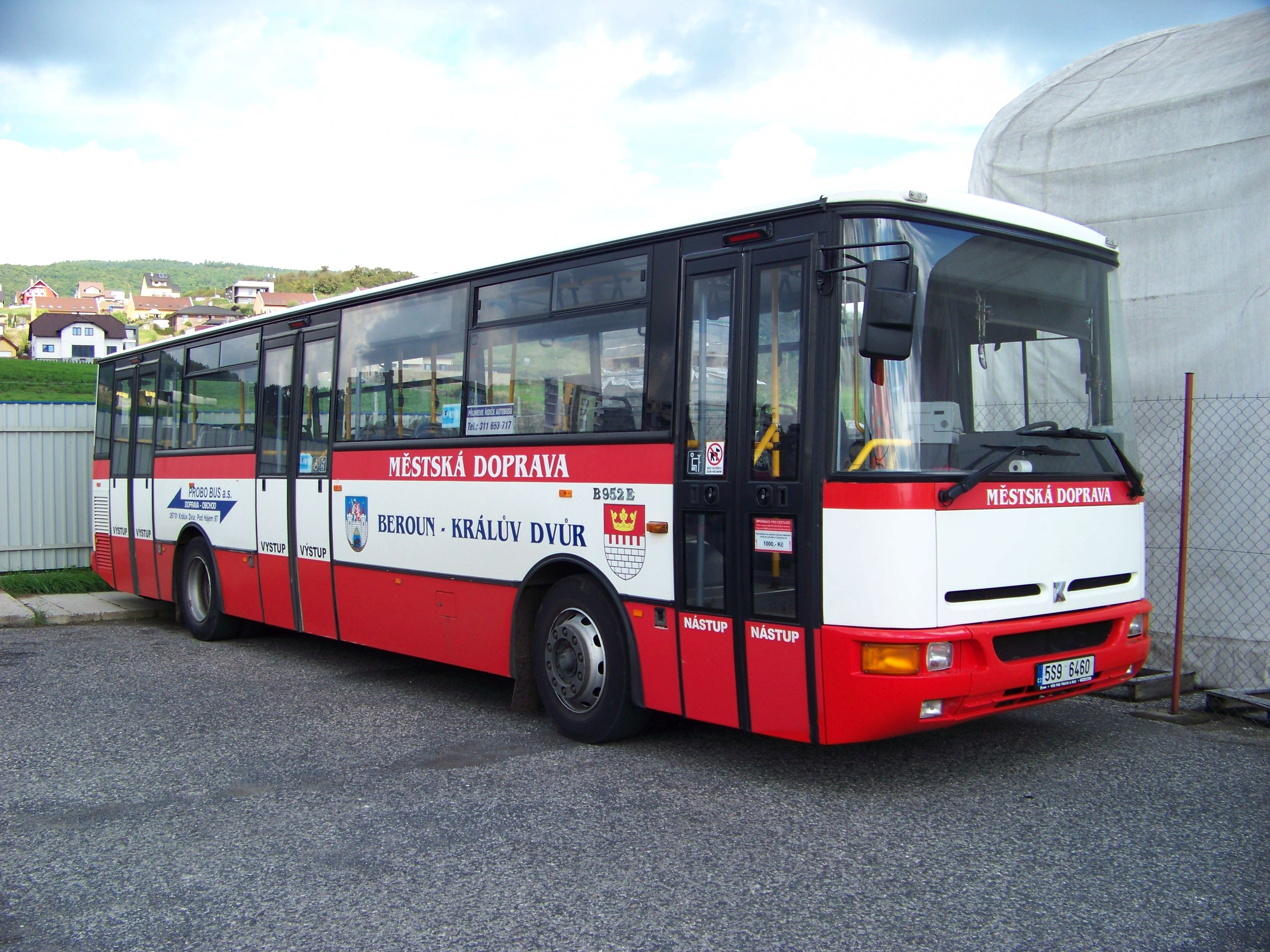
- Karosa B952 in Beroun, Czech Republic

Overview
- Manufacturer: Karosa

Body and chassis
- Doors: 3, air-operated
- Floor type: High-floor
- Chassis: semi-self-supporting with frame

Powertrain
- Engine: Iveco Cursor 8 Euro III
- Capacity: 31 sitting/68 standing
- Power output: 210 kW
- Transmission: Praga 5-speed manual ZF 6-speed manual

Dimensions
- Length: 11320 mm
- Width: 2500 mm
- Height: 3165 mm
- Curb weight: 9820kg - 10500 kg

Chronology
- Predecessor: Karosa B 932
- Successor: Irisbus Citelis

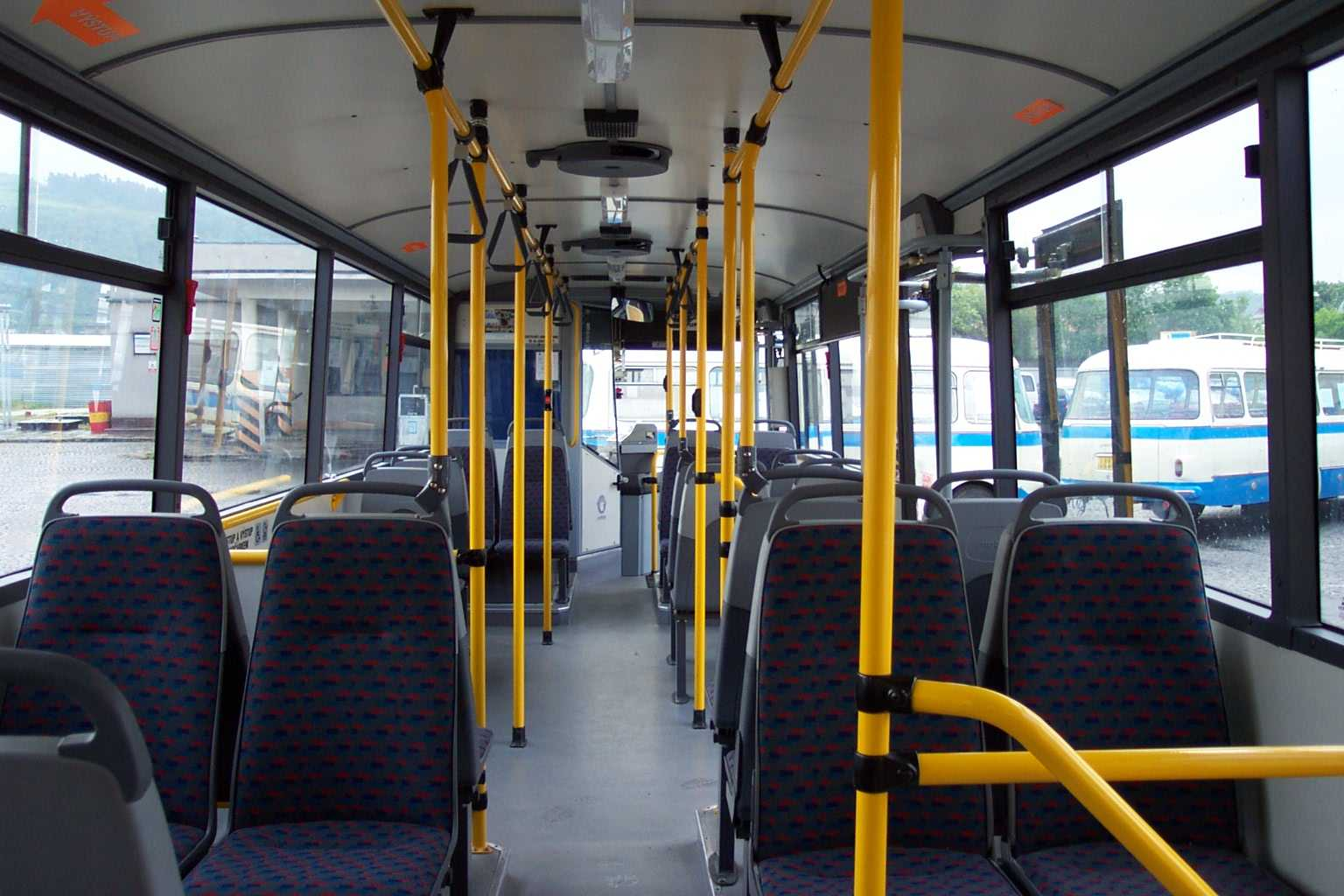
Interior of Karosa B952E

Karosa B 952 is an urban bus produced from 2002 to 2006 by bus manufacturer Karosa from the Czech Republic. A modernised version, B952E, was introduced in 2003.

== Construction features ==
Karosa B 952 is a model of the Karosa 900 series. The B 952 is unified with city bus models such as the B 951 and the B 961. The body was assembled to the skeleton, which has undergone a dip stage, sheets were galvanized and painted and then to have it installed additional components. The body is semi-self-supporting with frame and engine with manual gearbox is placed in the rear part. The engine drives only the rear axle. The front and rear axles are solid. All the axles are mounted on air suspension. On the right side are three doors (first are narrower than middle doors). Inside are used plastic Vogelsitze or Ster seats. The driver's cab is separated from the rest of the vehicle by a glazed partition. In the middle part is room for a pram or wheelchair.

== Production and operation ==
Serial production started in 2002 and lasted until 2006. Since 2003 only modernized version, Karosa B 951 E was produced, which had glass glued to skeleton, instead of glass mounted in rubber and with a better ventilation of the engine compartment.

== Historical vehicles ==
Any historical vehicle was not saved yet.

== See also ==
- List of buses
