= Sodomka =

Czech coachbuilding company

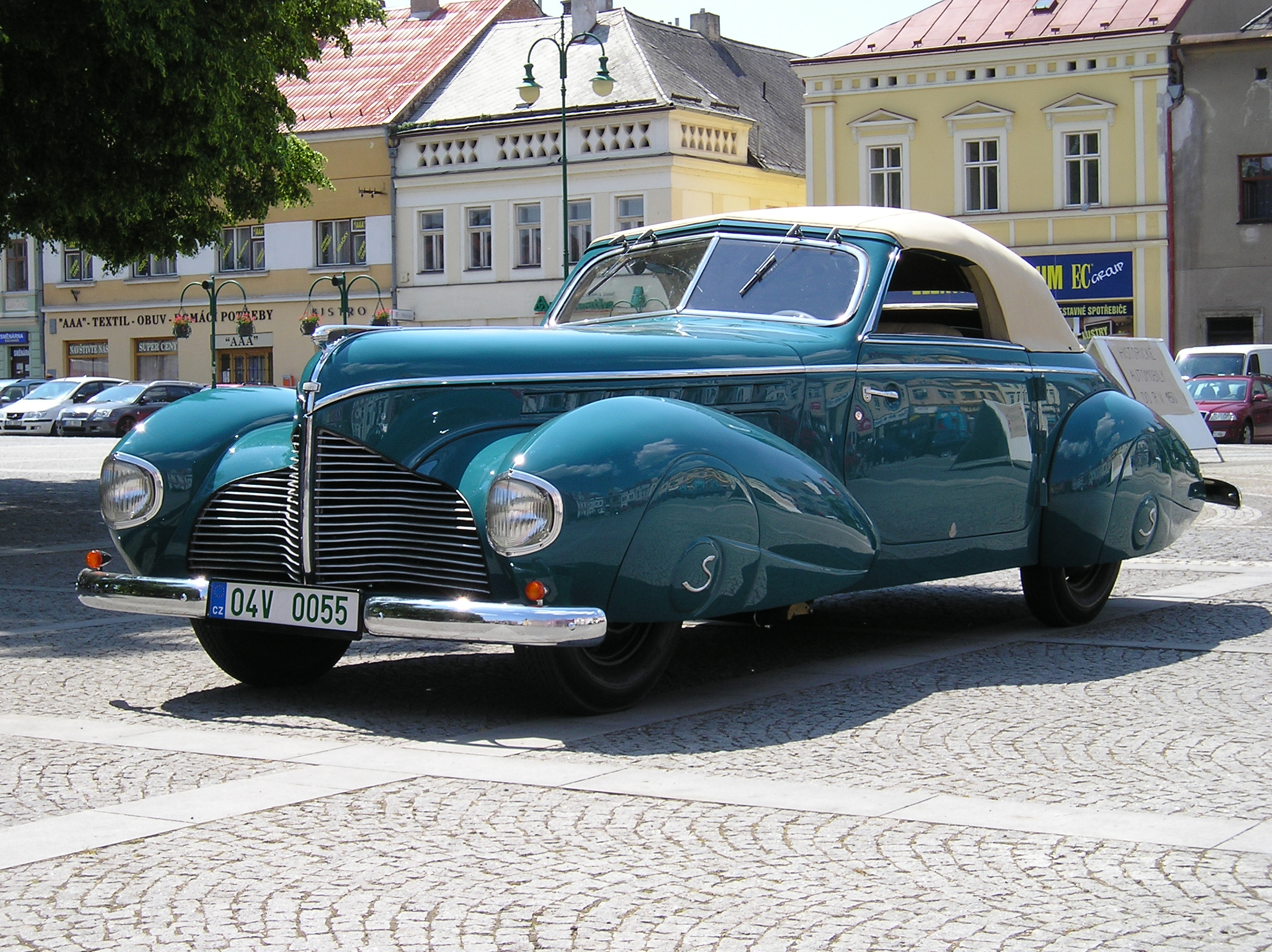
Aero 50 Dynamik with coachwork by Sodomka

Sodomka was a Czech coachbuilding company based in Vysoké Mýto. Josef Sodomka Sr. founded the company in 1895 as a carriage workshop. His son, Josef Sodomka Jr., persuaded him to start making car bodies in 1925. Its passenger-car coachwork used chassis made by Czechoslovak manufacturers, including Praga, Škoda, Tatra and Aero, and foreign marques such as Bugatti, Lancia and Rolls-Royce.

During the 1930s, the company became known for its streamlined designs, including bodies for the Walter Regent and Aero 50.

The company built its first bus body in 1928. Buses and commercial-vehicle bodies became increasingly important to its production during 1930s. In 1948, the company was nationalised and incorporated into Karosa.

== History ==
=== Origins and early development ===
Josef Sodomka Sr. established a wheelwright’s workshop in Vysoké Mýto under the name První východočeská výroba kočárů Josefa Sodomky (First East Bohemian Carriage Manufacture of Josef Sodomka). The company traditionally dated its foundation to 1895, although the earliest surviving official document concerning the business dates from 22 May 1896. At first, Sodomka repaired carts and carriages. In 1897, he bought a house with enough space to build carriages of his own. He installed a steam engine in 1905 as production expanded.

Carriage orders fell after the First World War, and the business came close to bankruptcy. In 1925, Josef Sodomka Jr. returned from Laurin & Klement in Mladá Boleslav and convinced his father to try building car bodies. The first car body was built in autumn 1925 on a Praga Mignon chassis for local transport operator Jan Šplíchal. In 1926, the firm made 31 car bodies.

Josef Jr. bought half the business from his father in 1930. He became sole owner in 1931 following the death of his stepmother and the settlement of his sisters’ shares.

=== Passenger-car coachwork ===
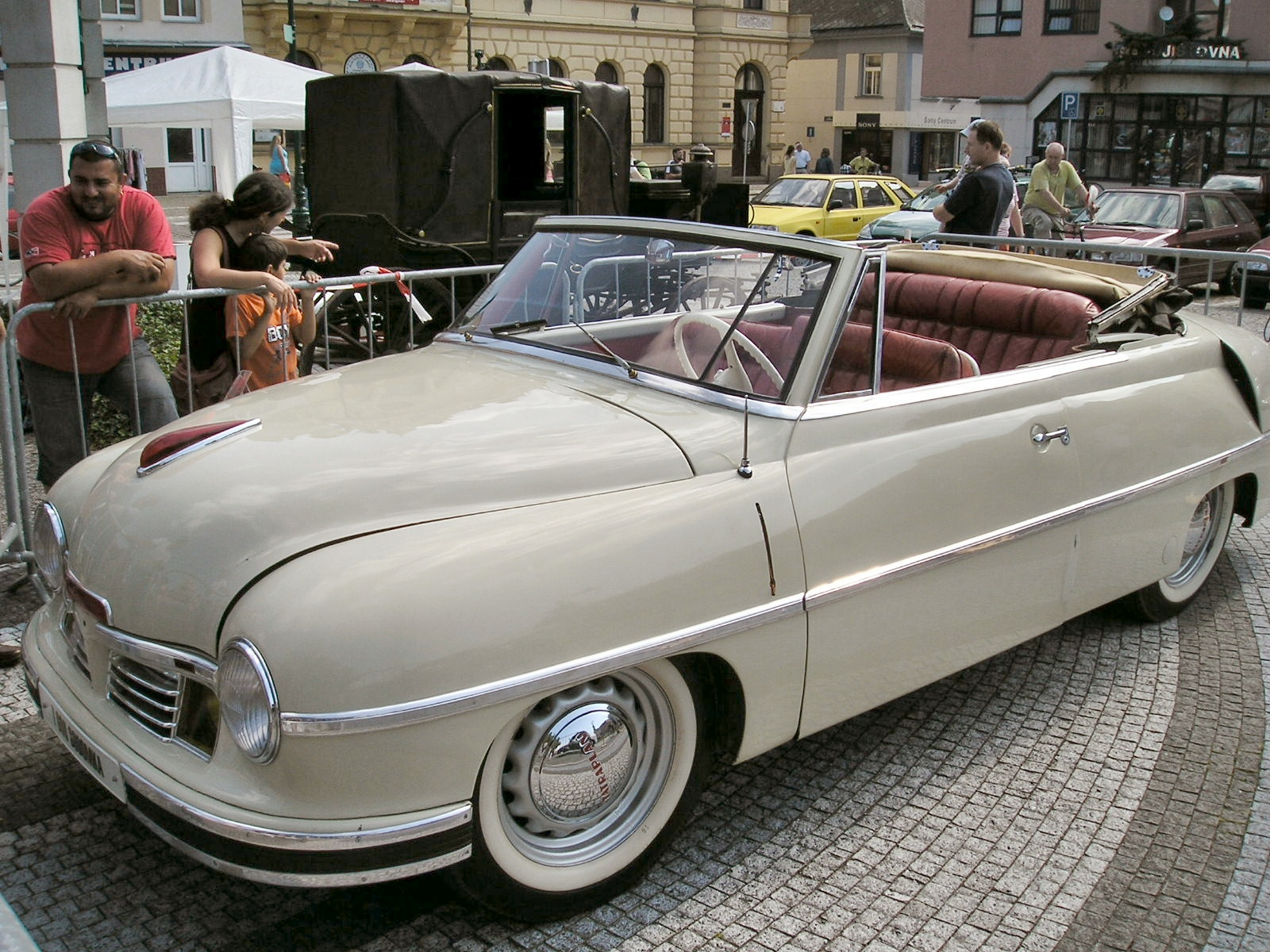
Tatra 600 Cabriolet with bodywork by Sodomka

Sodomka built bodies to order on Czechoslovak and foreign chassis, for both luxury cars and specialised vehicles. It also replaced existing bodywork: in 1931, it fitted an older Tatra 17/31 with a new sedan body.

In the 1930s, Sodomka adopted more rounded shapes, with longer wings and radiator grilles tilted back. Its coachwork won prizes at concours d'elegance in Czechoslovakia, Budapest, Nice and Monte Carlo. Actor Jan Werich ordered a Tatra 52 convertible in 1932. Hana Benešová, wife of President Edvard Beneš, bought an Aero 50 with a Sodomka body in 1937.

Among its streamlined designs was the Walter Regent Air Speed of 1935. This four-door sedan had no fixed centre pillars, partially recessed headlights and a long, sloping rear body. Sodomka also built related Regent convertibles. The later Aero 50 Dynamik had teardrop-shaped wings enclosing the wheels and headlights set into the front wings.

=== Buses and wartime production ===
1928 Škoda 125 firefighting bus bodied by Sodomka

The company built its first bus body in 1928 on a Škoda 125 chassis, with seats for fourteen passengers. Six buses were completed that year. Early buses were individually built to customers’ requirements, built on Praga, Škoda, Tatra and Walter chassis, and total production reached forty by 1936. State orders subsequently brought larger batches: twelve identical bodies on Tatra 82 chassis were built in 1937, followed in 1938 by seventeen buses on Škoda 606 DN chassis for Czechoslovak State Railways. One of the latter was a luxury coach for the Prague–Karlovy Vary route.

During the Second World War, production increasingly centred on buses, ambulances, mobile workshops and trailers. Sodomka supplied bodies for fourteen Bratislava trolleybuses, combining MAN chassis with Siemens-Schuckert electrical equipment. Delivered in 1940, they entered passenger service in July 1941. In 1944, the company received an order for 318 ambulance bodies on Škoda 256 B chassis.

=== Postwar production and nationalisation ===
After the war, the factory concentrated on buses, trailers and commercial-vehicle bodies, including buses of the Škoda 706 RO type. At the 1947 Prague Motor Show, it exhibited the Škoda 706 RO Pullman, a luxury-coach prototype with luggage compartments accessible from the sides. Passenger-car work continued, including an open-bodied Aero Minor and a luxury Škoda Superb convertible, both presented in 1947.

The business employed 477 people during its postwar expansion and acquired land for a planned new factory. Employee housing was built in 1947–1948. In 1948, the factory was nationalised and incorporated into the newly established Karosa enterprise, which also brought together coachbuilding businesses in other towns.

Josef Sodomka Jr. initially remained in charge of the Vysoké Mýto works. Under his management, the factory built a Tatra 600 convertible displayed at the 1949 Geneva Motor Show and later sent to the Soviet Union as a gift for Joseph Stalin’s seventieth birthday. Sodomka was arrested in November 1950 and subsequently imprisoned. After his release, he was barred from returning to Karosa and worked as a designer and testing technician at LIAZ in Mnichovo Hradiště.

Bus manufacturing continued at Vysoké Mýto under Karosa. As of 2026, the former Sodomka factory in Vysoké Mýto is operated by Iveco Czech Republic, a subsidiary of Iveco, and manufactures buses under the Iveco brand.

== Literature ==
- Jan Černý: Automobily Tatra s karoseriemi Sodomka, Vysoké Mýto, Regionální muzeum ve Vysokém Mýtě, 2007, ISBN 978-80-239-9453-7
- Jan Černý: Automobily Aero s karoseriemi Sodomka, Vysoké Mýto, Regionální muzeum ve Vysokém Mýtě, 2008, ISBN 978-80-254-2190-1
- Jan Černý: Autobusové karoserie Sodomka na podvozcích Tatra, Vysoké Mýto, Regionální muzeum ve Vysokém Mýtě, 2008, ISBN 978-80-254-2189-5
- Jan Černý, Martin Štěpán: Automobily Praga s karoseriemi Sodomka, Vysoké Mýto, Regionální muzeum ve Vysokém Mýtě, 2009, ISBN 978-80-254-4587-7
- Jan Tulis: Sodomka, Brno, Autoklub při pedagogické fakultě Masarykovy university v Brně, 1990
- Kulíšek, Vítězslav (2018). Vzestup a pád českého podnikatele: Josef Sodomka (1904-1964) [The Rise and Fall of a Czech Entrepreneur: Josef Sodomka (1904-1964)]. Vlastním nákladem autora. ISBN 978-80-270-3458-1.
