= Karosa C 834 =

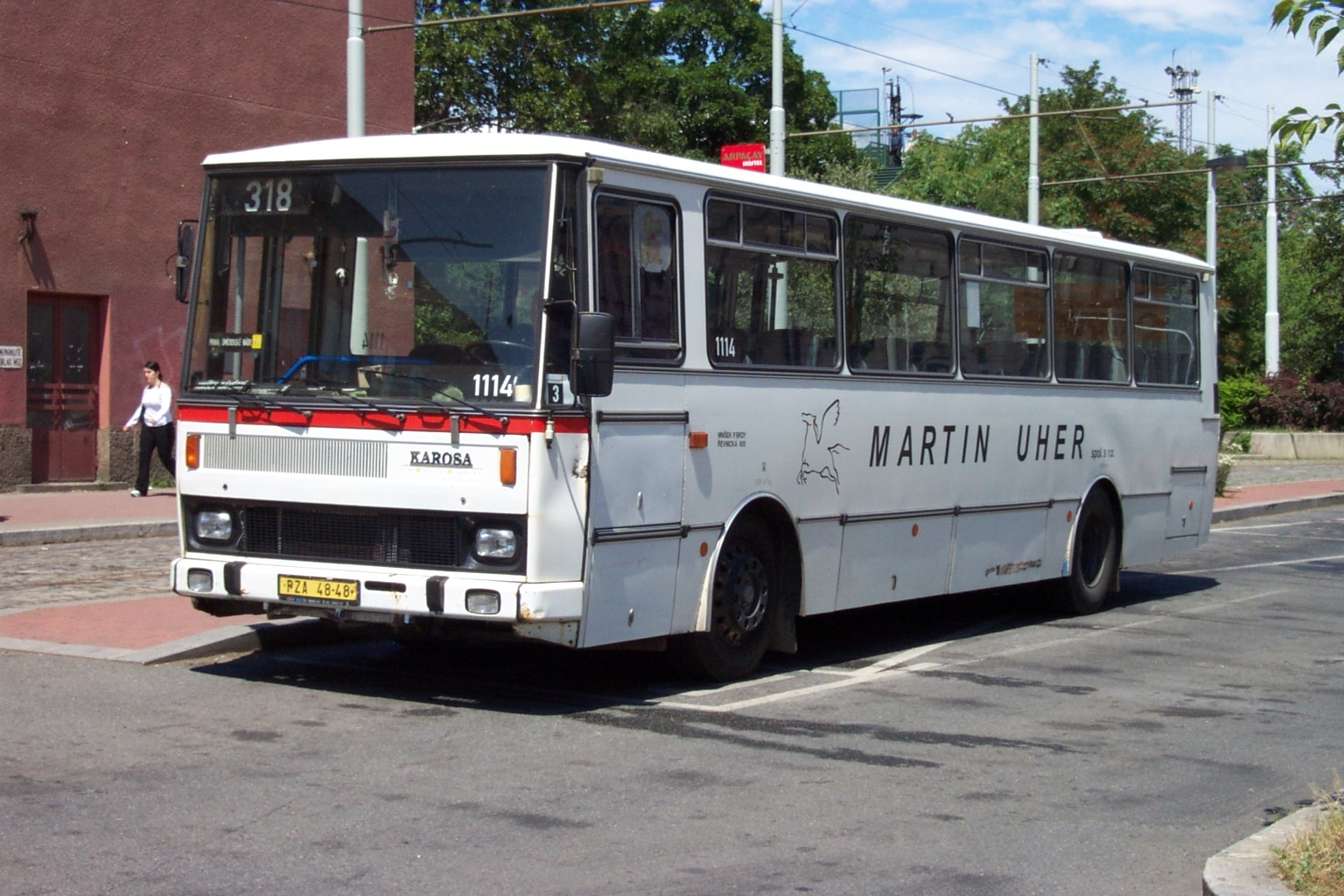
- Karosa C 834

Overview
- Manufacturer: Karosa

Body and chassis
- Doors: 2, air-operated
- Floor type: High-floor
- Chassis: semi-self-supporting with frame

Powertrain
- Engine: LIAZ ML 635 V6 Diesel engine LIAZ ML 636 N V6 Diesel engine
- Power output: 148 kW (198 hp) (LIAZ ML 635); 155 kW (208 hp) (LIAZ ML 636 N)
- Transmission: Praga 5-speed manual

Dimensions
- Length: 11,055 mm (435.2 in)
- Width: 2,500 mm (98.4 in)
- Height: 3,165 mm (124.6 in)
- Curb weight: 9,500 kg (20,900 lb)-10,050 kg (22,160 lb)

Chronology
- Predecessor: Karosa C 734
- Successor: Karosa C 934

Karosa C 834 is an intercity bus produced from 1997 to 1999 by bus manufacturer Karosa from the Czech Republic. It was succeeded by Karosa C 934 in 1999.

== Construction features ==
Karosa C 834 is basic model of Karosa 800 series. C 834 is based on its predecessor, Karosa C 734 and is unified with city bus models B 832 and B 841. Body is semi-self-supporting with frame and engine with manual gearbox in the rear part. Only rear axle is propulsed. Front axle is independent, rear axle is solid. All axles are mounted on air suspension. On the right side are two doors. Between the axles underneath the bodywork is luggage compartment volume of 3.5 m³. Hot water heating is efficient at temperatures lower than 0 °C, however, the problem of the whole bus is heat. Difficulties are also vented at high temperatures, since the sliding parts are located in only two windows on the right side and three on the left. Airstream ventilation from two fans can not effectively exchange air. Seats for passengers are spaced as 2 + 2 with the central aisle. Drivers cab is not separated from the rest of the vehicle.

== Production and operation ==
Production of buses C 834 began in 1997 (after end of production 700 series) and was completed in 1999, when it began to be to the countries of the former Soviet Union exported buses from 900 series. Production 800 Series, and therefore the type C 834, began because of problems with the approval of the new 900 series buses in these states. A total of 36 buses C 834 was made. The vast majority of C 834 was intended to export in the former Soviet Union. Due to financial problems of some buyers C 834 appeared also in Czech Republic and Slovak Republic.

== See also ==
- List of buses
