= Karosa B 951 =

Czech urban bus

Karosa B951
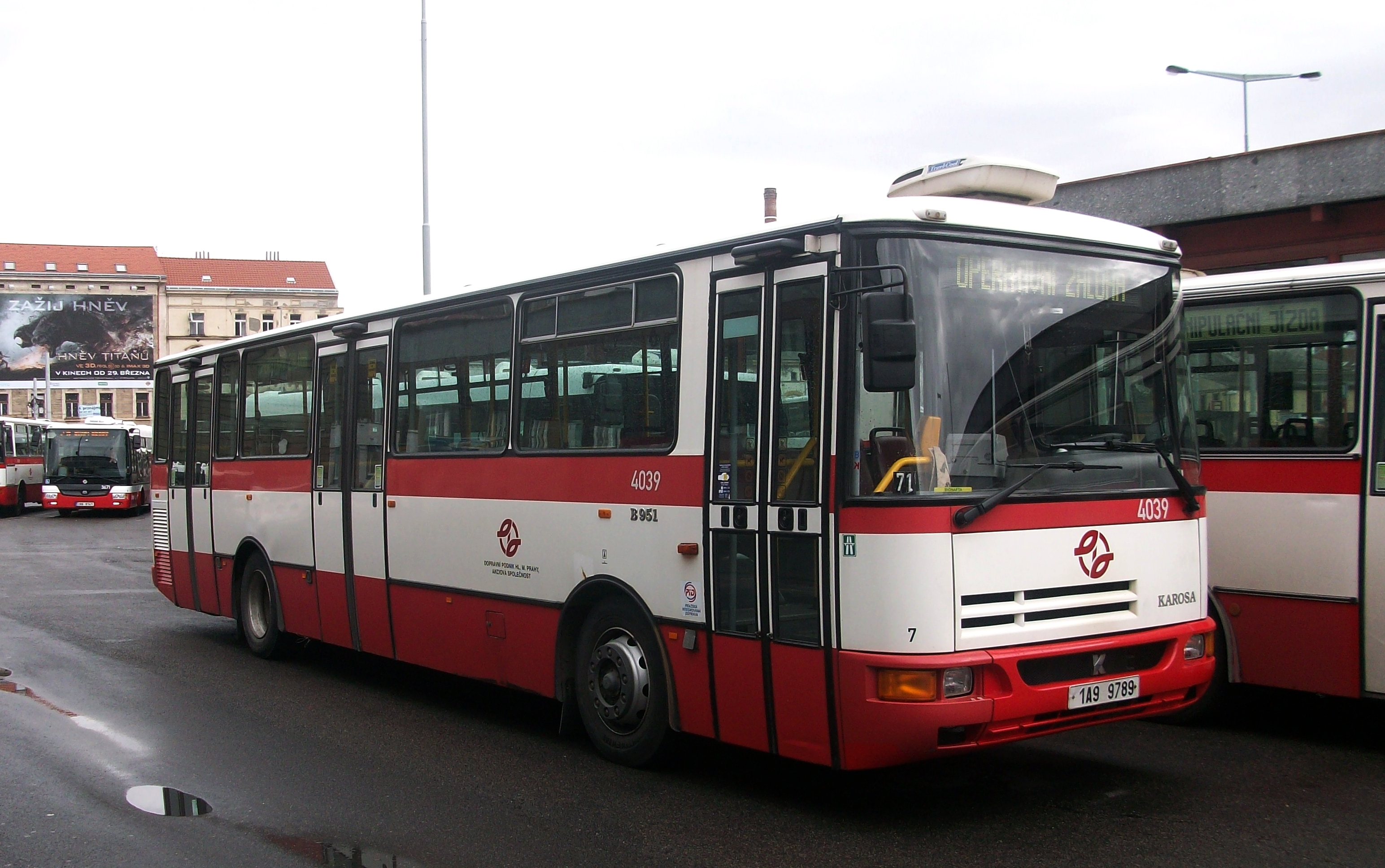
- Karosa B951 no.4039 from 2002 of Prague transport company

Overview
- Manufacturer: Karosa

Body and chassis
- Doors: 3, air-operated
- Floor type: High-floor
- Chassis: semi-self-supporting with frame

Powertrain
- Engine: Iveco Cursor 8 Euro III V6 Diesel engine
- Power output: 210 kW (282 hp)
- Transmission: Voith DIWA 3-speed automatic

Dimensions
- Length: 11,320 mm (445.7 in)
- Width: 2,500 mm (98.4 in)
- Height: 3,165 mm (124.6 in)
- Curb weight: 10,200 kg (22,500 lb)

Chronology
- Predecessor: Karosa B 931
- Successor: Irisbus Citelis

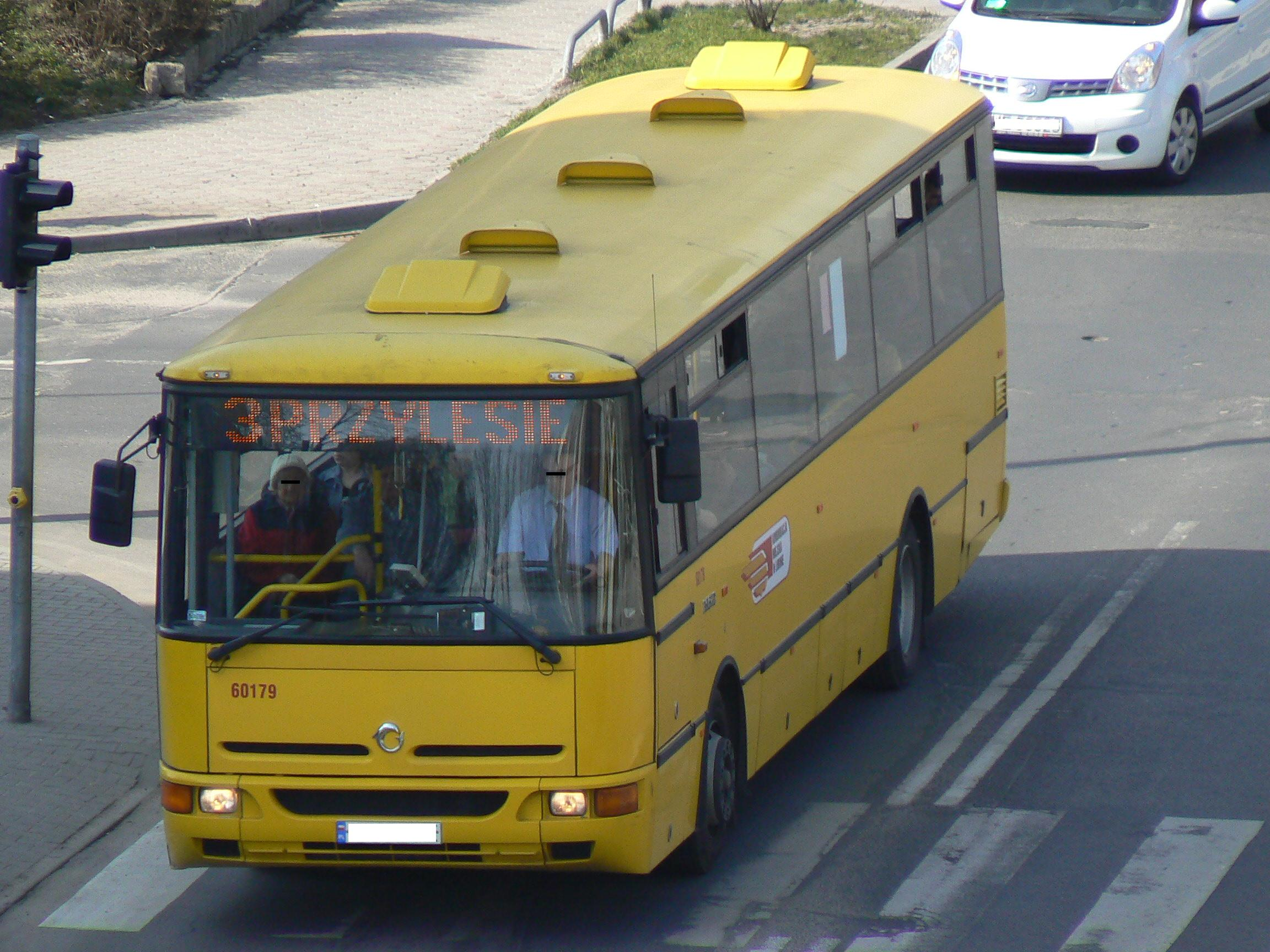
Karosa B 951 E in Lubin, Poland

Karosa B 951 is an urban bus produced from 2002 to 2006 by bus manufacturer Karosa from the Czech Republic. An updated version, B951E, was introduced in 2003.

== Construction features ==
Karosa B 951 is a model of the Karosa 900 series. The B 951 is unified with city bus models such as the B 952 and the B 961. The body was assembled to the skeleton, which has undergone a dip stage, sheets were galvanized and painted and then to have it installed additional components. The body is semi-self-supporting with frame and engine with automatic gearbox is placed in the rear part. The engine drives only the rear axle. The front and rear axles are solid. All the axles are mounted on air suspension. On the right side are three doors (first are narrower than middle doors). Inside are used plastic Vogelsitze or Ster seats. The driver's cab is separated from the rest of the vehicle by a glazed partition. In the middle part is room for a pram or wheelchair.

== Production and operation ==
In 2002 started serial production, which continued until 2006. Since 2003 were buses produced only modernised version B 951 E, which had glass glued to skeleton, instead of glass mounted in rubber and better ventilation of the engine compartment.

== Historical vehicles ==
Any historical vehicle was not saved yet.

== See also ==
- Technical specs on manufacturers page (on web archive)
- List of buses
