= Aero (automobile) =

- Aero logo of Harald H Linz

Overview
- Production: 1929–1947
- Assembly: Czechoslovak Republic

The Aero was a Czechoslovak automobile company that produced a variety of models between 1929 and 1947 by a well-known aircraft and car-body company owned by Dr. Kabes in Prague-Vysocany. Now Aero Vodochody produces aircraft only.

== Type 10 ==
The original Aero model, the Type 500 or Type 10 was a small car launched in 1928. Powered by a 494 cc single-cylinder two-stroke engine with water cooling, producing 10 bhp (7 kW; 10 PS), it could reach a top speed of 70 km/h (43 mph). Drive was through a 3-speed gearbox to a rear axle without differential. The Type 10 was sold with a choice of body styles; roadster, cabriolet and coupé, all with two seats in the front and one in the rear. Production ran for four years, ending in 1932 with 1,358 built.

== Type 18 ==
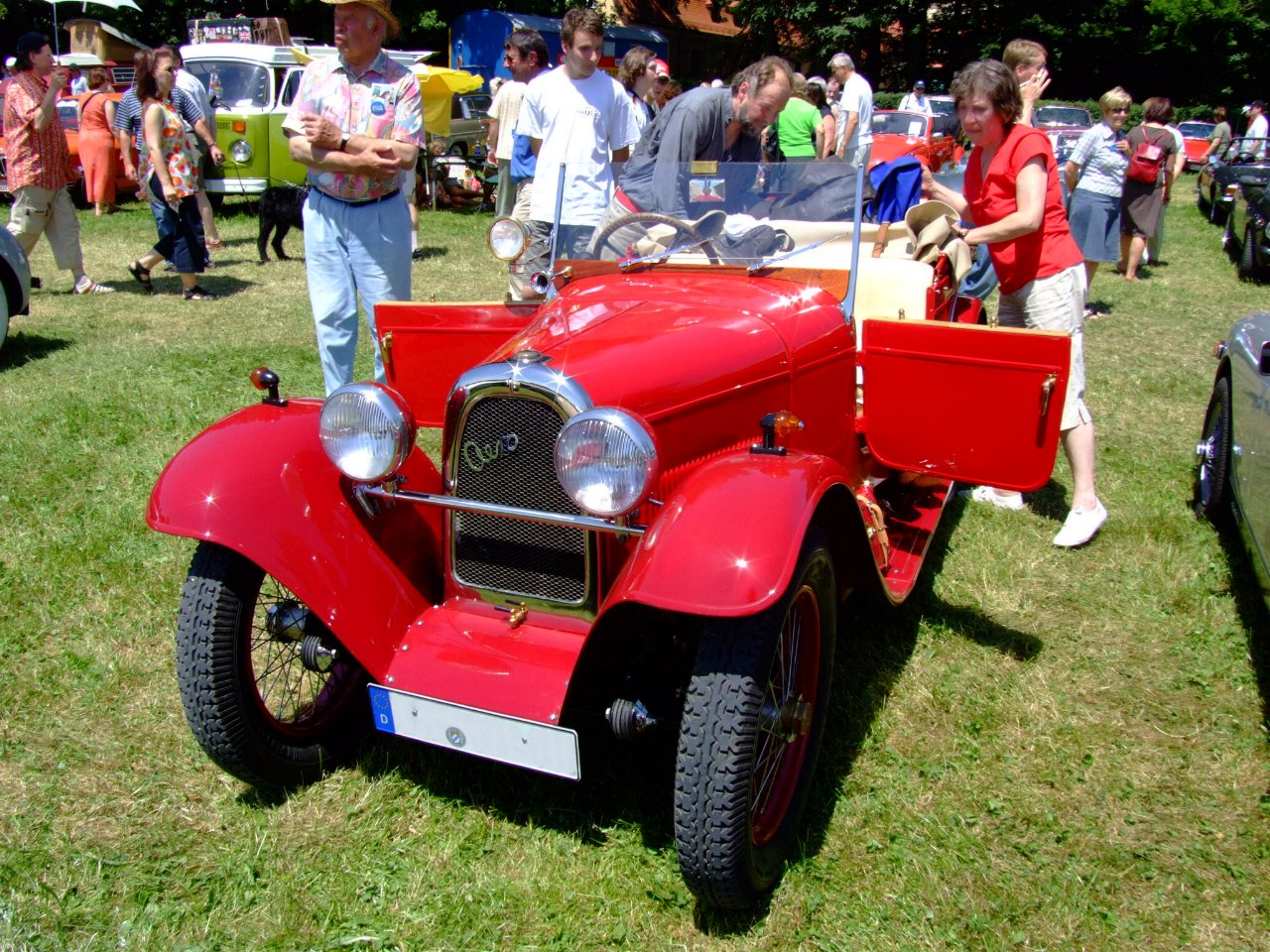
Aero 662

Announced in 1931, the Type 18 (also known as the 662) was powered by a larger 660 cc two-cylinder engine developing 18 bhp (13 kW; 18 PS), with a top speed of 90 km/h (55.9 mph). With improved four-wheel brakes, the Type 18 came as a 3-seater roadster and 4-seat saloon, made using steel-covered timber-framed coachwork. 2,615 Type 18s were built before manufacturing ceased in 1934.

== Type 20 ==
Based on the Type 18/662, the 1933 Type 20 (also known as the 1000) came with a larger 999 cc 26 bhp (19 kW; 26 PS) engine which would power the car to a top speed of 100 km/h (62 mph). Production lasted two years and ceased in 1934 after 2,546 were built.

== Type 30 ==
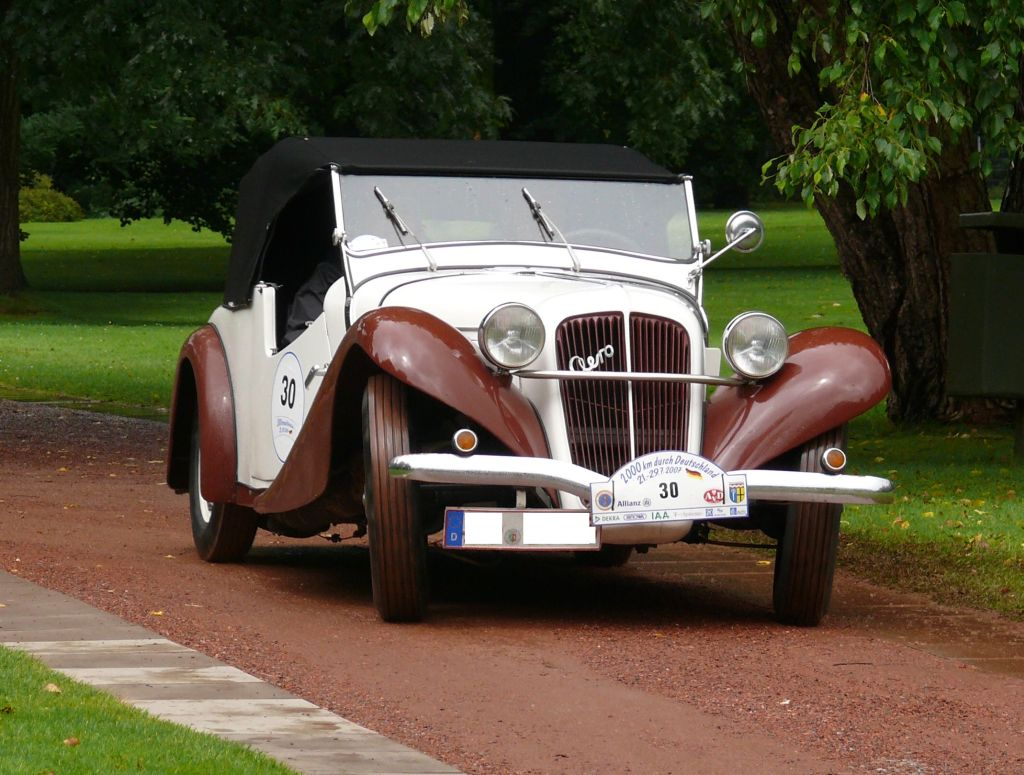
Aero 30

In 1934 the Type 30 was announced with a 998 cc 26 bhp (19 kW; 26 PS) twin-cylinder engine, front-wheel drive and all independent suspension. The car could reach 105 km/h (65 mph). The Type 30 was the most successful Aero model, and production reached 7,780 before manufacturing ended in 1940. Another 500 were produced post-war with a new radiator design but was stopped in 1947 when the company was nationalised.

== Type 50 ==
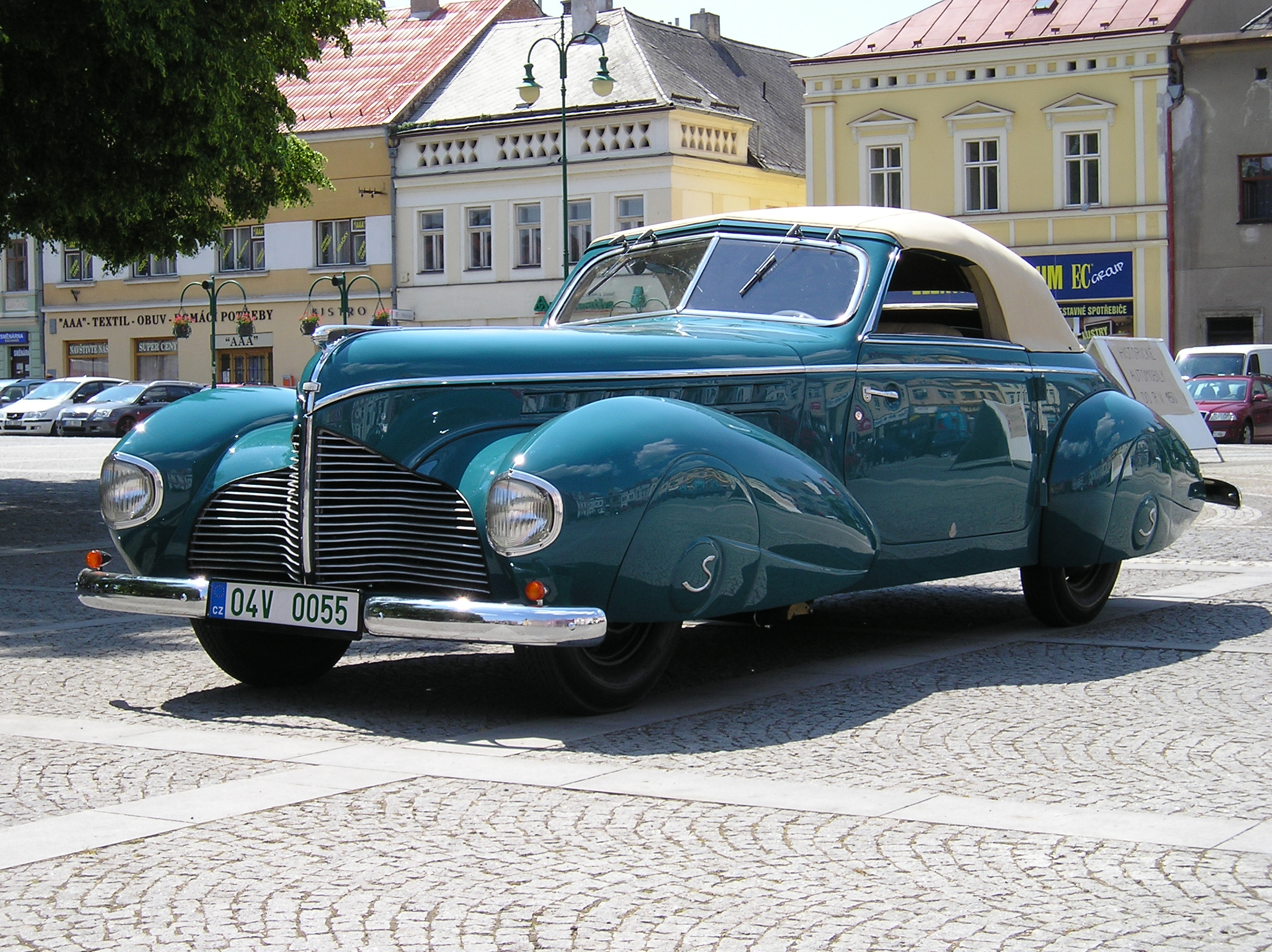
Aero 50 Dynamik (bodywork by Sodomka)

The last, and largest, Aero model was the Type 50 announced in 1936 and manufactured until 1942. The front-wheel-drive model had a 1997 cc four-cylinder 50 bhp (37 kW; 51 PS) two-stroke engine with twin alloy cylinder head and was capable of reaching 130 km/h (81 mph). 1,205 were made before the company closed.

== 750 Pony ==
The 750 Pony is a small two-seater convertible with only 2 models built as prototypes in 1941 and was intended for post war producing, but nationalisation of the company ended the plan. It was powered by a 745 cc engine producing 21 bhp (16 kW; 21 PS).

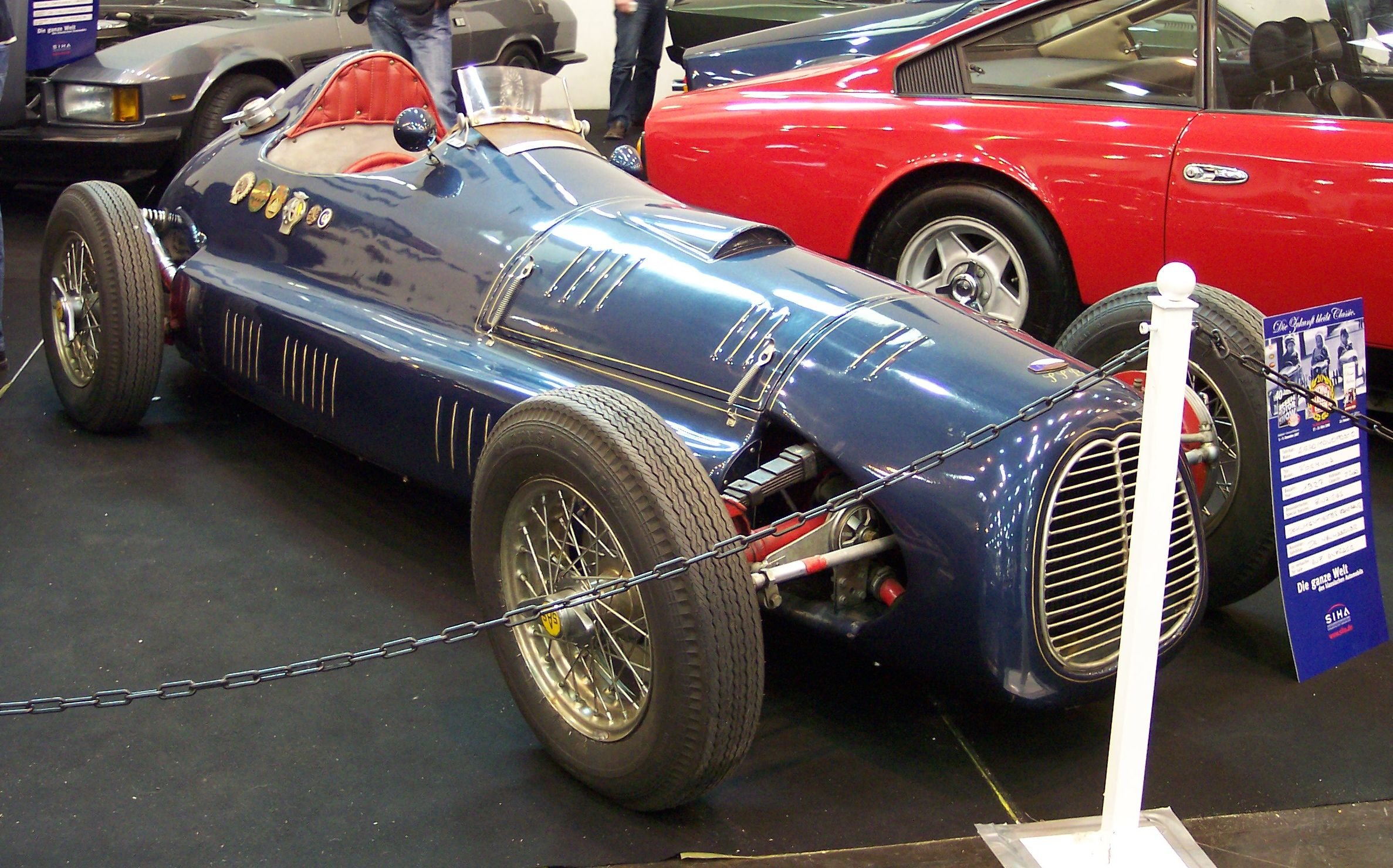
racing car Aero Monoposto (1927)
