= Karosa =

Czech Republic bus manufacturer (1896–1999)

Karosa a.s.

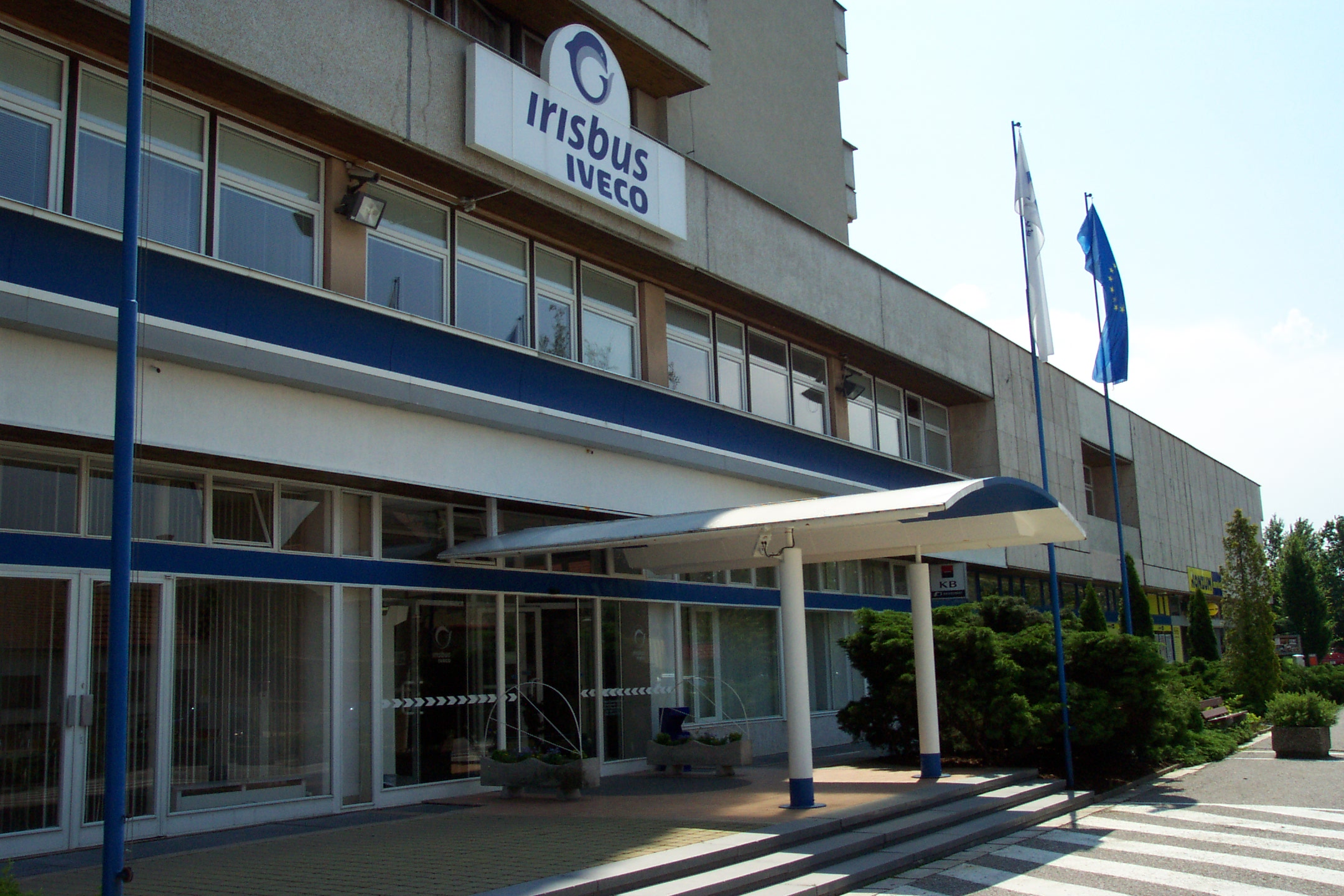
- Company headquarters in Vysoké Mýto
- Type: Joint-stock company
- Industry: Automotive
- Founded: 1895 (Sodomka); 1948 (as Karosa)
- Fate: Renamed Iveco Czech Republic in 2007
- Headquarters: Vysoké Mýto, Czech Republic
- Products: Buses
- Owner: Iveco

Karosa was a manufacturer of buses and coaches based in Vysoké Mýto, Czechoslovakia, later the Czech Republic. The company's predecessor was the Sodomka coachbuilding business, which was nationalised in 1948 and incorporated into the Karosa national enterprise. Its main bus ranges were the Š 11, 700 and 900 series.

Renault bought 34% of Karosa in 1994. In 1996, it also bought the European Bank for Reconstruction and Development's 17% share, giving it a majority stake. Karosa then became part of Irisbus, a group jointly owned by Renault and Iveco.

Iveco became the group’s sole owner in 2003. The Karosa name remained in use until January 2007, when the company became Iveco Czech Republic.

== Production of car bodies ==
In 1896, Josef Sodomka founded a manufacturing plant for coaches— First East Bohemian manufacture of carriages Josef Sodomka in Vysoké Mýto. In 1925, the Sodomka company started producing automobile bodywork of its own design, designed to be mounted on automobile chassis produced by Praga as the Mignon. In the 1930s, Sodomka became a successful company, winning automotive competitions for elegance and opening showrooms. The company created bodies for middle-ranked cars, but also for celebrities of the times, for example for Jan Werich on a Tatra 52 chassis and for the wife of President Beneš on an Aero 50 chassis. The company also created automobile bodies for various other Czech and foreign car companies.

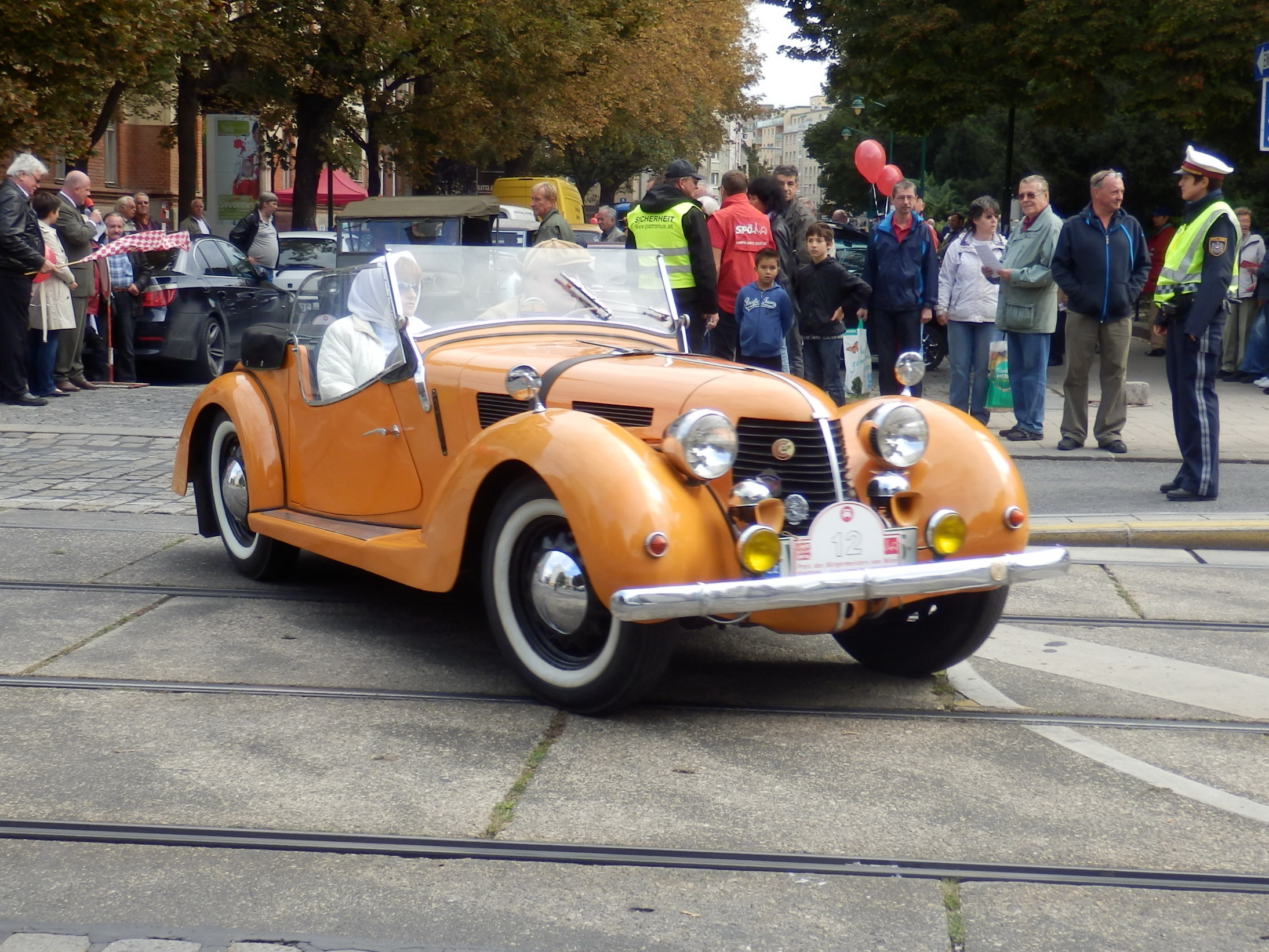
Aero 30 bodied by Sodomka

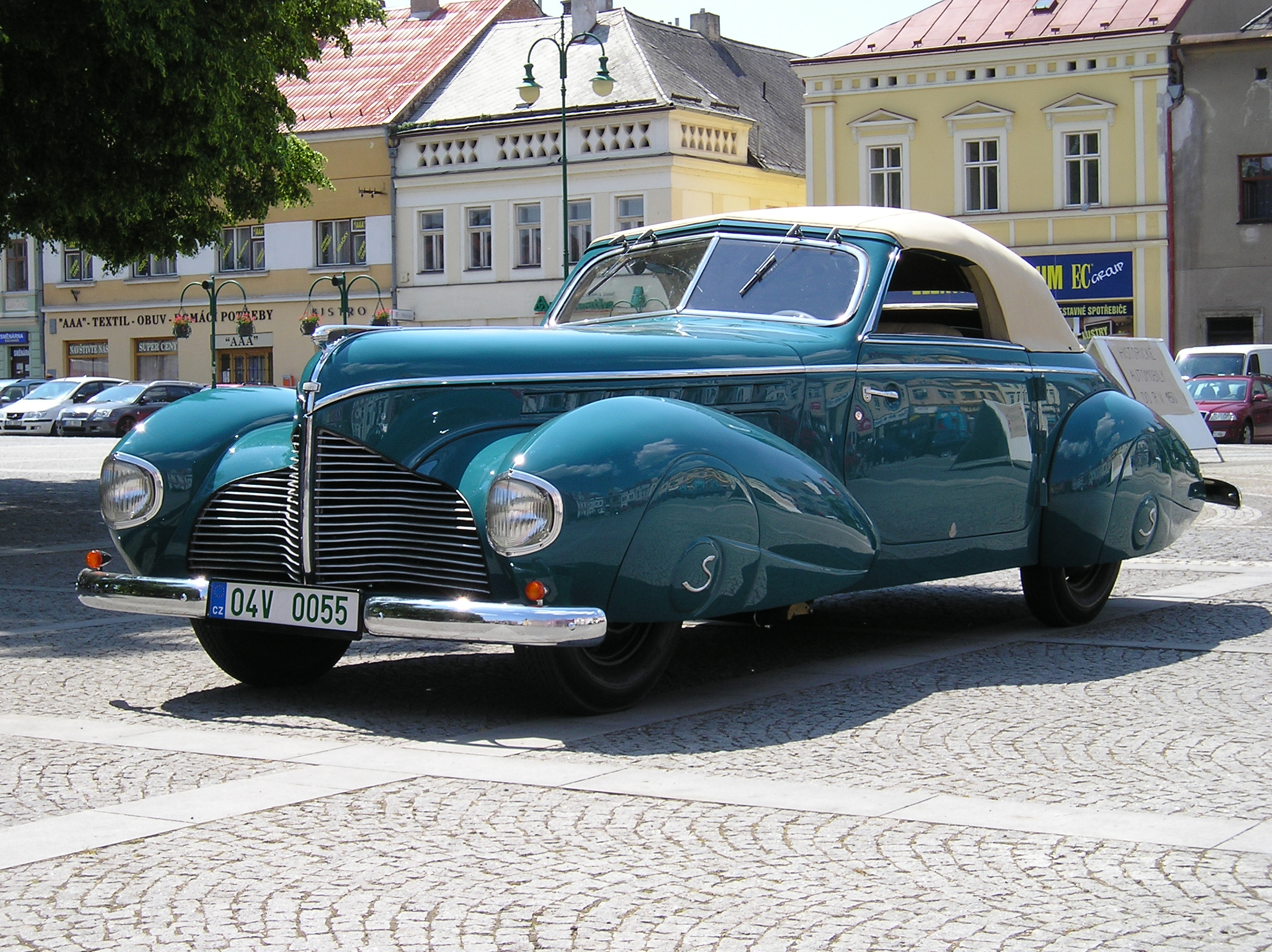
Aero 50 bodied by Sodomka

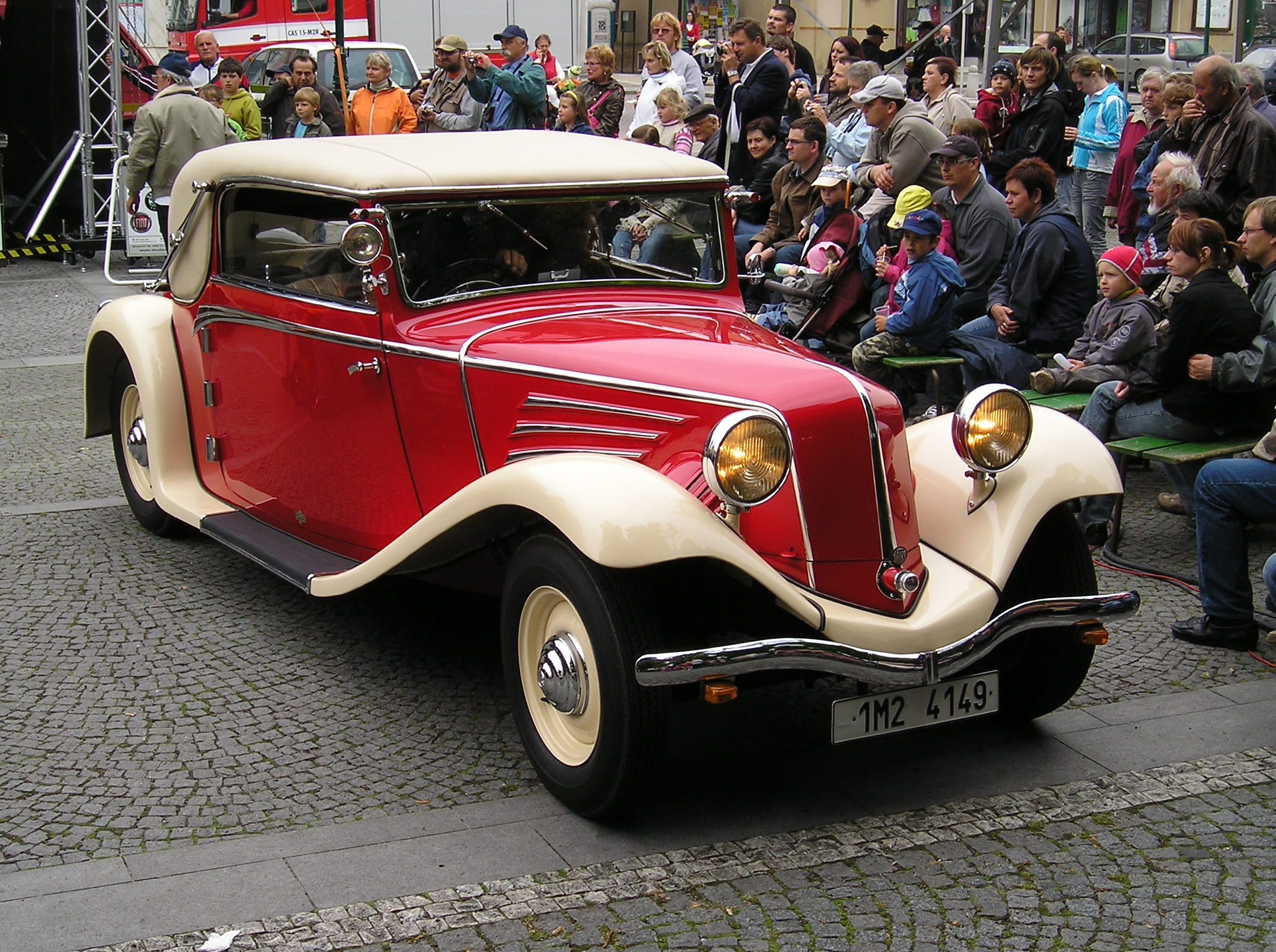
Tatra 52 with Sodomka bodywork.

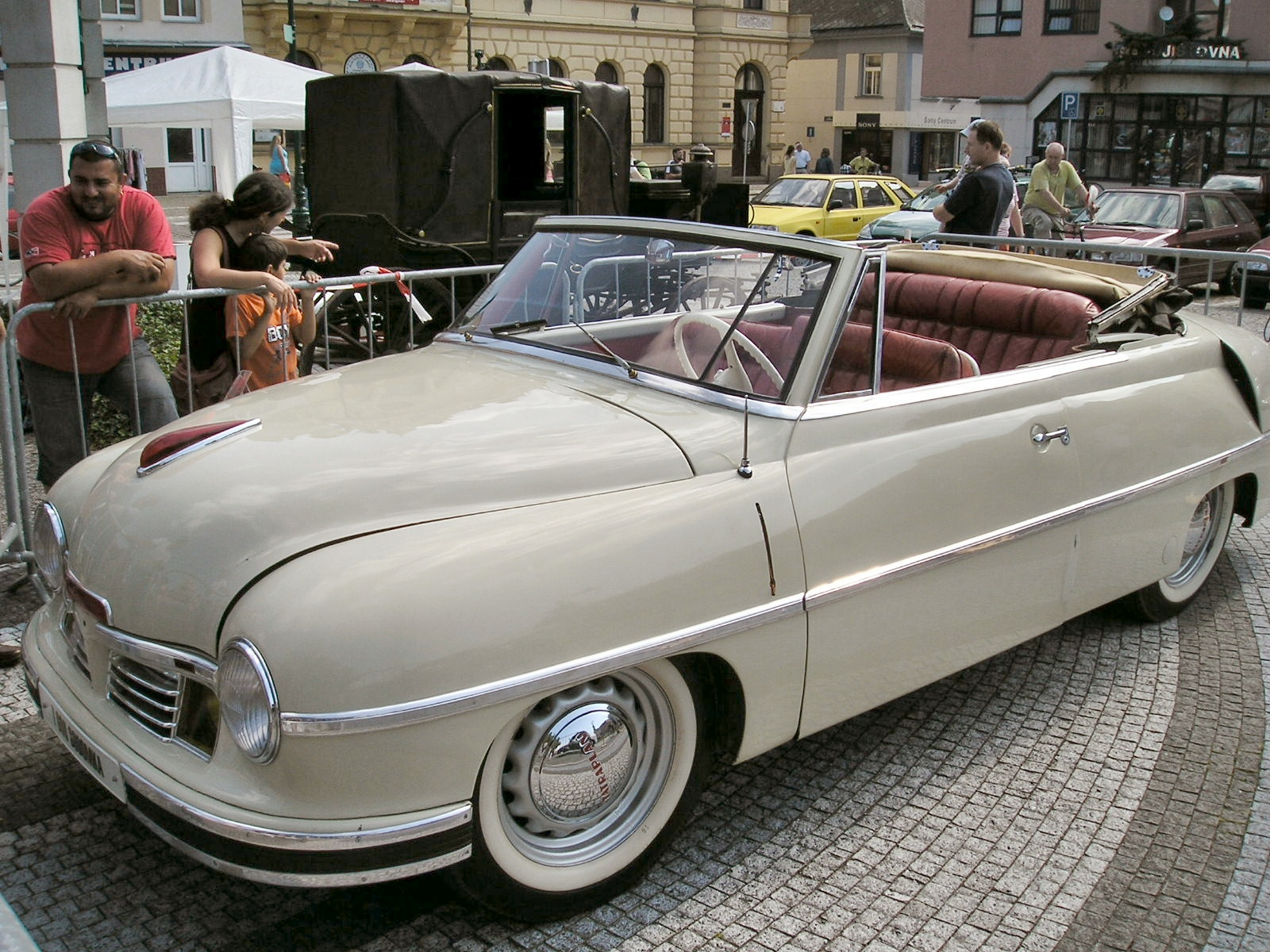
Tatra 600 bodied by Sodomka

== Bus production ==
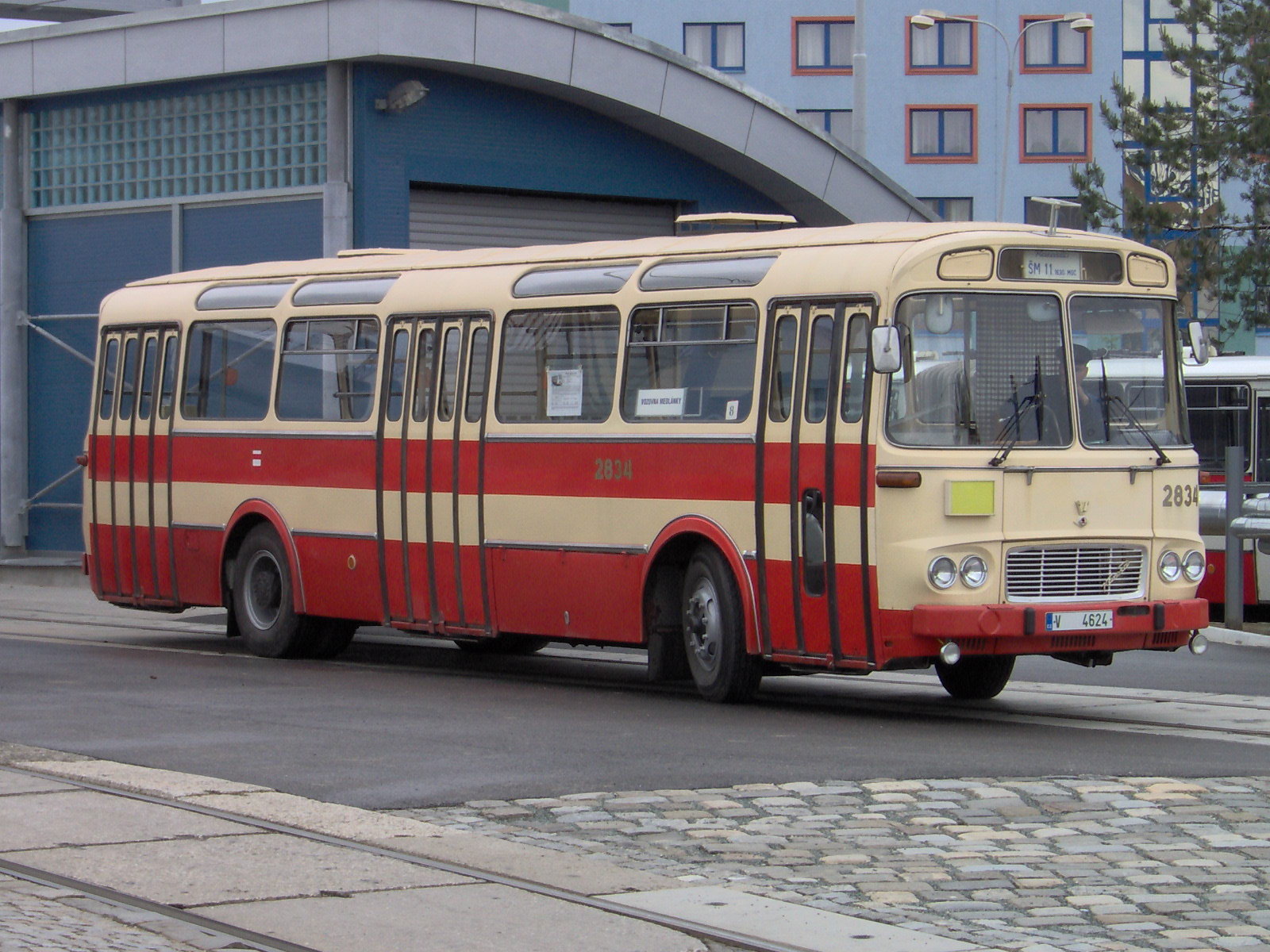
Karosa ŠM 11

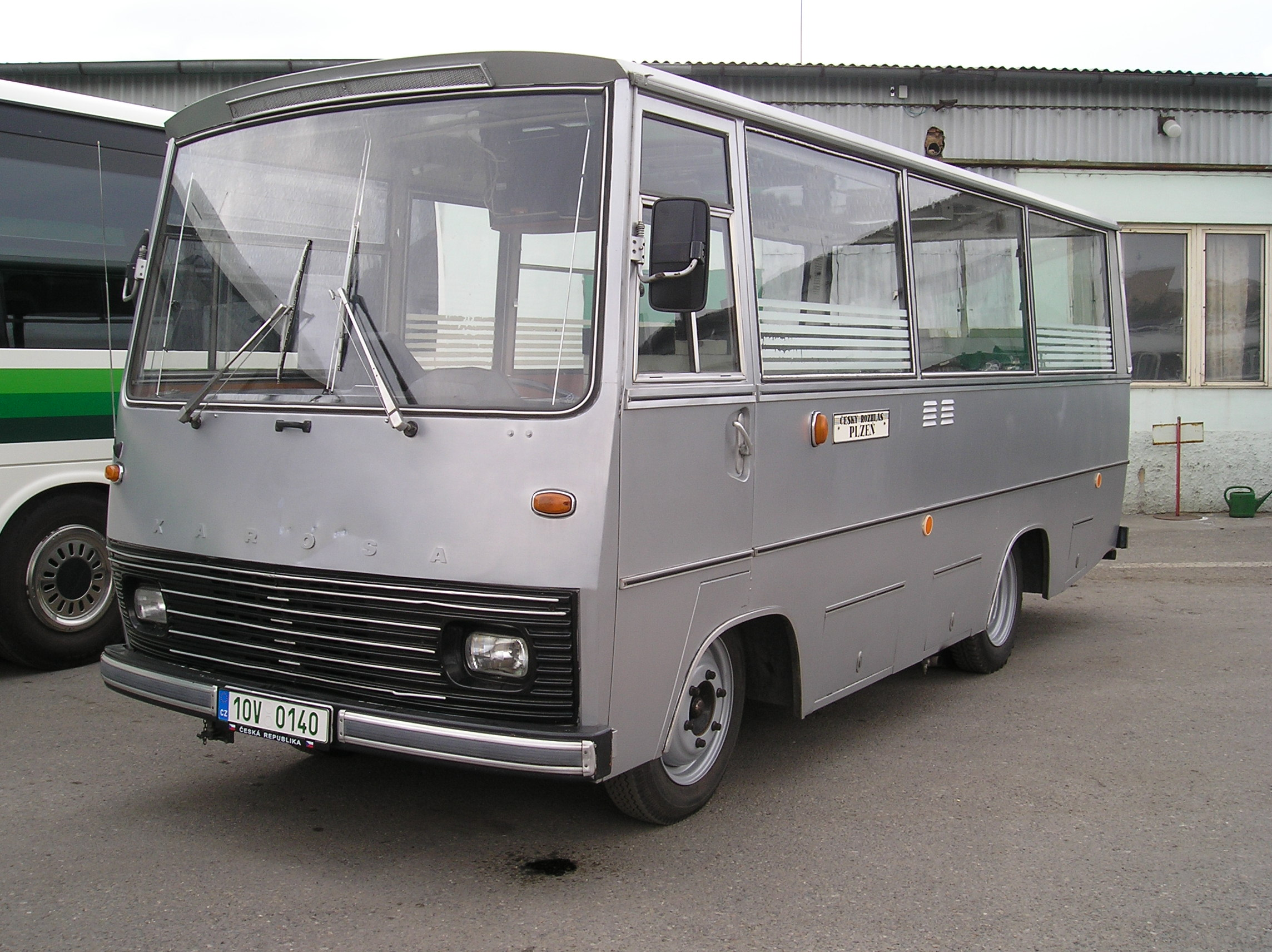
Karosa A 30 produced in 1968-1972

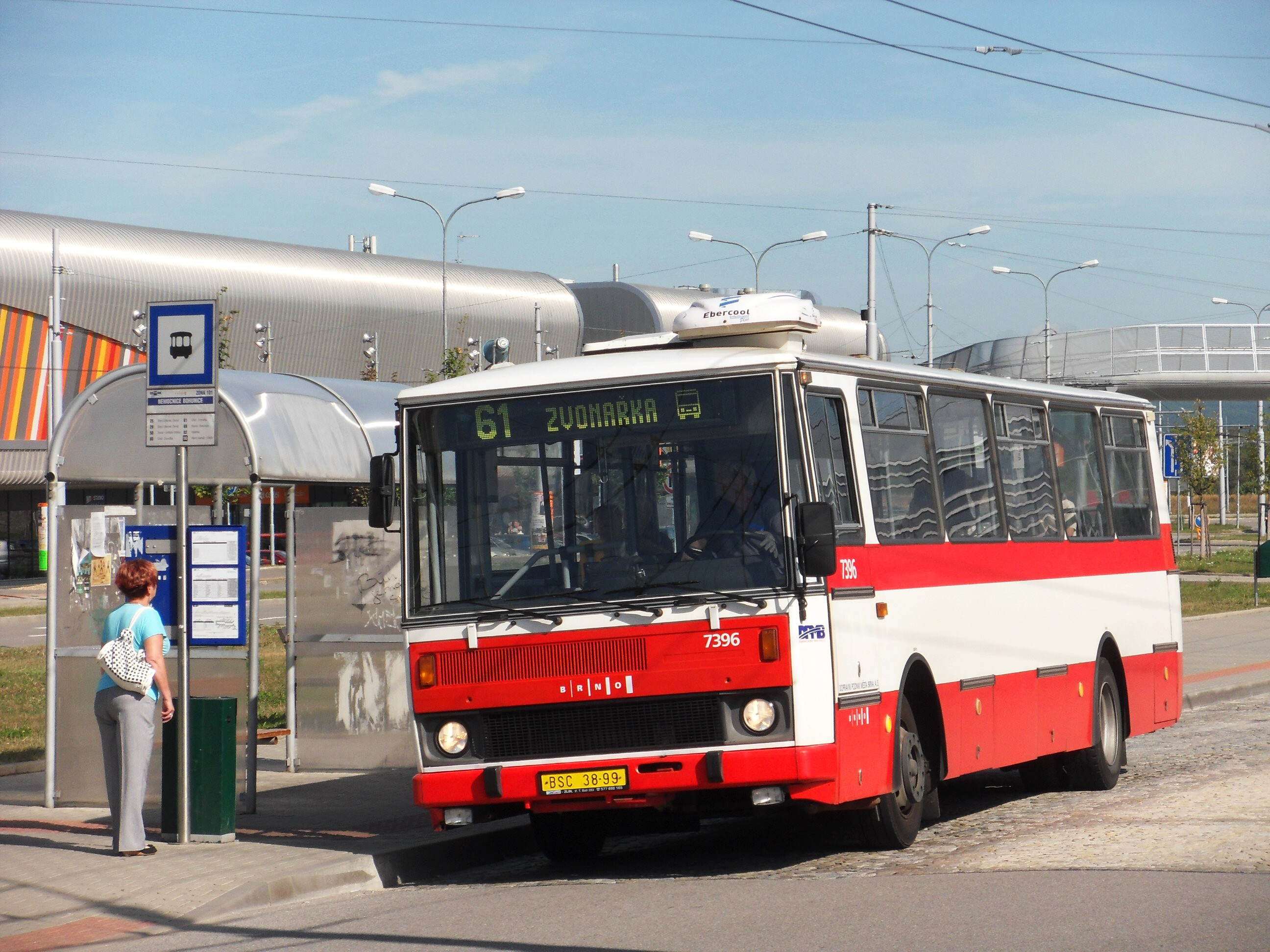
Karosa B 732

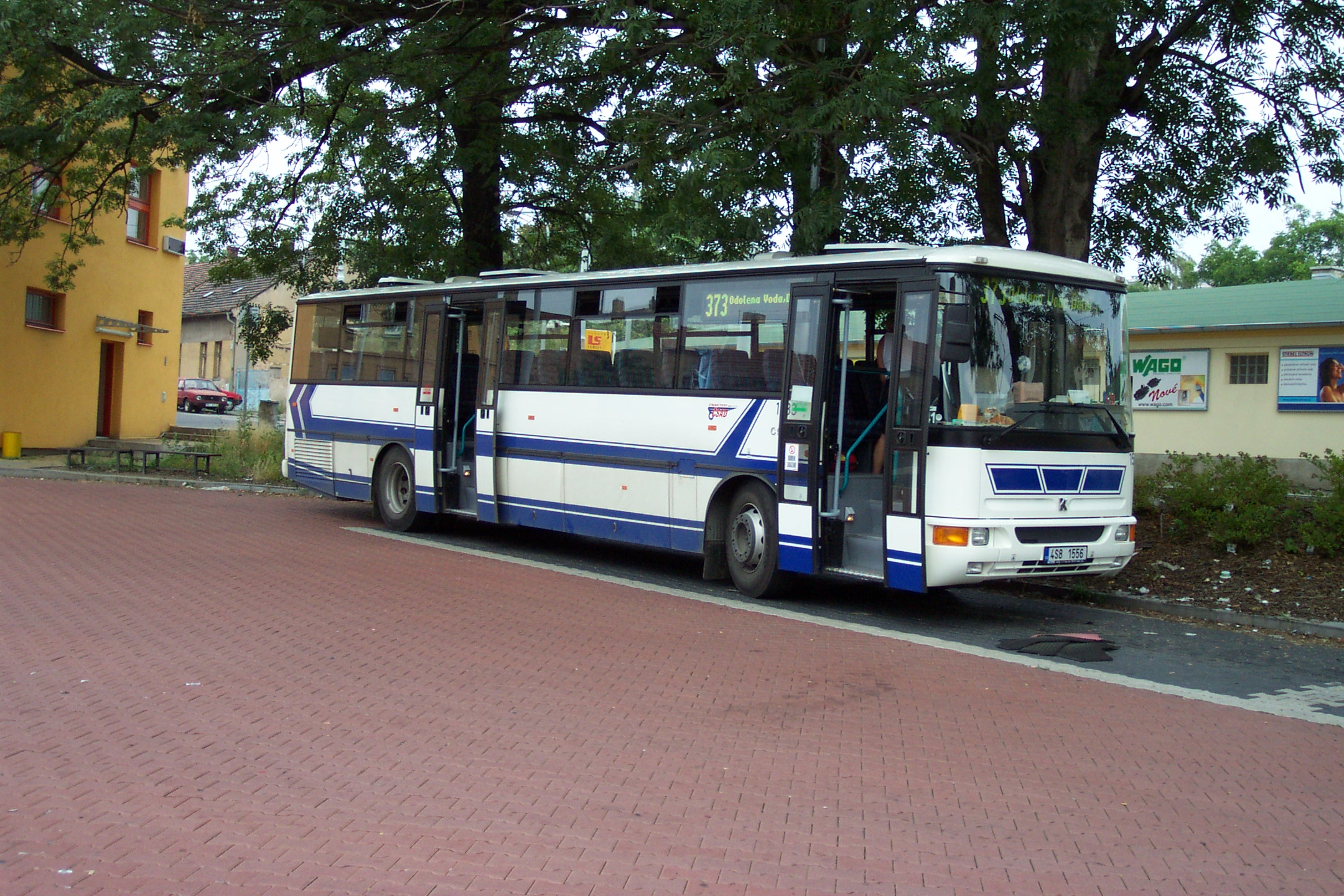
Karosa C 954

In 1948, the company was nationalized. Because the company's name included the owner's name, the company name was changed to that of Oldřich Uhlík in Prague. The company was also incorporated into a "National Enterprise", which was then given the name Karosa. At this time, Karosa became the sole manufacturer of buses in Czechoslovakia, as under central planning other manufacturers such as Škoda or Praga were not allowed to compete. At the end of the 1950s, Karosa began to produce the first well-known, popular models of urban buses such as the 706 RTO (for this model, however, Karosa only built the body), which were exhibited at numerous international exhibitions (e.g. Expo 58 in Brussels in the year 1958). This bus was then modified to demonstrate a version for intercity transport and even an articulated version, which remained only a prototype. The 706 RTO was replaced by Š series in 1964, which was also built as a trolleybus. The factory used today was built in 1972, but the company renovated it recently. In 1981, Karosa introduced the new 700 series.

In 1989, after the fall of the communist regime, Karosa had to adapt to the massive socio-economic changes, and its buses became conceptually underdeveloped. Its production was reduced to only 1,000 buses a year, from 3,400 buses in 1989. Still, Karosa was able to continue production, mainly due to investment by the French Renault company. Karosa had to be completely modernized, both in manufacturing and in the complete redesign of its buses.

In 1994, Karosa was bought by Renault. In 1995, the new Karosa 900 series started production. This bus was the redesign of the 700 series. In 1999, Karosa became part of a pan-European venture holding company, Irisbus, which was founded by Renault and its Italian partner, Iveco. Iveco took over the whole Irisbus in 2003. Buses made in Karosa's Vysoké Mýto plant were sold in France, Italy, Germany, Finland, Switzerland, the Benelux countries, the Russian Federation and even in countries such as Guadeloupe in the Caribbean, Réunion Island in the Indian Ocean, Beirut and in Egypt.

=== Bus models ===
- Karosa Š Series

  - Karosa ŠM 11
  - Karosa ŠM 16,5
  - Karosa ŠL 11
  - Karosa ŠD 11
  - Škoda T 11

- Karosa 700 Series

  - Karosa B 731
  - Karosa B 732
  - Karosa B 741
  - Karosa C 734
  - Karosa C 744
  - Karosa LC 735
  - Karosa LC 736
  - Karosa LC 737 - HD12

- Karosa 800 Series

  - Karosa B 831
  - Karosa B 832
  - Karosa C 834
  - Karosa C 835
  - Karosa B 841

- Karosa Series 900

  - Karosa B 931
  - Karosa B 932
  - Karosa B 941
  - Karosa B 951
  - Karosa B 961
  - Karosa C 934
  - Karosa C 935
  - Karosa C 954
  - Karosa C 955
  - Karosa C 956 Axer
  - Karosa LC 936
  - Karosa LC 937 - GT11
  - Karosa LC 956

== Present ==
In 2007, Karosa's name was changed to Iveco Czech Republic. In 2013, the name was changed again and the company now produces buses under the name Iveco Bus. It is Europe's largest factory for the production of buses. Since 2005, the factory has produced the Irisbus Arway, Irisbus Récréo, and Irisbus Citelis, but now production is mainly focused on the Iveco Crossway and Iveco Urbanway buses.

== Gallery ==
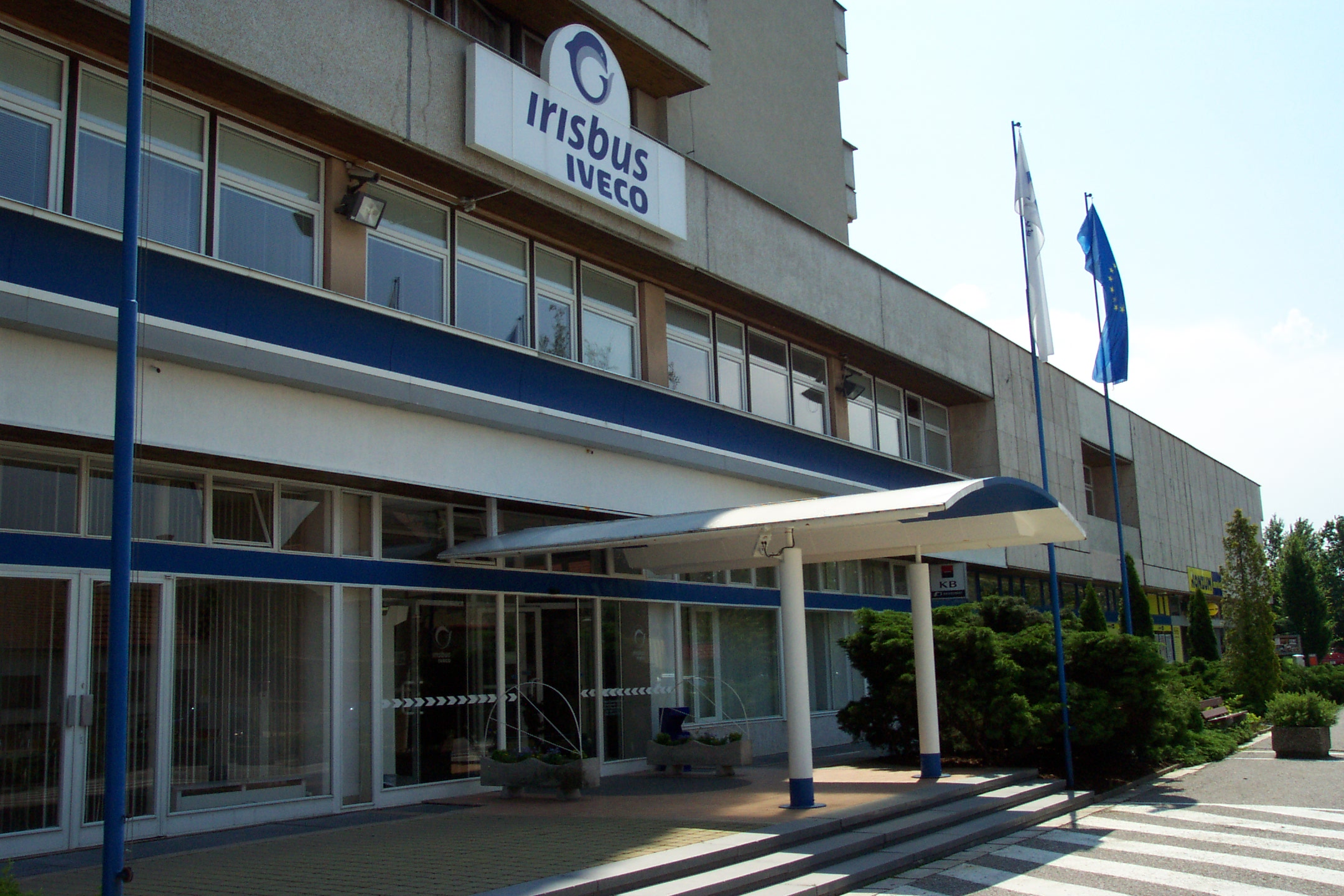
Headquarters in Vysoké Mýto

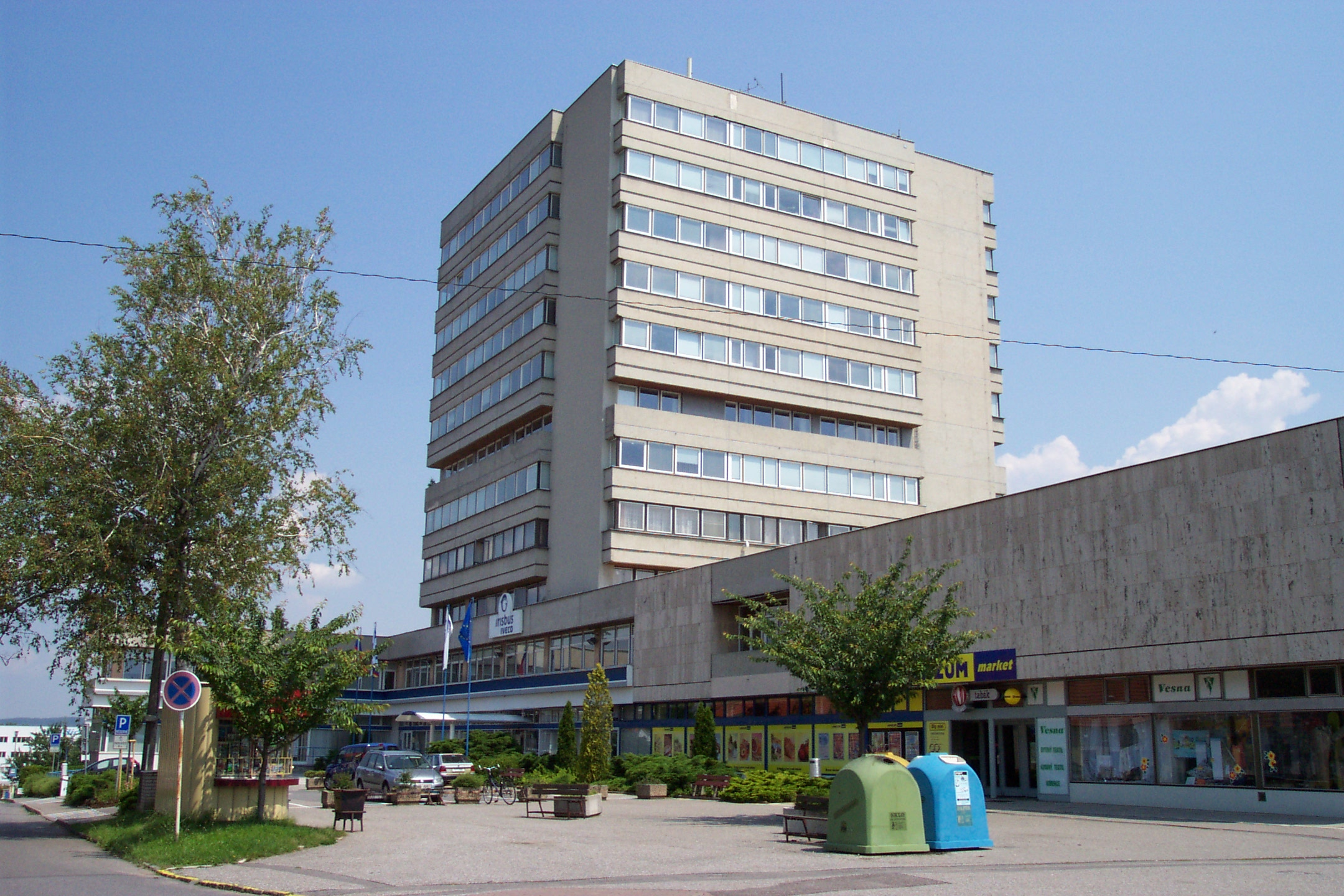
Headquarters in Vysoké Mýto

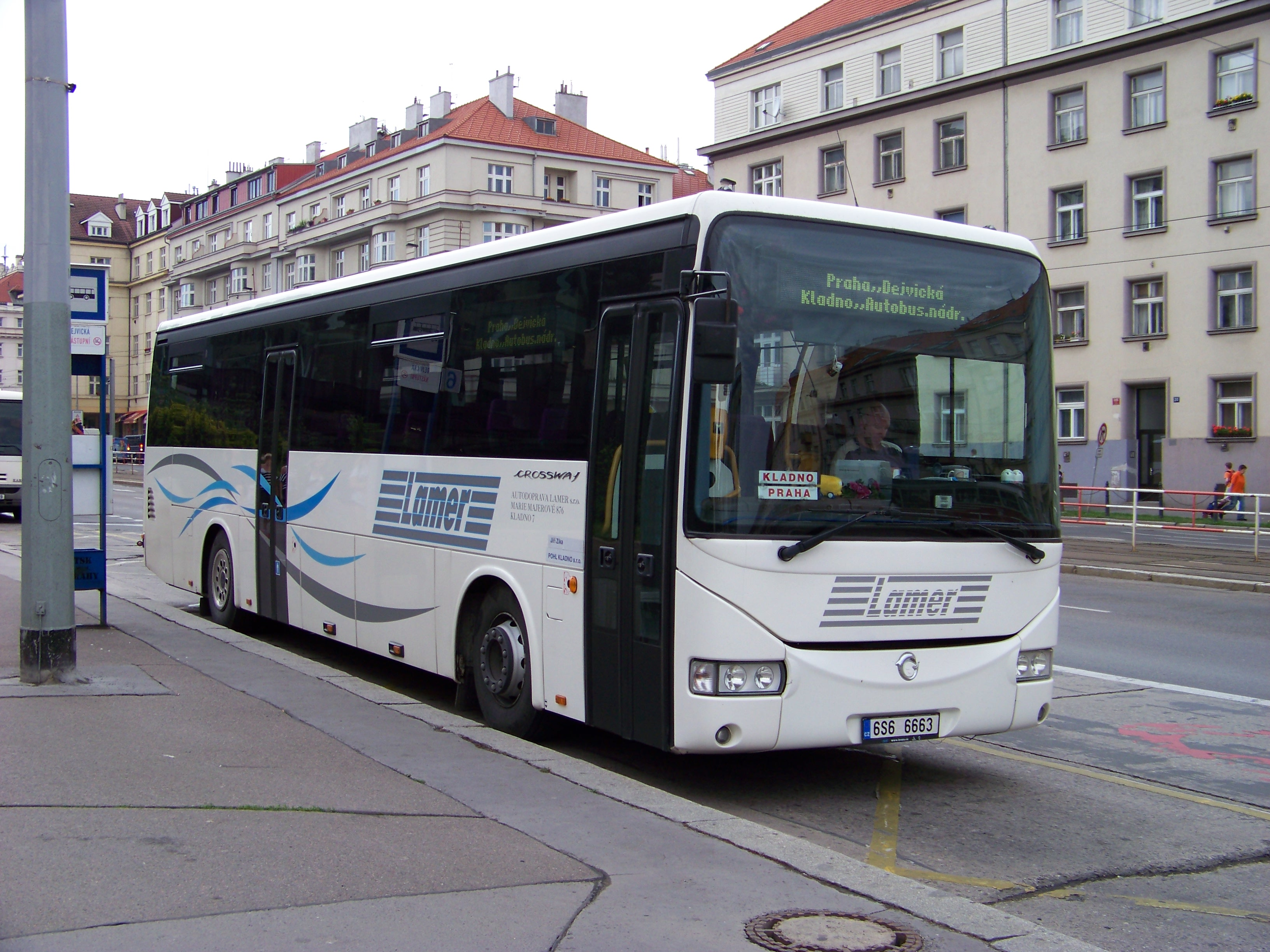
Irisbus Crossway

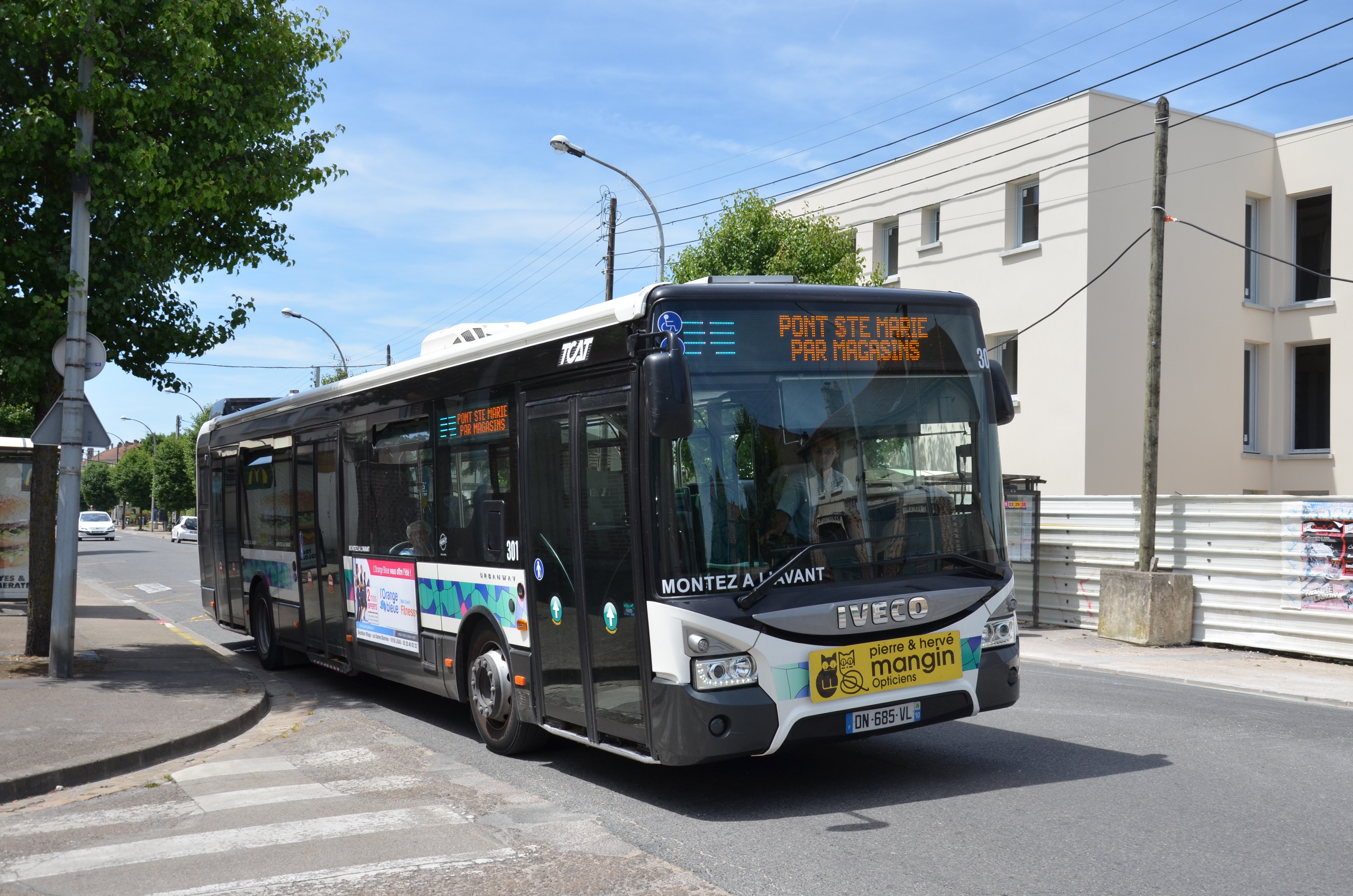
Iveco Urbanway 12
