= Karosa B 831 =

Karosa B831
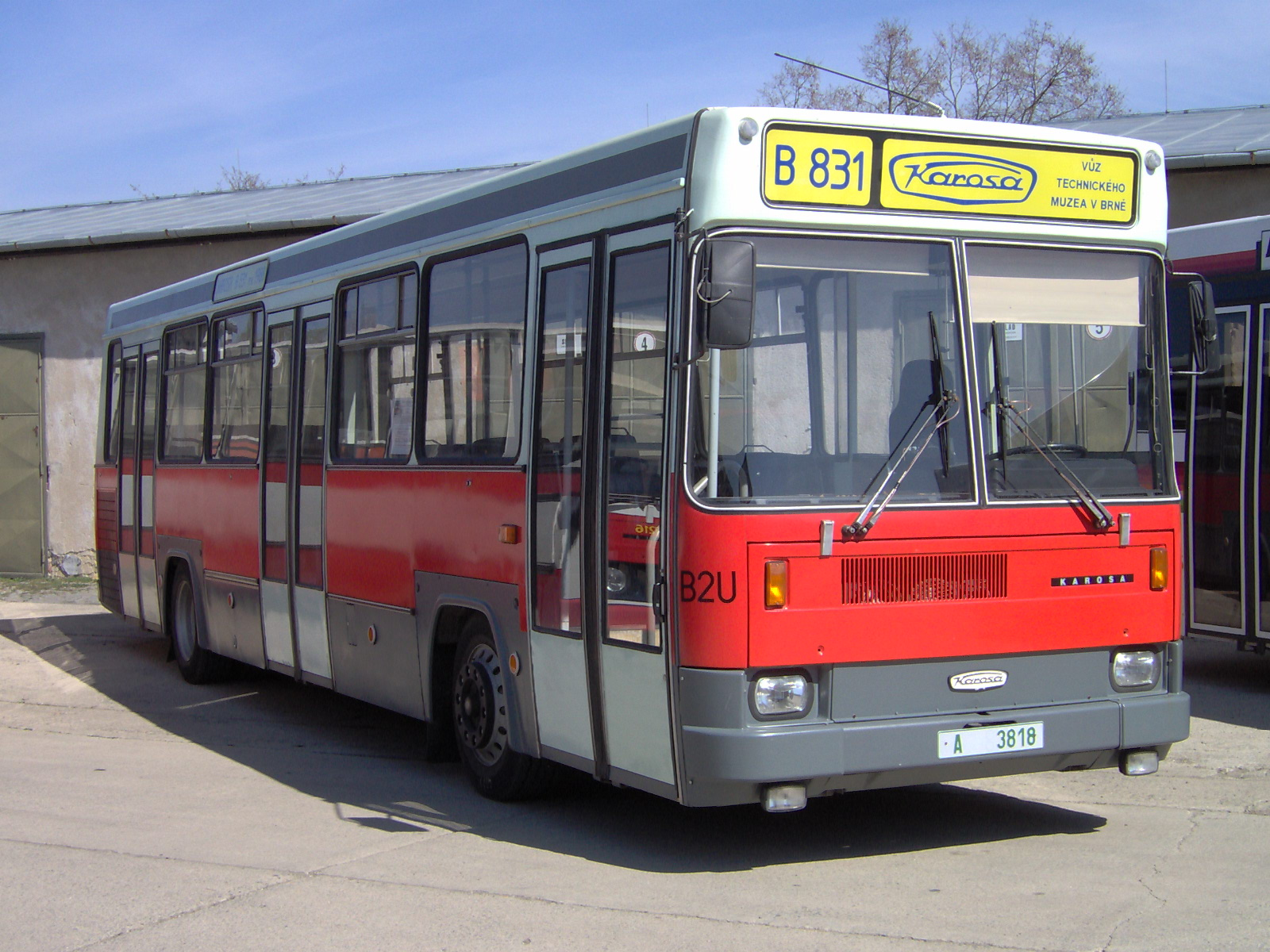
- Historical bus Karosa B 831 in technical muzeum in Brno.

Overview
- Manufacturer: Karosa

Body and chassis
- Doors: 3, air-operated
- Floor type: High-floor
- Chassis: semi-self-supporting with frame

Chronology
- Predecessor: Karosa B 731

The Karosa B 831 was a bus produced by the Czech manufacturer Karosa between 1987 and 1989. It was intended as a successor to the Karosa B 731 and with trolleybus Škoda 17Tr had to be part of unified series of city vehicles. The last known B 831 can be found in the Technical Museum in Brno.

== See also ==
- List of buses
