= Karosa B 932 =

Karosa B932
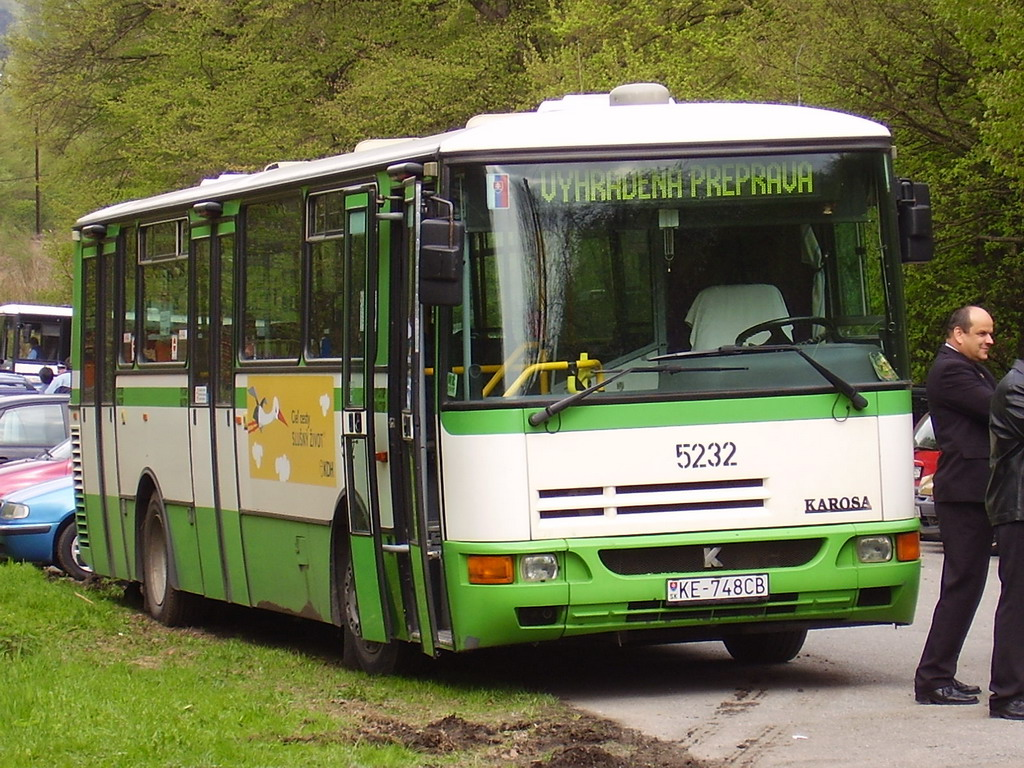
- Karosa B932 in Košice, Slovakia

Overview
- Manufacturer: Karosa

Body and chassis
- Doors: 3, air-operated
- Floor type: High-floor
- Chassis: semi-self-supporting with frame

Powertrain
- Engine: LIAZ ML636N; Renault MIHR 062045
- Capacity: 31 sitting, 63 standing
- Power output: 175 kW (LIAZ); 152-188 kW (Renault MIHR 062045)
- Transmission: Praga 5-speed manual

Dimensions
- Length: 11345 mm
- Width: 2500 mm
- Height: 3165 mm
- Curb weight: 10200 kg

Chronology
- Predecessor: Karosa B 732
- Successor: Karosa B 952

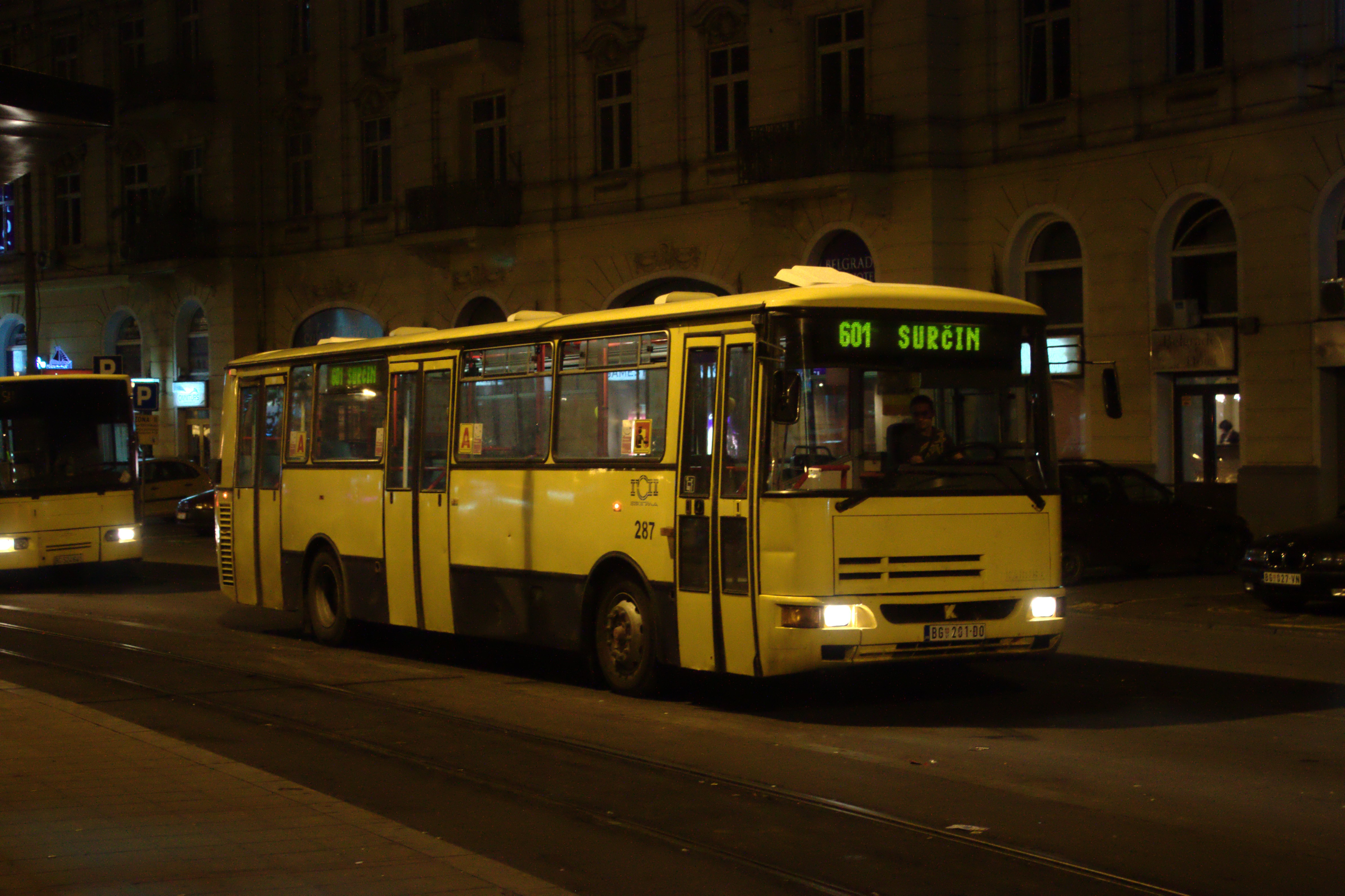
Karosa B 932 E in Belgrade, Serbia

Karosa B 932 is an urban bus produced from 1996 to 2002 by bus manufacturer Karosa from the Czech Republic, belonging to the Karosa 900 series. An upgraded version B932E was launched in 1999. It was succeeded by Karosa B 952 in 2002.

== Overview and history ==
The Karosa B 932 originated as a direct successor to the earlier Karosa B 732 urban bus model. Following the Velvet Revolution of 1989 and the subsequent economic transition to a market-oriented system in the newly formed Czech Republic, Karosa faced declining production volumes due to the collapse of Eastern Bloc markets, currency devaluation, and competition from Western manufacturers. This prompted a strategic redesign to modernize urban bus offerings, emphasizing reliability and adaptability for public transport operators navigating privatization and fiscal constraints.

== Construction features ==
The B 932 is derived from the Karosa B 732 city bus, and also unified with city bus models such as the B 941 and the B 931. The body is semi-self-supporting with frame and engine with manual gearbox in the rear part. The engine drives only the rear axle. The front axle is independent, rear axle is solid. All axles are mounted on air suspension. On the right side are three doors (first are narrower than middle doors). Inside are used plastic Vogelsitze or Fainsa seats. The driver's cab is separated from the rest of the vehicle by a glazed partition. In the middle part is room for a pram or wheelchair.

== Production and operation ==
Production of the B 932 suburban and city buses began at Karosa in 1997, approximately one year after production of the B 931 city buses had started. In 1999, a modified version, the B 932E, was introduced to the market, and production of the original model was discontinued. The last B 932E buses rolled off the Karosa production line in 2002. A total of 319 B 932 and B 932E buses were manufactured.

== Historical vehicles ==
- private collector (rebuilt to CNG, from Jablonec nad Nisou, later FTL Prostějov, SPZ 1M3 2984, operating)

== See also ==
- List of buses
