= Karosa B 732 =

Karosa B732
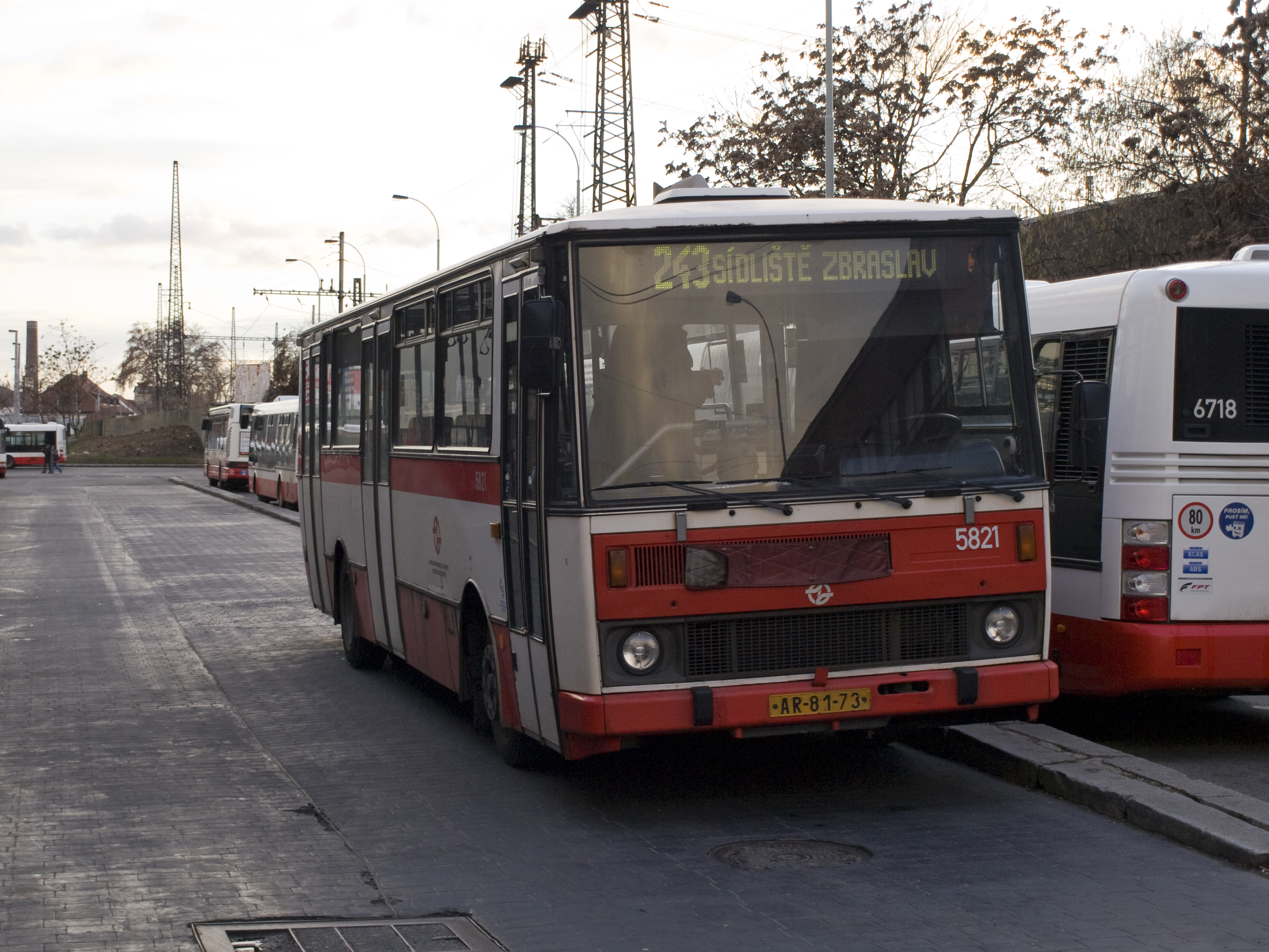
- Karosa B732 no.5821 of Prague transport company, made in 1992, withdrawn in 2012

Overview
- Manufacturer: Karosa

Body and chassis
- Doors: 3, air-operated
- Floor type: High-floor
- Chassis: semi-self-supporting with frame

Powertrain
- Engine: LIAZ ML 635; LIAZ ML 636 N redovu 6 valec turbo Diesel engine
- Power output: 148 kW (198 hp) (LIAZ ML 635); 175 kW (235 hp) (LIAZ ML 636 N)
- Transmission: Praga 5-speed manual

Dimensions
- Length: 11,055 mm (435.2 in)
- Width: 2,500 mm (98.4 in)
- Height: 3,165 mm (124.6 in)
- Curb weight: 9,500 kg (20,900 lb)-10,200 kg (22,500 lb)

Chronology
- Predecessor: Karosa ŠM 11
- Successor: Karosa B 932

Karosa B 732 is an urban bus produced from 1983 to 1997 by bus manufacturer Karosa from Czechoslovakia. It was succeeded by Karosa B 932 in 1997.

== Construction features ==
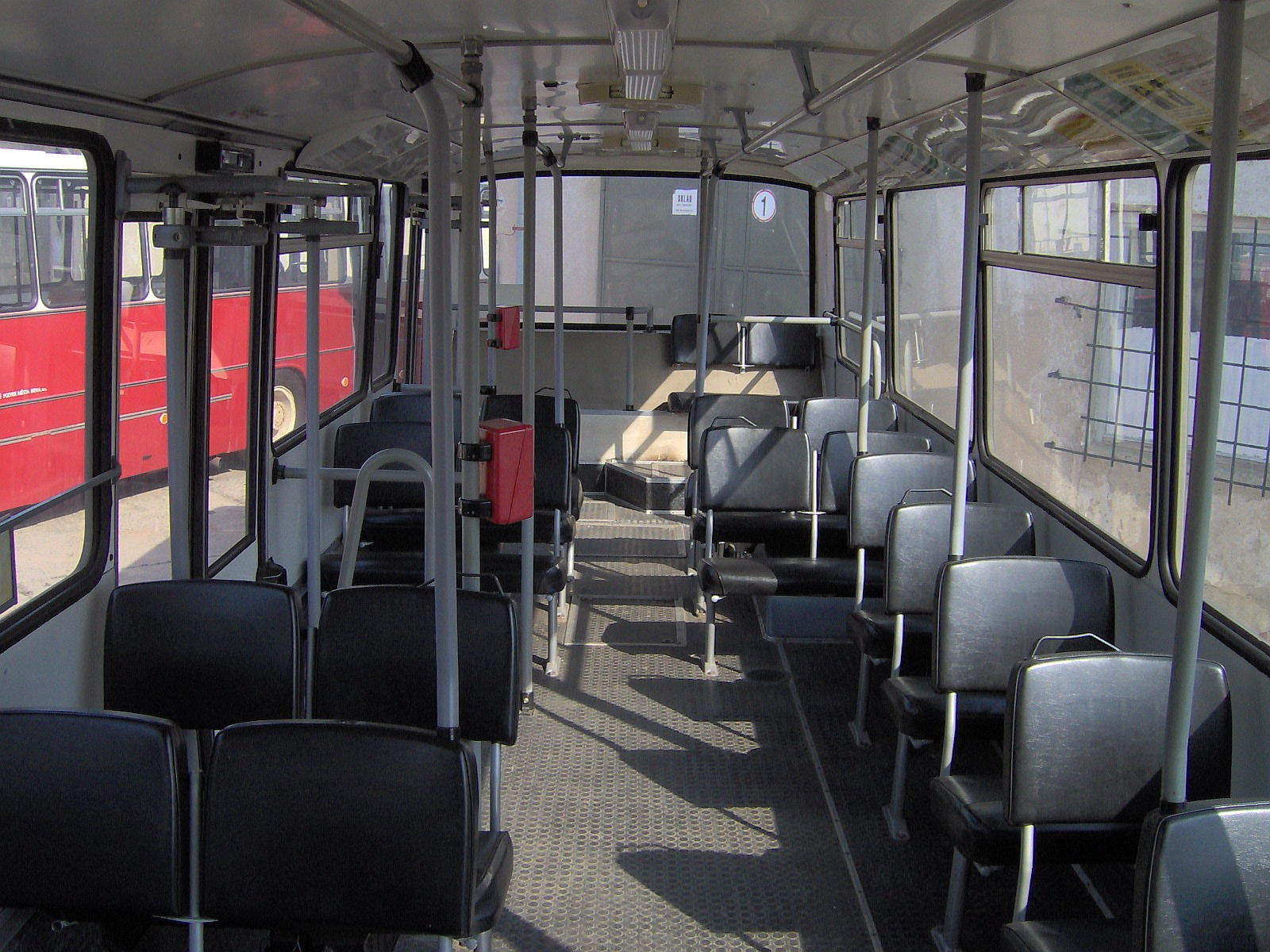
Interior of Karosa B 732

Karosa B 732 is a variant of the Karosa 700 series. The B 732 is derived from the automatic-gearbox B 731 and related to the articulated B 741 and the intercity C 734. The body is semi-self-supporting with frame and engine with manual gearbox in the rear part. The engine drives only the rear axle. The front axle is independent, rear axle is solid. All axles are mounted on Air suspension. On the right side are three doors (first are narrower than middle doors). Inside are used leatherette seats, plastic Vogelsitze or Fainsa seats. The driver's cab is separated from the rest of the vehicle by a glazed partition. In the middle, or in the rear part is room for a pram or wheelchair.

== Production and operation ==
Serial production started in 1983 and continued until 1997. These buses were operated mostly in Czech Republic and Slovakia. Currently, number of Karosa B732 buses is decreasing, due to supply of new Low-floor buses.
Last Karosa B732 in Prague was retired on 19 April 2013.
Last Karosa B732 in Plzeň was retired in May 2014.
Last Karosa B732 in Brno was retired in August 2015.

== Chollima-973 ==
A number of Karosa B732 in Pyongyang were converted to trolleybuses. At least 14 were built, but only 8 trolleybuses remain in service.

== See also ==
- List of buses
