= Karosa C 956 =

Czech intercity bus

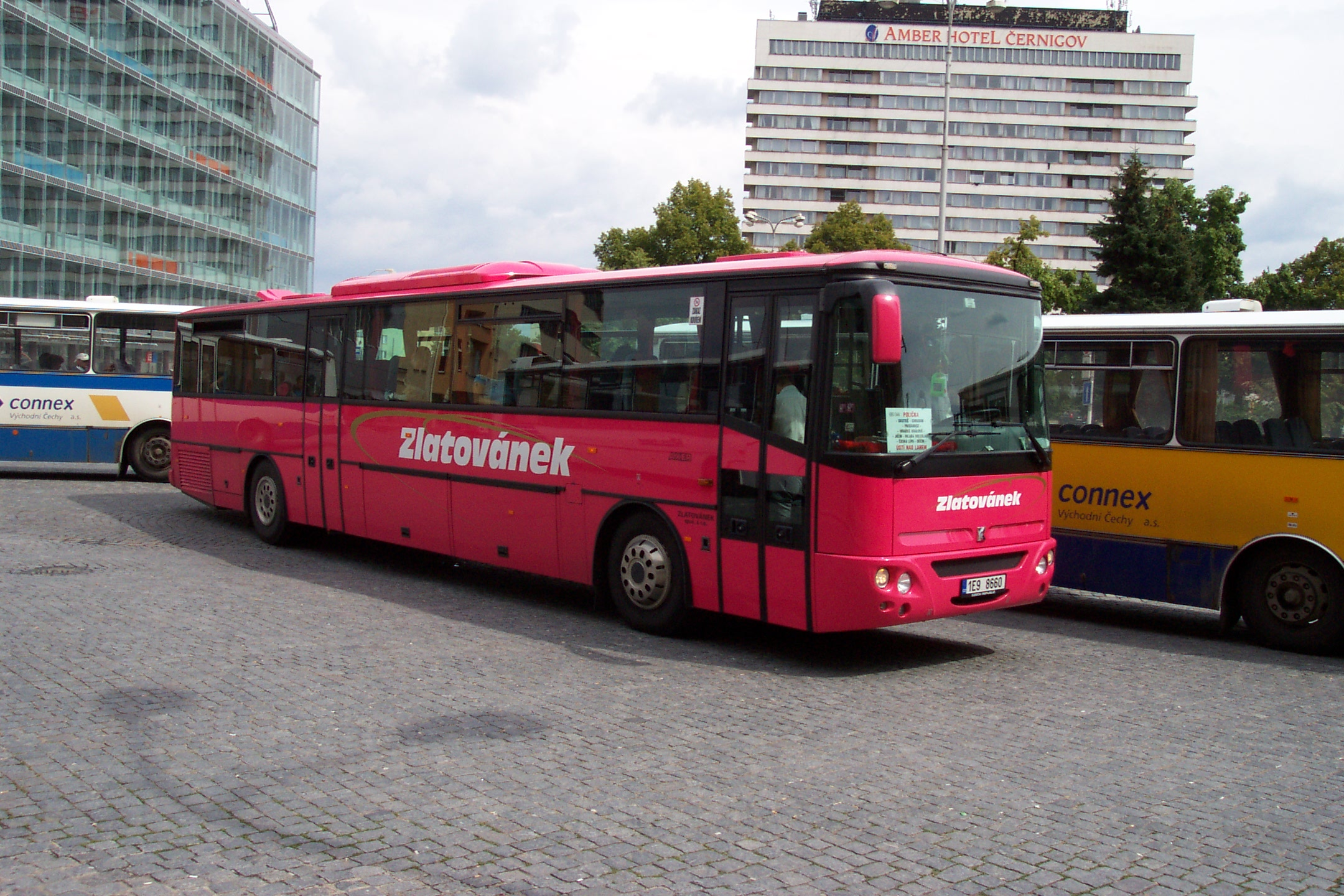
- Karosa C 956 in Hradec Králové, Czech Republic

Overview
- Manufacturer: Karosa

Body and chassis
- Doors: 2, air-operated
- Floor type: High-floor
- Chassis: semi-self-supporting with frame

Powertrain
- Engine: Iveco Cursor F2 B Euro III V6 Diesel engine
- Power output: 228 kW (306 hp)
- Transmission: ZF 6-speed manual

Dimensions
- Length: 11,990 mm (472.0 in) 12,720 mm (500.8 in)
- Width: 2,500 mm (98.4 in)
- Height: 3,165 mm (124.6 in)
- Curb weight: 12,000 kg (26,000 lb)

Chronology
- Predecessor: Karosa C 935

Karosa C 956 is an intercity bus produced from 2002 to 2006 by bus manufacturer Karosa from the Czech Republic. In 2003 an upgraded version, C 956 E, was launched.

== Construction features ==
Karosa C 956 is model of Karosa 900 series. C 956 is unified with city bus models such as B 952 and B 961. Body was assembled to the skeleton, which has undergone a dip stage, sheets were galvanized and painted and then to have it installed additional components. Body is semi-self-supporting with frame and engine with manual gearbox is placed in the rear part. Only rear axle is propulsed. Front and rear axles are solid. All axles are mounted on air suspension. On the right side are two doors. Inside are used cloth seats. Drivers cab is not separated from the rest of the vehicle.

The front face of the vehicle, unlike the C 955 has modified slightly different plastic bumper with round lights. The rear face is identical to C 955.

C 956 provides high, folding padded seat which are spaced 2 + 2 with the central aisle and placed on an elevated landing. The latest models of AXER have belts on all seats and three-point seatbelts. Previous versions had these extras menu option, the mandatory two-point belts fitted with only the front seats (and also the middle seat in the last row and double seats at the back door). According to customer requirements, the bus is equipped with either only heating or air conditioning, on-demand of customers may be placed inside coffee maker, TV with video or DVD player or refrigerator. The driver has a heated seat with three-point seat belt. The luggage compartment below the floor between the axles has a volume of 6.5 m³ (version 12M) or 7.65 m³ (version 12.8). The interesting thing is that the bus uses the entire front headlights originally developed in 1988 for BMW cars.

== Production and operation ==
In 2002 started serial production, which continued until 2006. Model C 956 is a sort between the type of the intercity C 954 and luxury touring LC 956. It is designed for a long lines or shorter trips.

== Historical vehicles ==
Any historical vehicle was not saved yet.

== See also ==
- List of buses
