= Karosa Récréo =

Czech School bus

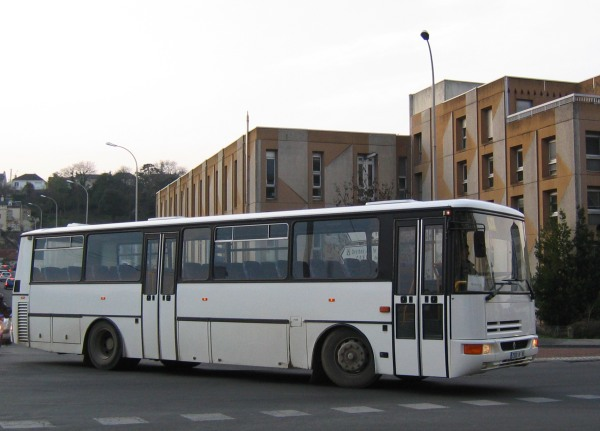
- Karosa Récréo in France

Overview
- Manufacturer: Karosa

Body and chassis
- Doors: 2, air-operated
- Floor type: High-floor
- Chassis: semi-self-supporting with frame

Powertrain
- Engine: Renault MIHR 062045 V6 Diesel engine Iveco F2B V6 Diesel engine
- Power output: 186 kW (249 hp) (Renault); 228 kW (306 hp) (Iveco)
- Transmission: ZF 6-speed manual

Dimensions
- Length: 11,320 mm (445.7 in) 11,990 mm (472.0 in) 12,720 mm (500.8 in)
- Width: 2,500 mm (98.4 in)
- Height: 3,165 mm (124.6 in)
- Curb weight: 11,050 kg (24,360 lb)-11,400 kg (25,100 lb)

Chronology
- Successor: Irisbus Récréo

Karosa Récréo (previously known as Renault Récréo or Irisbus Récréo) is special school version of intercity buses Karosa C 935 and C 955. Récréo was manufactured by the company Karosa, Vysoké Mýto from 1997 to 2007.

== Construction features ==
Structurally Récréo was indistinguishable with C 935 and C 955. The original version, C 935 Récréo is two axle bus with semi-self supporting body of panel construction. Engine and manual transmission are stored behind the rear axle, in the area of the rear panel. On the right side are two double hinged doors, the first before front axle and second before rear axle. Since type C 935 Récréo differs mainly with different type of seats for passengers, lack of storage racks above the seats and other details. Vehicle length is approximately 11.3 m, almost identical to the C 935.

After completion of a type C 935 and start of production of the C 955, these buses were manufactured in the school version under the name Récréo. Structurally, the C 955 Récréo is very similar to its predecessor. Body panels are not prepared, but it was assembled into the shell, which then passed dip stage, painted and sheeting. It differs also slightly with modified front and flat (instead of bulging) rear face. Wheelbase was extended so that such vehicles are also longer (length 12 m is equal to C 955). At the same time production began and capacitive versions with a length of 12.7 meters.

== Production and operation ==
They were produced between 1997 and 2007, first as a variant C 935, then since 2001 as a modification of C 955. The vast majority of these buses were designed to export especially to France. Several thousand of buses Récréo was made.

Before the end of the production of 900 series introduced Irisbus new model Recreo, which was derived from the model Crossway.

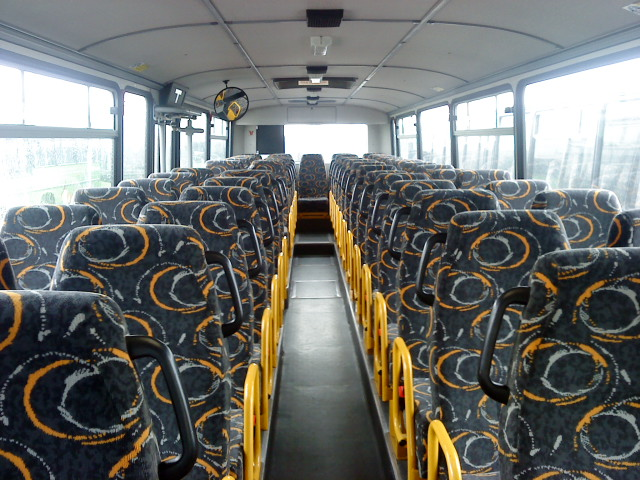
Interior

== Historical vehicles ==
not any

== See also ==
- List of buses
