= Karosa LC 936 =

Type of Czech long-distance coach

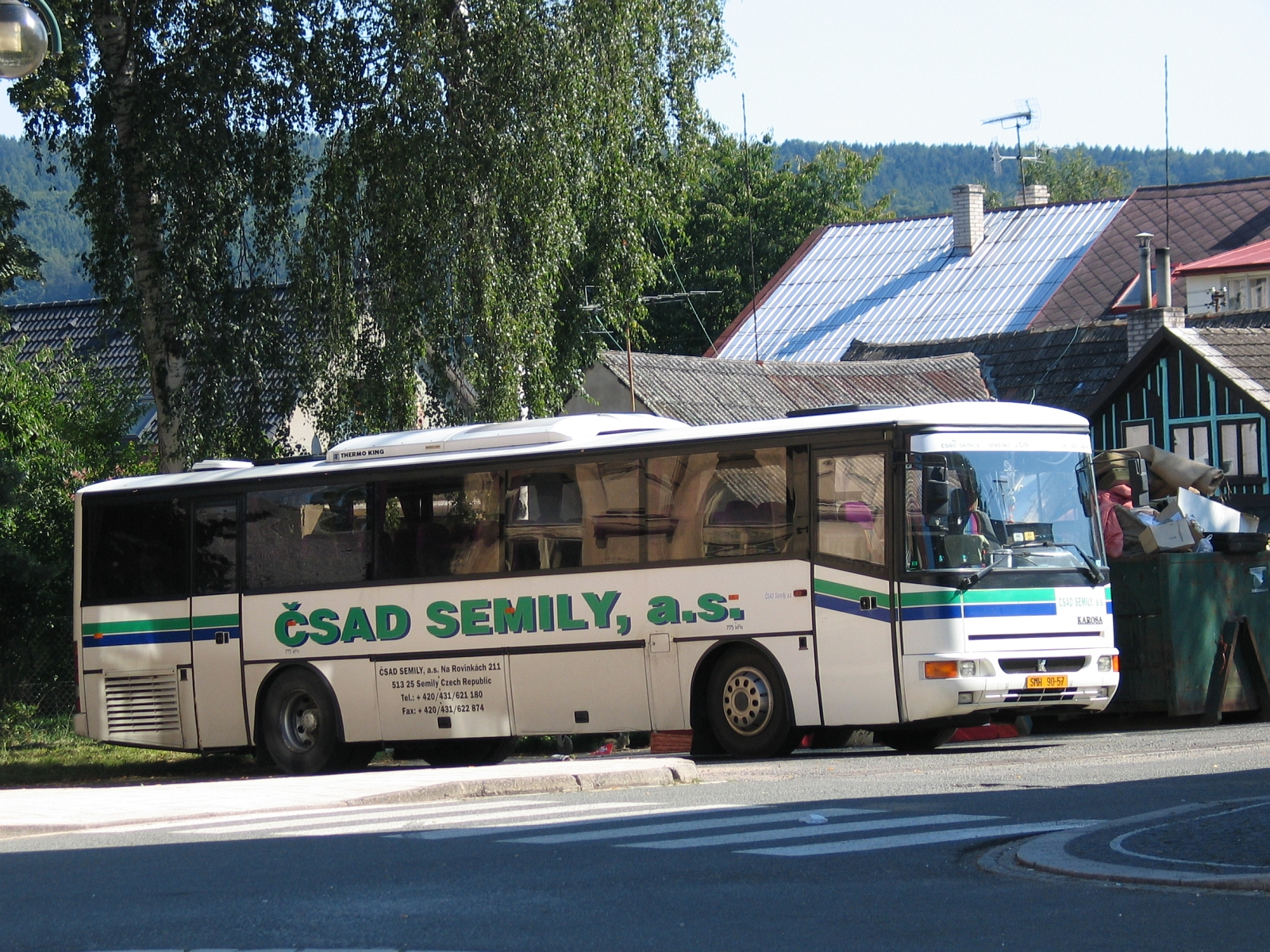
- Karosa LC 936 in Lázně Bělohrad, Czech Republic

Overview
- Manufacturer: Karosa

Body and chassis
- Doors: 2, air-operated
- Floor type: High-floor
- Chassis: semi-self-supporting with frame

Powertrain
- Engine: Renault MIHR 062045
- Power output: 186-217 kW
- Transmission: Praga 8-speed manual

Dimensions
- Length: 11320 mm
- Width: 2500 mm
- Height: 3165 mm
- Curb weight: 11000-12000 kg

Chronology
- Predecessor: Karosa LC 736
- Successor: Karosa LC 956

Karosa LC 936 is a long-distance coach produced from 1996 to 2002 by bus manufacturer Karosa from the Czech Republic. In 1999 modernised versions LC 936 E and LC 936 XE were introduced. It was succeeded by Karosa LC 956 in 2002.

== Construction features ==
Karosa LC 936 is a model of Karosa 900 series. LC 936 is unified with intercity bus models such as C 934 and B 932. Body is semi-self-supporting with frame and engine with manual gearbox is placed in the rear part. Only rear axle is propulsed. Front axle is independent, rear axle is solid. All axles are mounted on air suspension. On the right side are two doors. Inside are used high padded seats. Driver's cab is not separated from the rest of the vehicle.

== Production and operation ==
Serial production stated in 1996 and continued until 2002. Since 1999 were buses produced only in modernised version LC 936 E and LC 936 XE.

Currently, the number of Karosa LC 936 buses is decreasing, due to high age of buses.

== Historical vehicles ==
Any historical vehicle was not saved yet.

== See also ==
- List of buses
