= Karosa LC 757 =

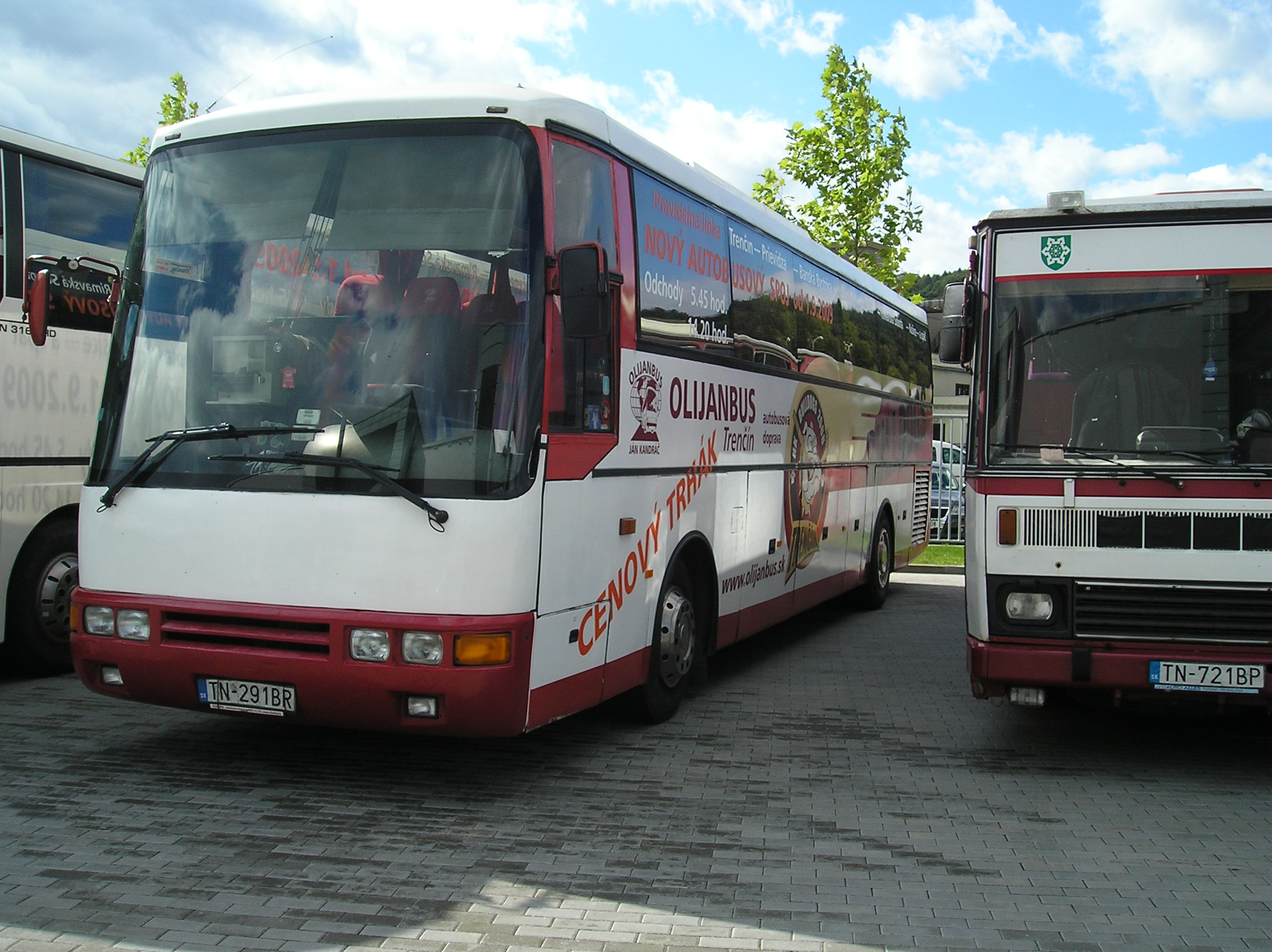

Overview
- Manufacturer: Karosa

Body and chassis
- Doors: 2, air-operated
- Floor type: High-floor
- Chassis: semi-self-supporting with frame

Powertrain
- Engine: Cummins LTAA 10-325.10 diesel
- Capacity: 41–47 sitting
- Power output: 242 kW
- Transmission: GEAR (license ZF) 6-speed manual

Dimensions
- Length: 11 990 mm
- Width: 2500 mm
- Height: 3265 mm
- Curb weight: 13200 kg

Chronology
- Successor: Karosa LC 957

Karosa LC 757 is a long-distance coach produced by bus manufacturer Karosa from the Czech Republic, produced from 1992 to 1996. It was succeeded by Karosa LC 957 in 1996.

== Construction features ==
Karosa LC 757 is model of Karosa 700 series. LC 757 is unified with intercity bus models such as C 734 and B 732, but has completely different design. The body is semi-self-supporting with frame; the engine with manual gearbox is placed in the rear. Only rear axle is propulsed. Front axle is independent, rear axle is solid. All axles are mounted on air suspension. On the right side are two doors. Inside are used high padded seats. The driver's cab is not separated from the rest of the vehicle.

== Production and operation ==
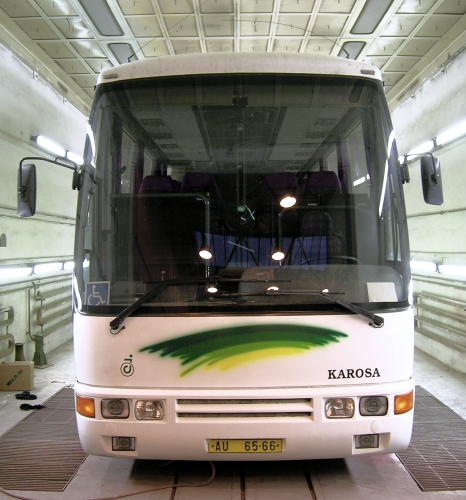
Karosa LC 757 for Jedlička's Institute

Bus LC 757 was created as an extended version of the bus LC 737, which was made in the early 90s in only one prototype. Production of type LC 757 ran from 1992 to 1996, and then was replaced by Karosa LC 957, whose designation was also HD 12.

LC 757 was produced off basis; Each bus was in fact made by the customer. In the years 1992 to 1996 was made 76 buses.

One of the buses LC 757 (made in the year 1995) was modified according to the requirements Jedlička's Institute in Prague for the transport of handicapped citizens. The vehicle can transport 34 passengers + driver, the 16 passengers + 8 wheelchairs + driver. In front of them are transported passengers, the rear space serves as a "technological": There is a chemical toilet, washbasin, changing tables, kitchen and shower. For the hot water is used electric boiler. To facilitate the onset of the handicapped was installed in a vehicle electric lift.

== See also ==
- List of buses
