= Karosa LC 937 =

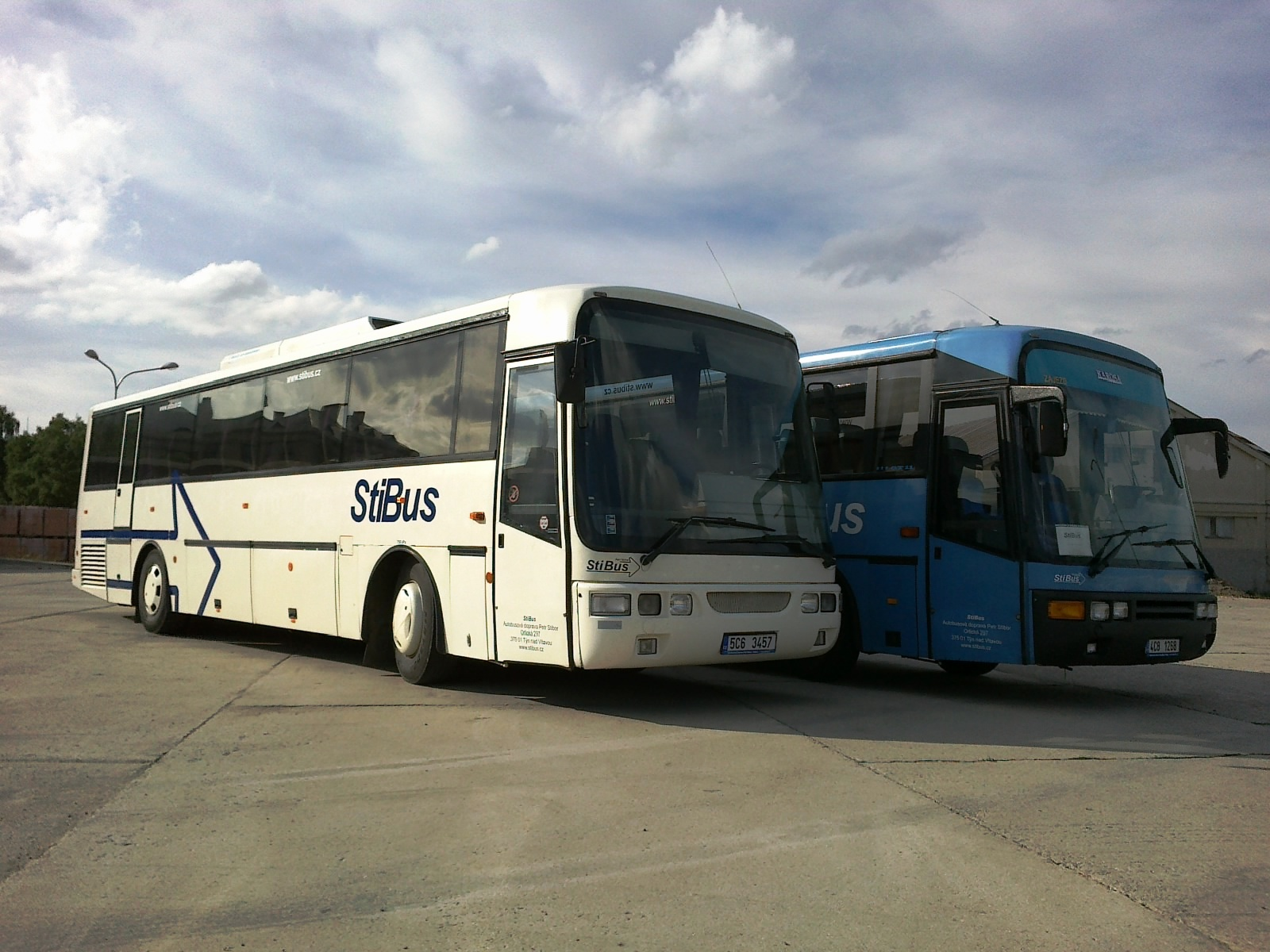

Overview
- Manufacturer: Karosa

Body and chassis
- Doors: 2, air-operated
- Floor type: High-floor
- Chassis: semi-self-supporting with frame

Powertrain
- Engine: LIAZ M 1.2 A ML 637 N V6 Diesel
- Capacity: 46 sitting
- Power output: 190 kW
- Transmission: GEAR (license ZF) 6-speed manual

Dimensions
- Length: 11490 mm
- Width: 2500 mm
- Height: 3265 mm
- Curb weight: 11 950 kg

Chronology
- Predecessor: Karosa LC 737

Karosa LC 937 (known as Karosa GT 11) is a long-distance coach produced by bus manufacturer Karosa from the Czech Republic, produced from 1994 to 1996.

== Construction features ==
Karosa LC 937 is a model of Karosa 900 series. LC 937 is unified with intercity bus models such as C 934 and B 932, but has different design. Its body is semi-self-supporting with frame and engine; manual gearbox is placed in the rear. Only the rear axle is propulsed. Front axle is independent, rear axle is solid. All axles are mounted on air suspension. On the right side are two doors. Inside are used high padded seats. Driver's cab is not separated from the rest of the vehicle.

== Production and operation ==
In the years 1994 to 1996 was made only 16 buses.

== Historical vehicles ==
empty

== See also ==
- List of buses
