= Karosa LC 957 =

Karosa LC 957 (HD 12)
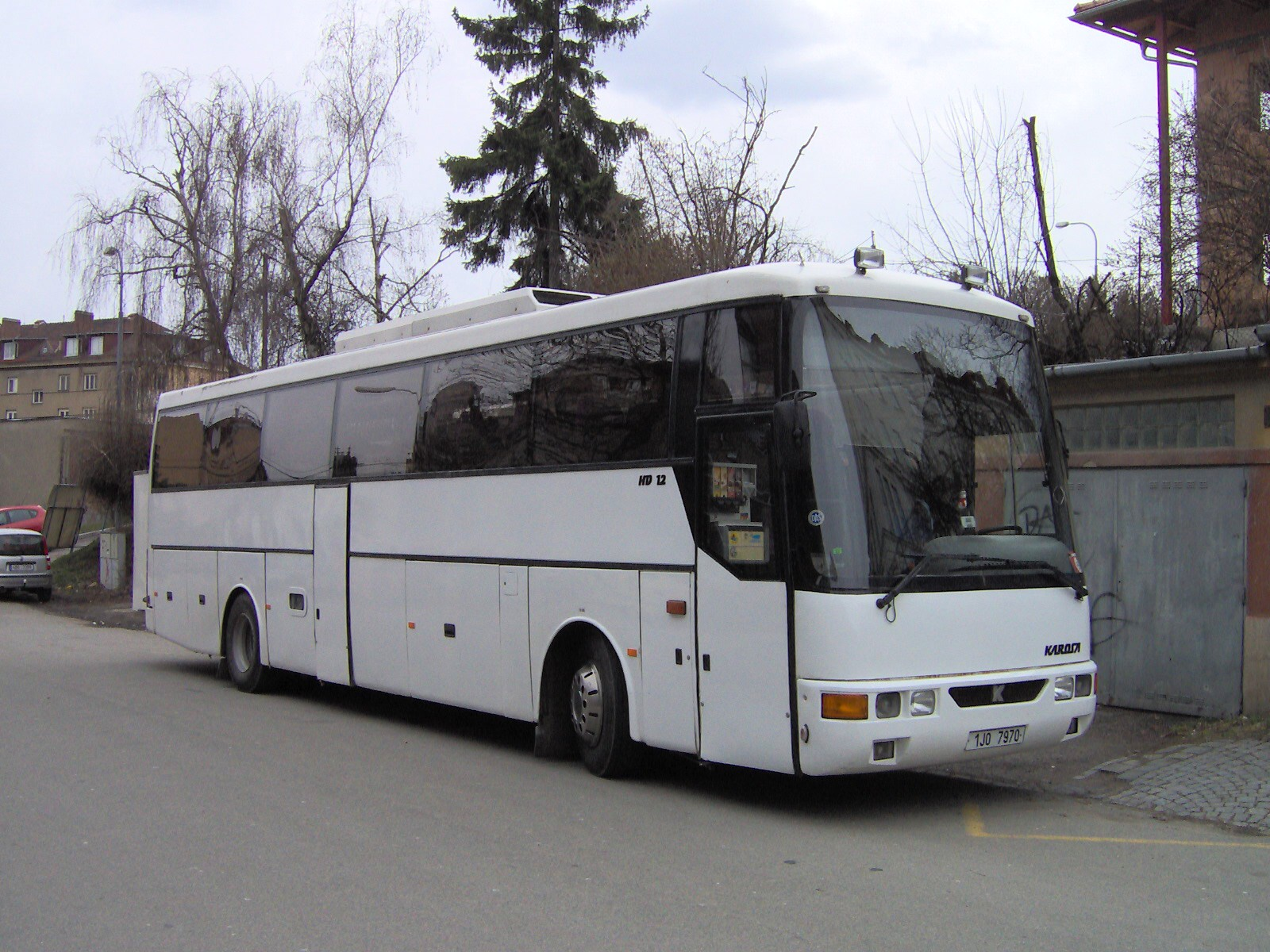
- Karosa LC 957 in Brno, Czech Republic

Overview
- Manufacturer: Karosa

Body and chassis
- Doors: 2, air-operated
- Floor type: High-floor
- Chassis: semi-self-supporting with frame

Powertrain
- Engine: Renault MIDR 062045 M41 diesel
- Capacity: 41–47 sitting
- Power output: 250 kW
- Transmission: ZF 8-speed manual

Dimensions
- Length: 12 metres (39 ft)
- Width: 2.5 metres (8 ft 2 in)
- Height: 3.27 metres (10 ft 9 in)
- Curb weight: 13200 kg

Chronology
- Predecessor: Karosa LC 757

Karosa LC 957 (known as HD 12) is a long-distance coach produced by bus manufacturer Karosa from the Czech Republic, produced from 1997 to 1999.

== Construction features ==
Karosa LC 957 is a model of Karosa 900 series. LC 957 is unified with intercity bus models such as C 934 and B 932, but has different design. The body is semi-self-supporting with frame; the engine with manual gearbox is placed in the rear. Only rear axle is propulsed. Front axle is independent, rear axle is solid. All axles are mounted on air suspension. The model has two doors on the right side and high padded seats. The driver's cab is not separated from the rest of the vehicle.

== Production and operation ==
In the years 1997 to 1999 only 19 buses were manufactured.

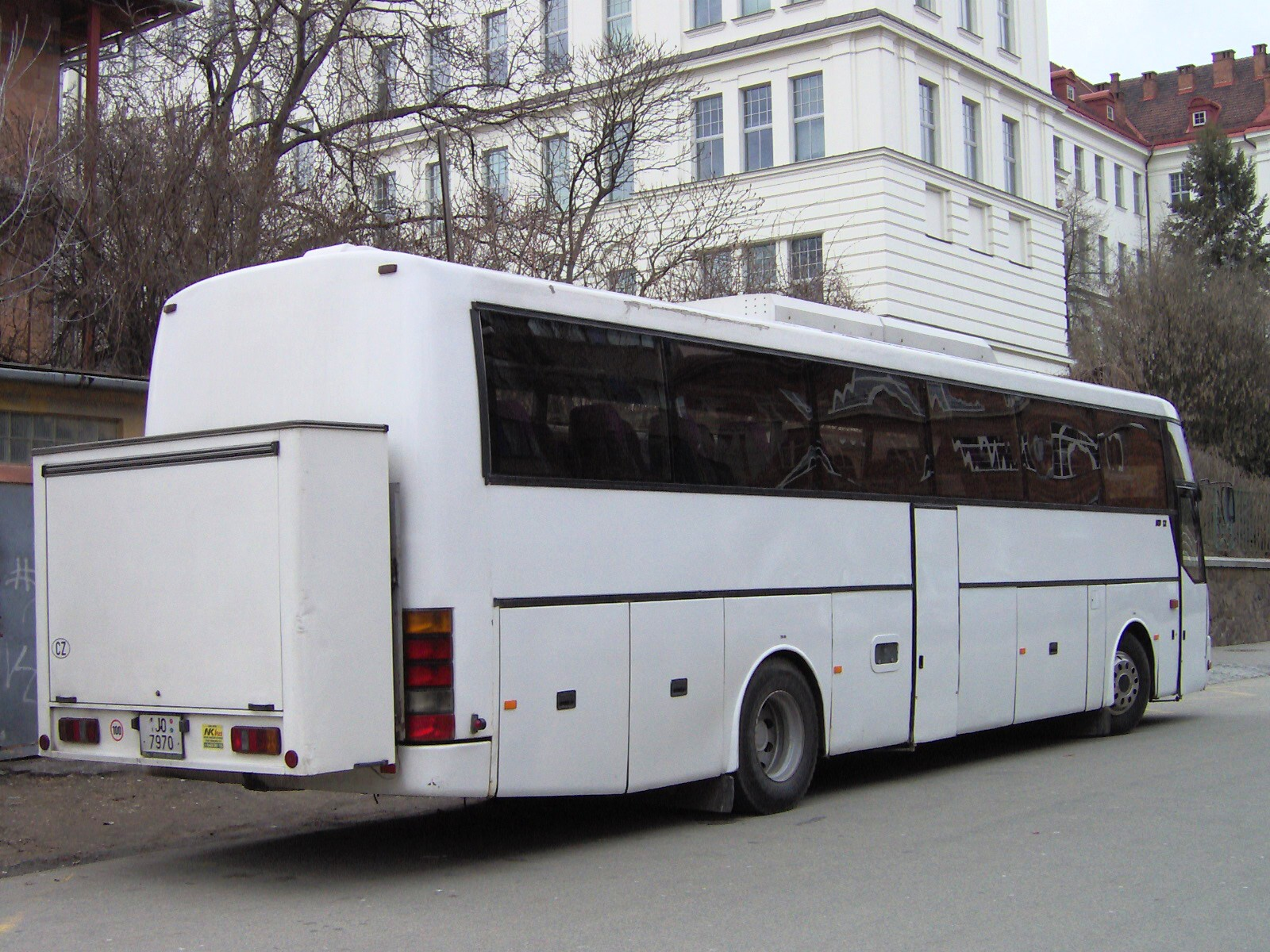
Rear view with skibox

== See also ==
- List of buses
