= Sakay =

Sakay may refer to:

- Sakay (film), a 1993 Filipino historical drama film
- Sakay River, in Madagascar
- Ankadinondry Sakay, anciently Babetville, a town and commune in Madagascar
- Macario Sakay (1878–1907), Filipino general
- Sakay.ph, a public transport trip planning website and app for Metro Manila and surrounding areas

== See also ==
- Sakaya (disambiguation)
