= Iveco Crossway =

Type of Urban/Intercity bus

Iveco Bus Crossway
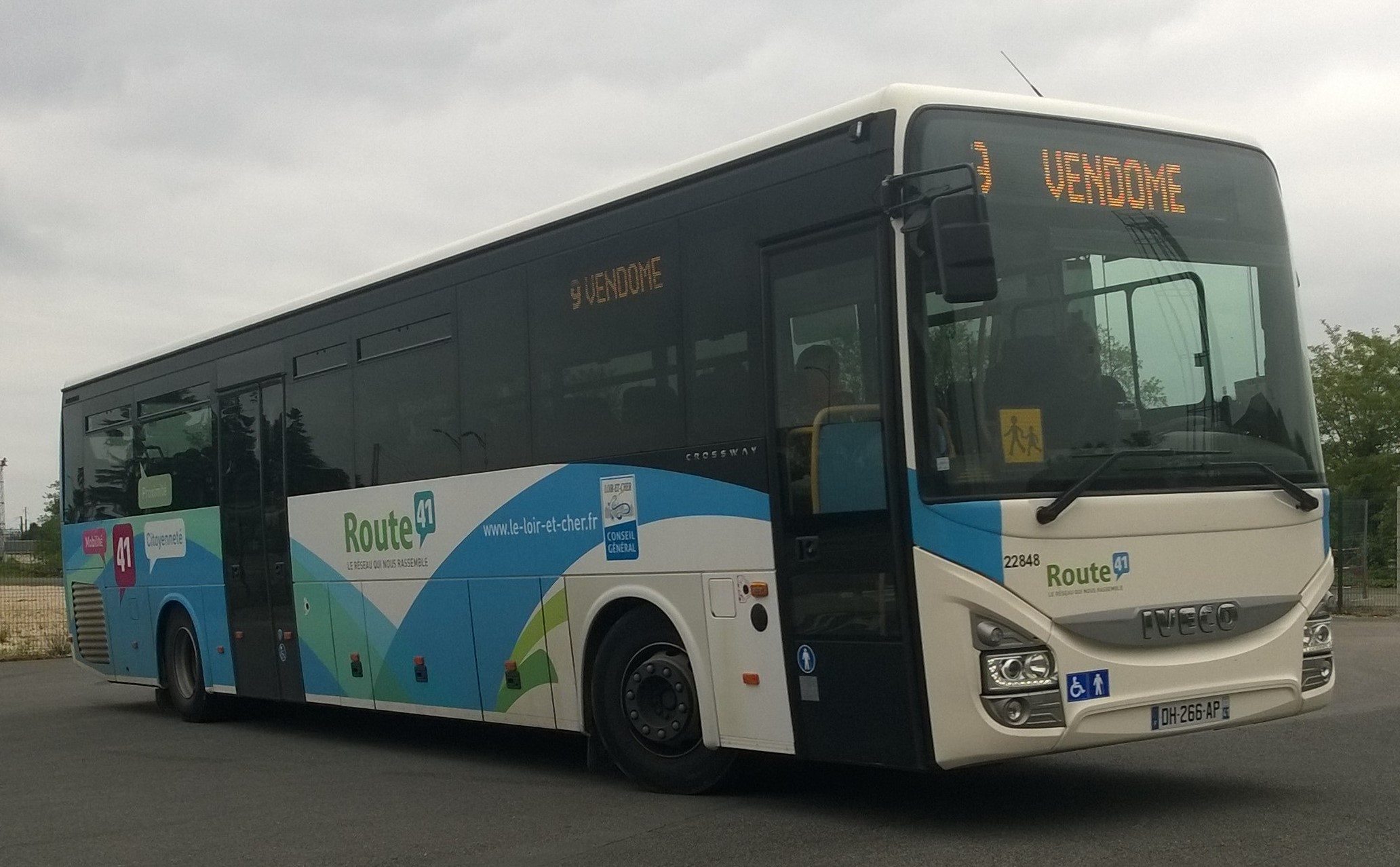
- Iveco Bus Crossway on Route 41

Overview
- Manufacturer: Irisbus (2006–2013); Iveco Bus (2013–present)
- Also called: Irisbus Crossway; Iveco Crossway
- Production: 2006–present
- Assembly: Czech Republic: Vysoké Mýto; Turkey: Sakarya

Body and chassis
- Body style: Single-deck bus
- Doors: 2 or 3
- Floor type: Step entrance; Low entry

Powertrain
- Engine: 5.9 L Iveco Tector 6; 6.7 L Iveco Tector 7; 7.8 L Iveco Cursor 8; 8.7 L Iveco Cursor 9
- Electric motor: 290 kW peak (Elec versions)

Dimensions
- Length: 10.6–14.5 m (34.8–47.6 ft) (nominal, depending on version)
- Width: 2.55 m (8 ft 4 in)

The Iveco Crossway, originally marketed as the Irisbus Crossway, is a family of single-deck buses introduced in 2006. It is manufactured primarily in Vysoké Mýto, Czech Republic, and has been sold under the Iveco Bus brand since 2013.

== Features ==
Body is semi-self-supporting with frame and engine with manual gearbox and automatic gearbox placed to the rear ('pusher bus'). Only rear axle is powered. All axles use air suspension. On the right side are two or three doors. Interior seating is cloth. The driver's cab is integral with the rest of the vehicle.

== Production and operation ==
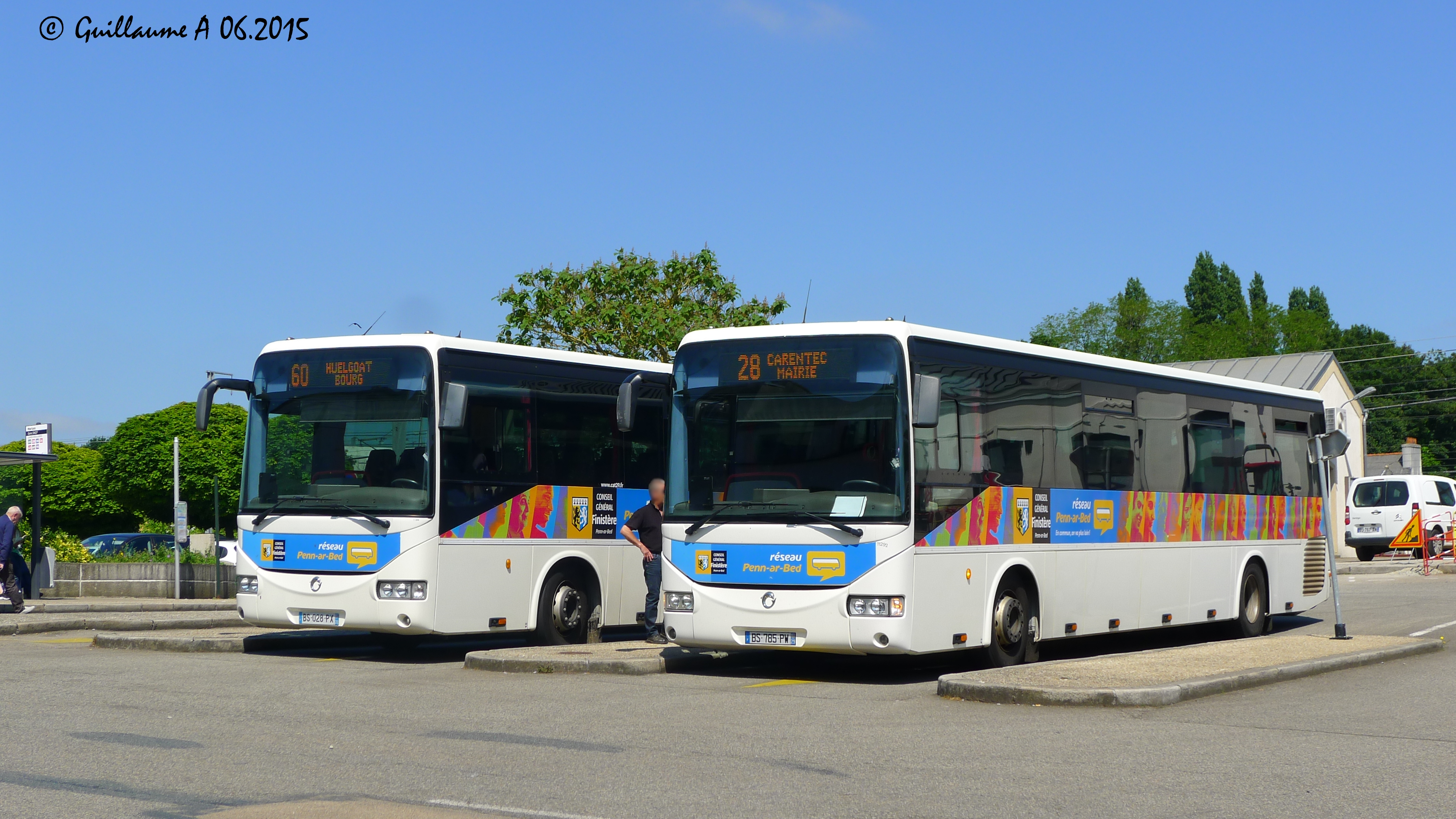
Crossway

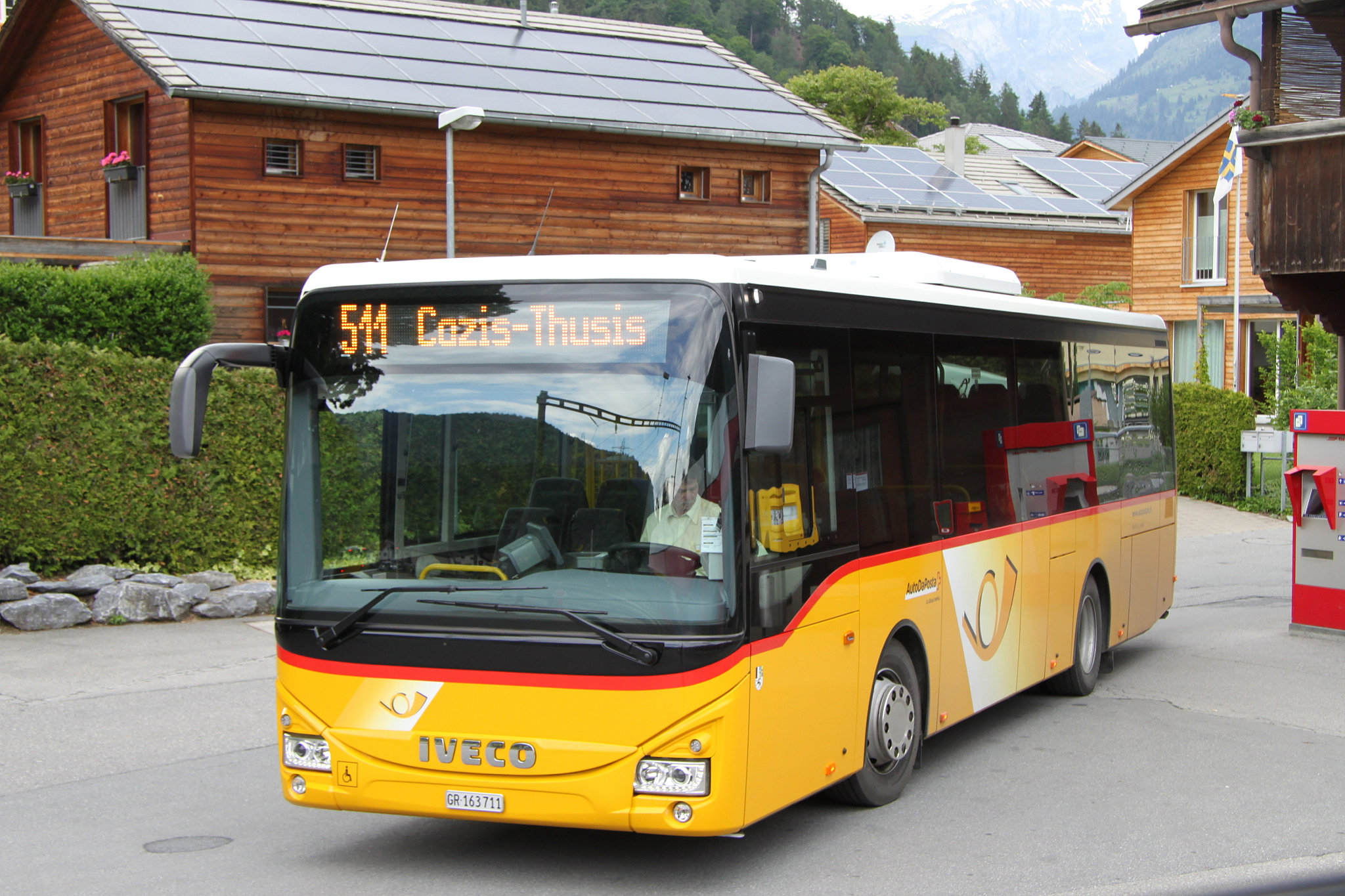
Facelifted Crossway

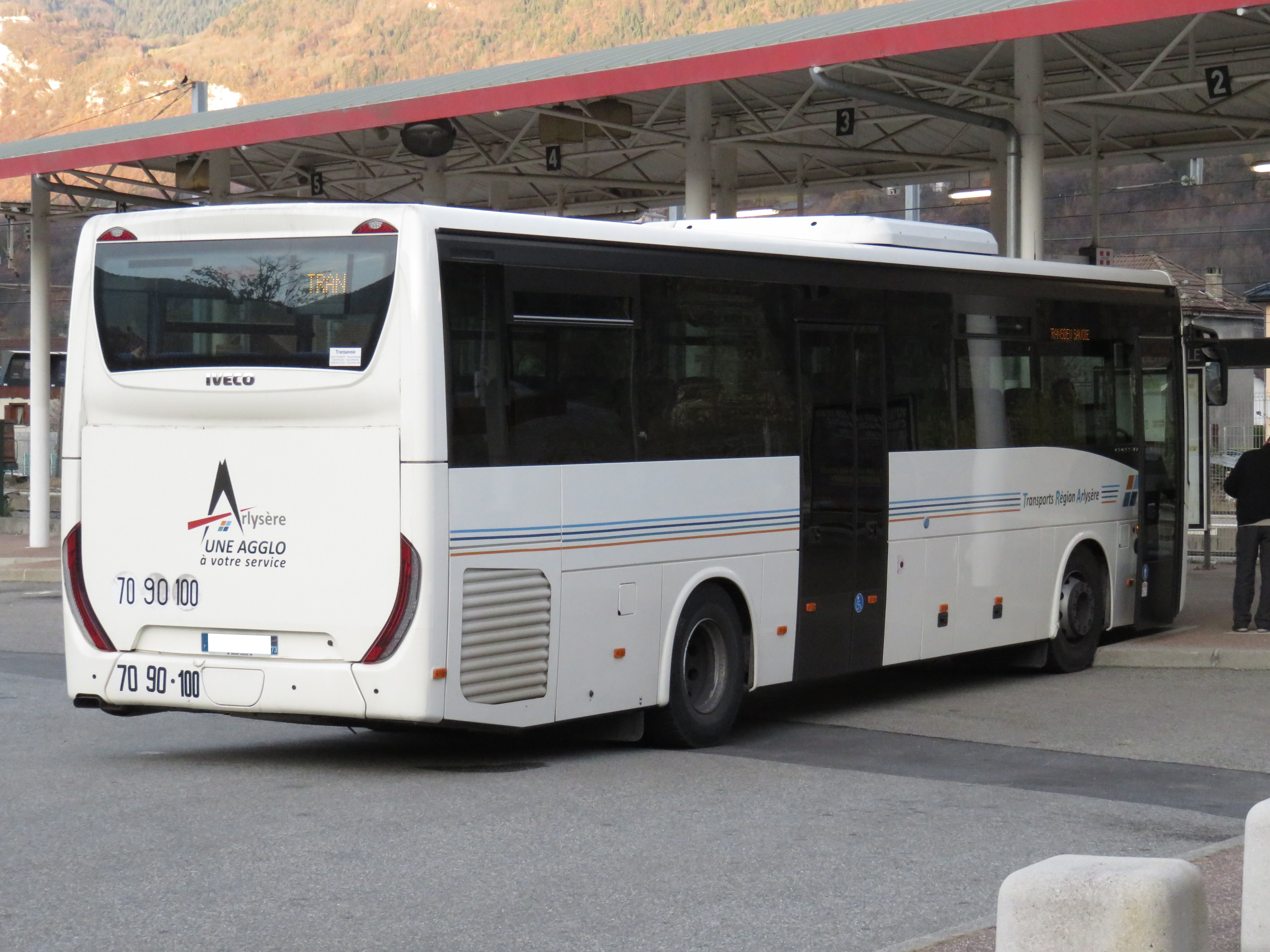
Crossway rear

=== Irisbus Crossway (2006–2013) ===
The Crossway was introduced at the Autotec exhibition in Brno in June 2006. Developed by an international team led by Czech engineers, it was manufactured at Vysoké Mýto as part of the replacement for the Karosa 900 series.

The original range comprised lengths of 10.6, 12 and 12.8 metres. It was offered alongside the Irisbus Arway, which had a higher level of interior equipment.

The Crossway Low Entry (LE) was introduced in 2007 in 12- and 12.8-metre versions, with a low-floor front section and a raised rear section. A shorter version, marketed as the Crossway LE 10.8, was presented in 2011.

=== Iveco Crossway (2013–present) ===
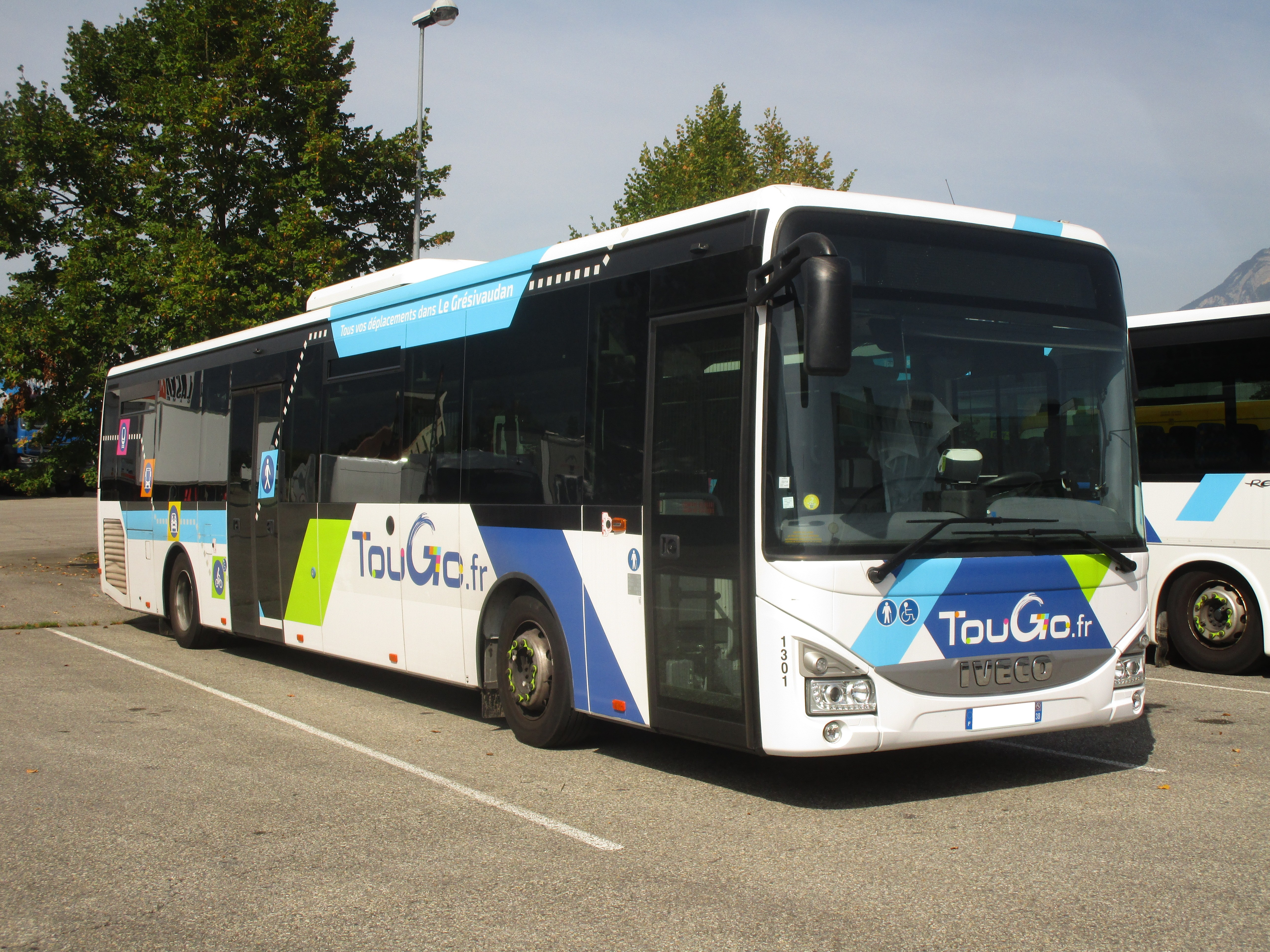
Crossway LE

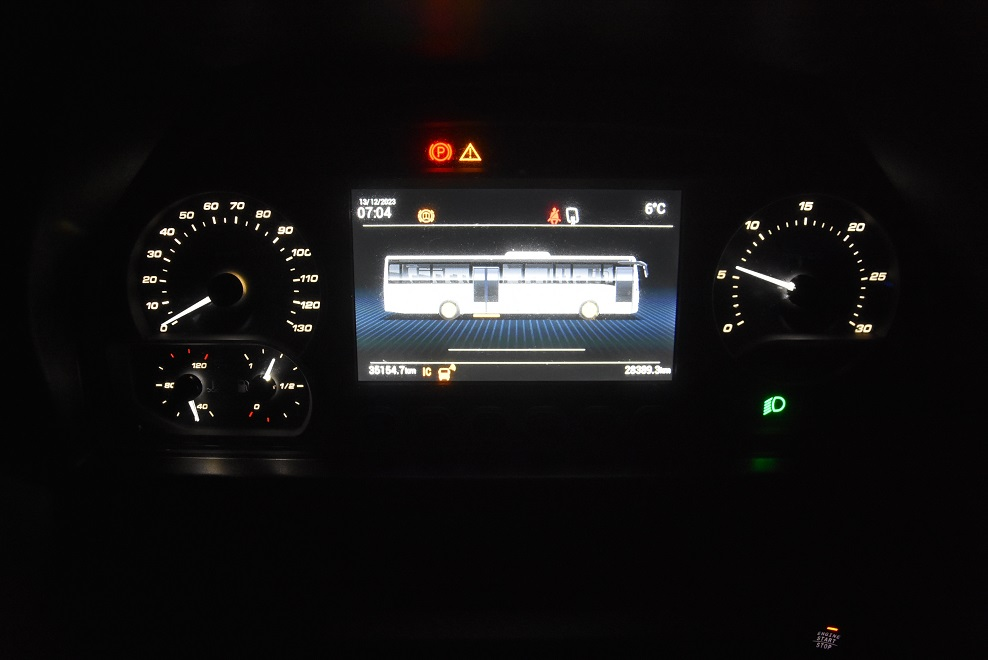
Crossway dashboard at night

The Crossway range was updated in 2013 under the Iveco Bus brand. The Euro VI models were offered with Tector 7 or Cursor 9 diesel engines and in lengths of 10.8, 12 and 13 metres.

Version	Intended use	Diesel engines
Crossway Line	Short- and medium-distance intercity services	Tector 7 or Cursor 9
Crossway HV (High Value)	Intercity services, with additional passenger-comfort equipment	Tector 7 or Cursor 9
Crossway Pro	Combined intercity services and excursions	Cursor 9
Crossway LE	Low-entry version for urban and intercity services	Tector 7 or Cursor 9
Crossway Pop	School transport	Tector 7 or Cursor 9

The Crossway LE was offered in City and Line versions for urban and intercity services. Natural-gas, hybrid and battery-electric powertrains were also added to the range.

== Powertrains ==
=== Diesel ===
Earlier Crossway models used the 5.9-litre Tector 6 and 7.8-litre Cursor 8 inline-six diesel engines, with Euro IV, Euro V or EEV specifications. The Euro VI range introduced in 2013 used the 6.7-litre Tector 7 and 8.7-litre Cursor 9 instead. Both newer engines also have an inline-six layout.

=== Natural gas and hybrid ===
The Crossway LE Natural Power was introduced in 2017, followed by the standard-floor Crossway Natural Power in 2018. Hybrid versions were introduced on the Crossway LE in 2022 and extended to the standard-floor range in 2024.

The gas engines were also compatible with biomethane. The mild-hybrid system combined a Voith DIWA NXT transmission with a 35 kW peak starter-generator and a roof-mounted 48 V lithium-titanate battery.

=== Battery electric ===
The Crossway LE Elec was unveiled in 2023, followed by the standard-floor Crossway Elec in 2024. Both were offered in 12- and 13-metre versions. The LE Elec was available in urban and intercity configurations, with a 290 kW electric motor and modular nickel manganese cobalt batteries providing up to 485 kWh.

The standard-floor Crossway Elec was intended for intercity and school transport. It used a 290 kW Siemens Elfa III motor and three to six battery packs with a total capacity of up to 416 kWh.

== Operators ==
- Albania: ALBA-TRANS, Shega-Trans, Tirana Urban Trans used Crossway Le since 2010. Nowadays, there are 46 Irisbus Crossway Le in Tirana.
- Austria: ÖBB Postbus, 'over 200' buses
- Czech Republic: Operate for Exprescar Kladno on route 399 between Kladno and Prague.
- Denmark: Midttrafik, Sydtrafik, Movia, Tide Bus, Arriva Aalborg operating 118 high-floor and 24 low-floor (Crossway LE) models
- Estonia: Operating total 88 high-floor and 43 low-floor (Crossway LE)
- Finland: Transdev Finland, (Transdev's operations in finland ended in 2019.)
- France: Aix-les-Bains (operated by Ondea) Côtes-d'Armor (operated by Ti'bus).
- Germany: OIE AG (Idar-Oberstein)
- Iceland: Operate services in Reykjavík for Straeto bs.
- Italy: TPER (Bologna), SACA Bus, CO. ER. BUS, SAB (Bergamo), SAD (South Tyrol), AIR (Avellino), Air Pullman Malpensa, Ferrovie Nord Milano Autoservizi and Azienda Trasporti Milanesi (Milan), CTT Nord, Tiemme Toscana Mobilità and Autolinee Toscane (Tuscany), GTT, Sadem (Turin), Trasporto Unico Abruzzese (Abruzzo), Cotral (Lazio), SAI (Treviglio), ATP Esercizio (Liguria), ARST (Sardinia), Azienda per la Mobilità Integrata (Pesaro), STAV (Vigevano), TPL Linea (Savona), TPL FVG (Udine), CLP (Caserta)
- Netherlands: Amstelveen. Connexxion, operating 68 Iveco Crossway Low Entry
- Portugal: TST - Transportes Sul do Tejo SA, operates 194 Crossway City LE, 17 Crossway City LE CNG and 25 Crossway Line models.
- Spain: Intercitybus (Lanzarote)
- Slovakia: SAD Trenčín a.s. (Trenčín region)
- Sweden: Jönköpings Länstrafik operates 2 Crossways owned by Aneby Buss AB
- United States Army: used as shuttles on army bases across Europe.
- Kosovo: Capital City, Pristina, operates with these buses as part of their urban transport.

== See also ==
- List of buses
