= Karosa C 935 =

Czech intercity bus

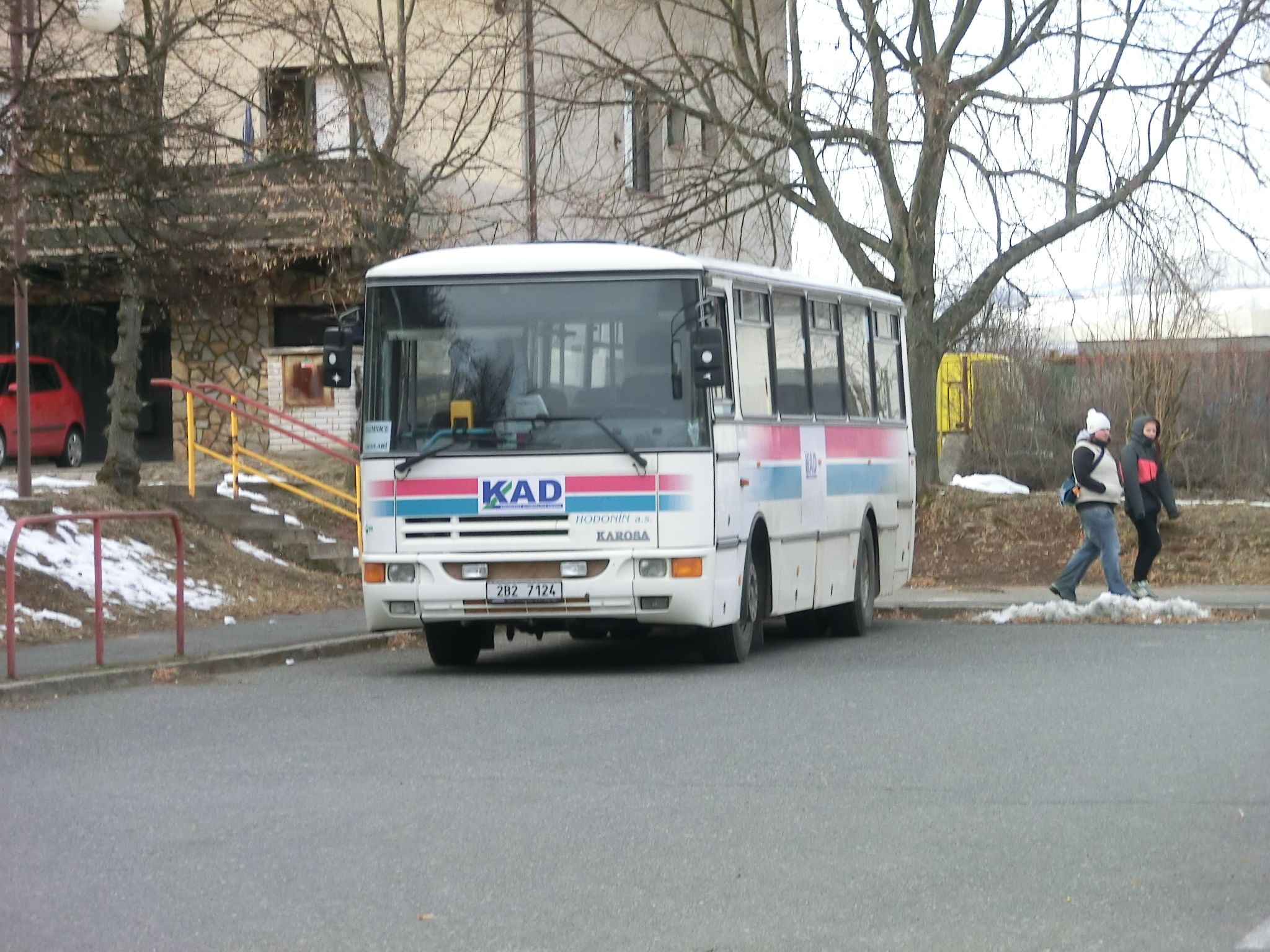
- Karosa C 935 in Jilemnice, Czech Republic

Overview
- Manufacturer: Karosa

Body and chassis
- Doors: 2, air-operated
- Floor type: High-floor
- Chassis: semi-self-supporting with frame

Powertrain
- Engine: Renault MIHR 062045 V6 Diesel engine
- Capacity: 45 sitting 16 standing
- Power output: 186 kW (249 hp) - 188 kW (252 hp)

Dimensions
- Length: 11,345 mm (446.7 in)
- Width: 2,500 mm (98.4 in)
- Height: 3,165 mm (124.6 in)
- Curb weight: 10,450 kg (23,040 lb)

Chronology
- Predecessor: Karosa C 735
- Successor: Karosa C 956

Karosa C 935 is an intercity bus produced from 1997 to 2001 by bus manufacturer Karosa from the Czech Republic. In 1999, an upgraded version, C935E, was launched. It was succeeded by Karosa C 956 in 2002.

== Construction features ==
Karosa C 935 is basic model of Karosa 900 series. C 935 is derived from Karosa C 934 inter city bus, and also unified with city bus models such as B 941 and B 932. Body is semi-self-supporting with frame and engine with manual gearbox is placed in the rear part. Only rear axle is propulsed. Front axle is independent, rear axle is solid. All axles are mounted on air suspension. On the right side are two doors. Inside are used leatherette seats. Drivers cab is not separated from the rest of the vehicle.

== Production and operation ==
In the year 1997 started serial production, which continued until 2001. Since 1999 were buses produced only in modernised version B 935 E, which has new solid front axle Škoda-LIAZ, ABS and ASR.

Currently, number of Karosa C935 buses is decreasing, due to high age of buses.

== Historical vehicles ==
Any historical vehicle was not saved yet.

== See also ==
- (in Czech) Article about Karosa C 934 and C 935 operated in Prague
- List of buses
