= Sakarya =

Sakarya may refer to:

== Places ==
- Sakarya (continent), a small continent 90 million years ago
- Sakarya, Ardanuç, a village in Artvin Province, Turkey
- Sakarya, Polatlı, a village in Ankara Province, Turkey
- Sakarya gas field, in the Black Sea
- Sakarya Province, in Turkey
  - Sakarya (electoral district)
  - Sakarya University
- Sakarya River, in Turkey
- Chirai River, also known as Sakara River, in Gujarat, India

== Other uses ==
- T-122 Sakarya, a Turkish multiple launch rocket system
- TCG Sakarya (S 332), a Turkish submarine
- Rüştü Sakarya (1877–1951), officer of the Ottoman Army and general of the Turkish Army

== See also ==
- Sakaya (disambiguation)
