= Sakaya =

Sakaya may refer to:

- Sakaya (dialect), a dialect of the Barein language
- Sakaya, California, former Native American settlement

== People ==
- Akira Sakaya (昌谷 彰; 1870–1946), Japanese Director of the Karafuto Agency

== See also ==
- Sakay (disambiguation)
- Sakarya (disambiguation)
