= Karosa C 954 =

Czech intercity bus

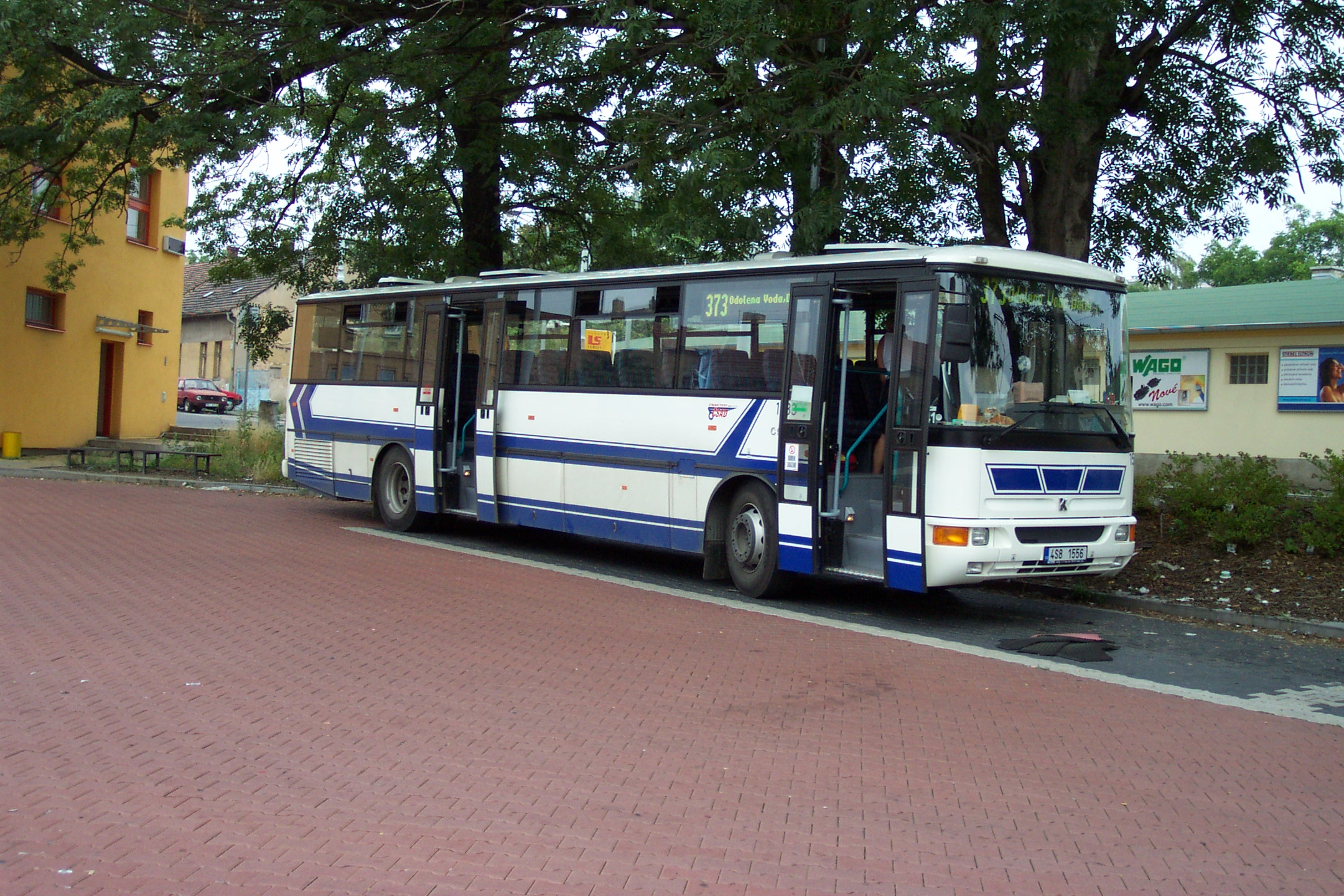
- Karosa C 954E in Prague, Czech Republic

Overview
- Manufacturer: Karosa

Body and chassis
- Doors: 2, air-operated
- Floor type: High-floor
- Chassis: semi-self-supporting with frame

Powertrain
- Engine: Iveco Cursor 8 F2B Euro III
- Power output: 225 kW (302 hp)
- Transmission: Praga 5-speed manual ZF 6-speed manual

Dimensions
- Length: 11990 mm
- Width: 2500 mm
- Height: 3165 mm
- Curb weight: 10800 kg

Chronology
- Predecessor: Karosa C 934
- Successor: Irisbus Crossway

Karosa C 954 is an intercity bus produced from 2002 to 2006 by bus manufacturer Karosa from the Czech Republic. In 2003, a modernised version C954E was introduced. It was succeeded by Irisbus Crossway in 2006.

== Construction features ==
Karosa C 954 is the basic model of Karosa 900 series. C 954 is unified with city bus models such as B 952 and B 961. The body was assembled to the skeleton which has undergone a dip stage, sheets were galvanized and painted, and then additional components were installed. The body is a semi-self-supporting frame, with the engine and manual gearbox placed in the rear part. Only the rear axle is propulsed. Front and rear axles are solid. All axles are mounted on air suspension. On the right side are two doors. Inside are used cloth seats. The driver's cab is not separated from the rest of the vehicle.

== Production and operation ==
Serial production started in 2002 which continued until 2006. Since 200, buses were produced only in the modernised C 954 E version, which had glass glued to the skeleton instead of glass mounted in rubber, and better ventilation of the engine compartment.

== See also ==
- Article about Karosa C 954 buses in Prague
- Photogallery of Karosa C 954
- Technical specs on manufacturers webpage (on web archive)
- List of buses
