= Karosa 900 series =

Series of Czech buses

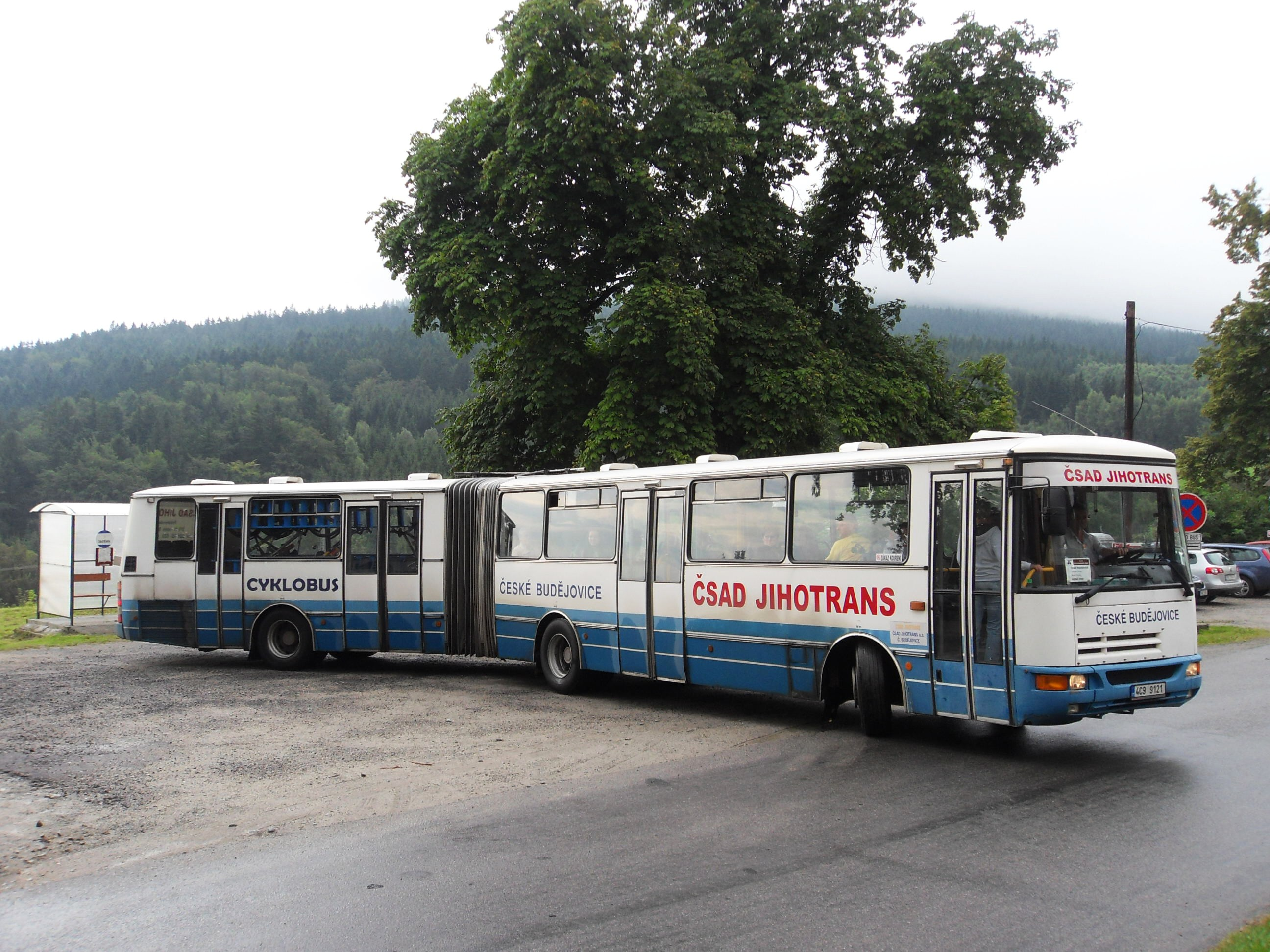
Karosa B 941

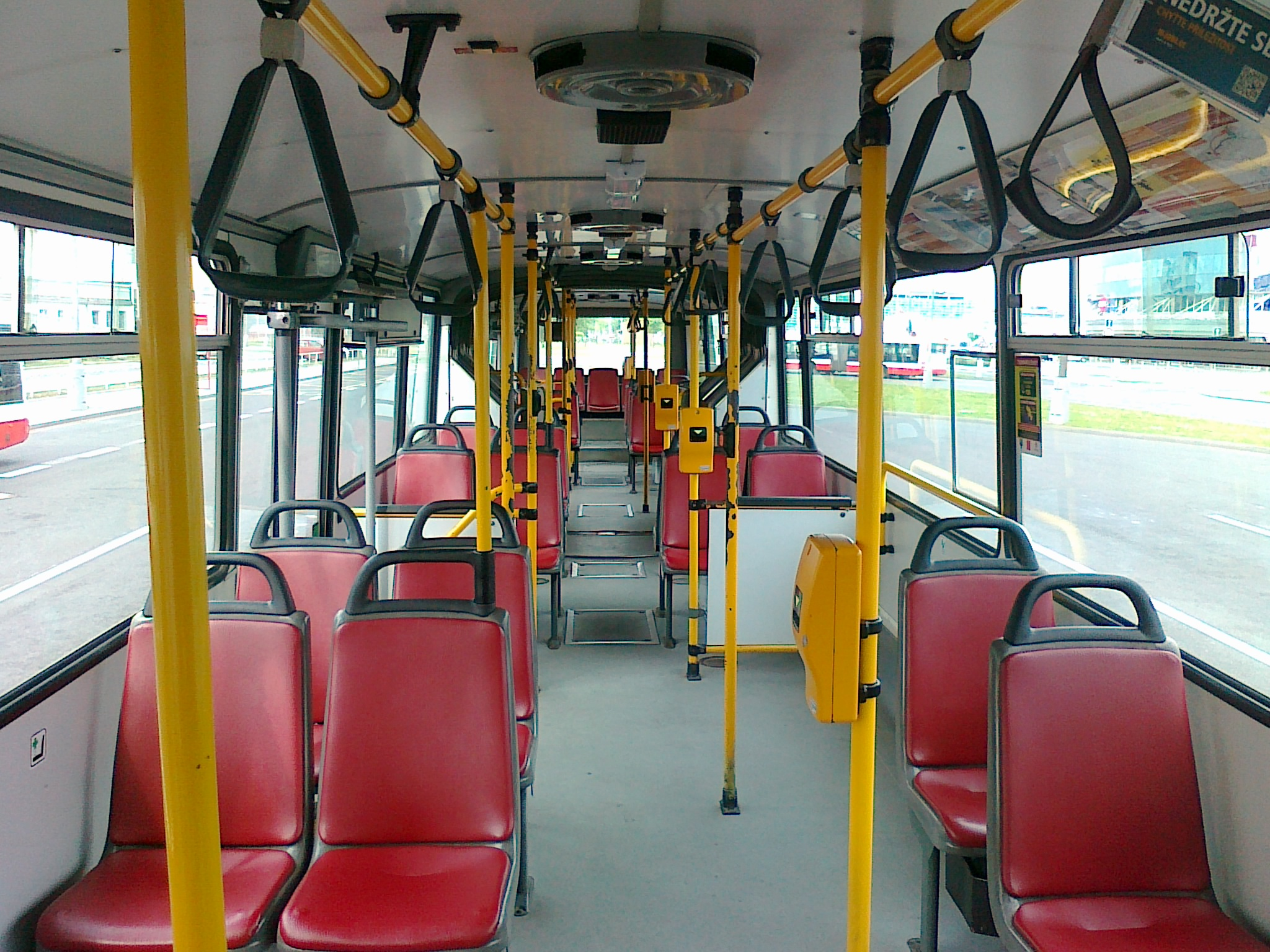
Interior of Karosa B 941 with Fainsa seats

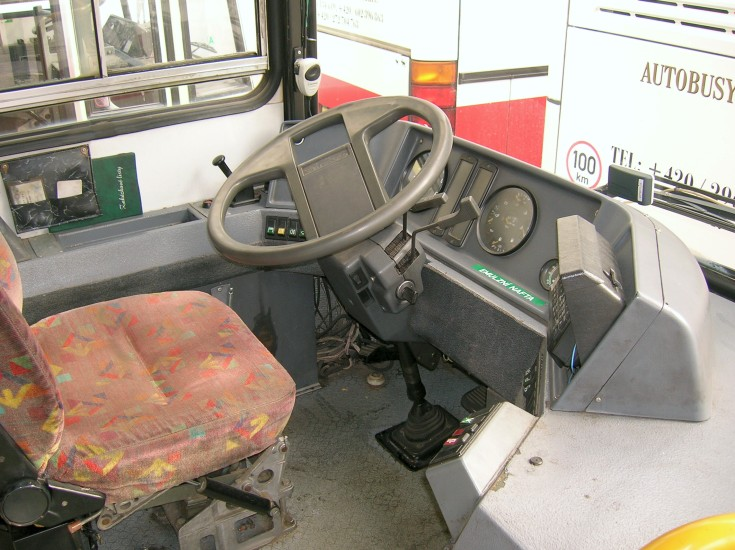
Drivers cab

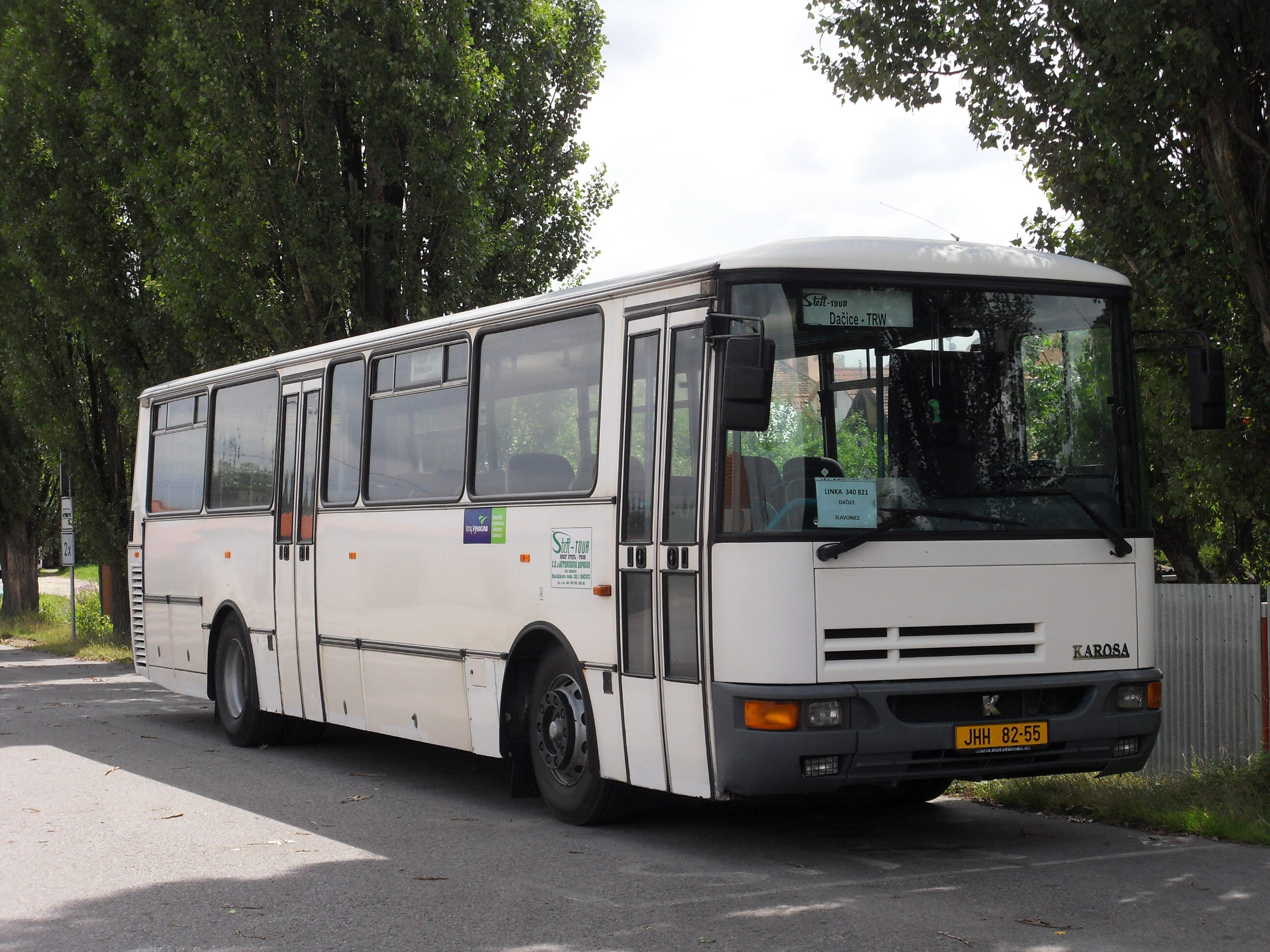
Karosa C 934 E

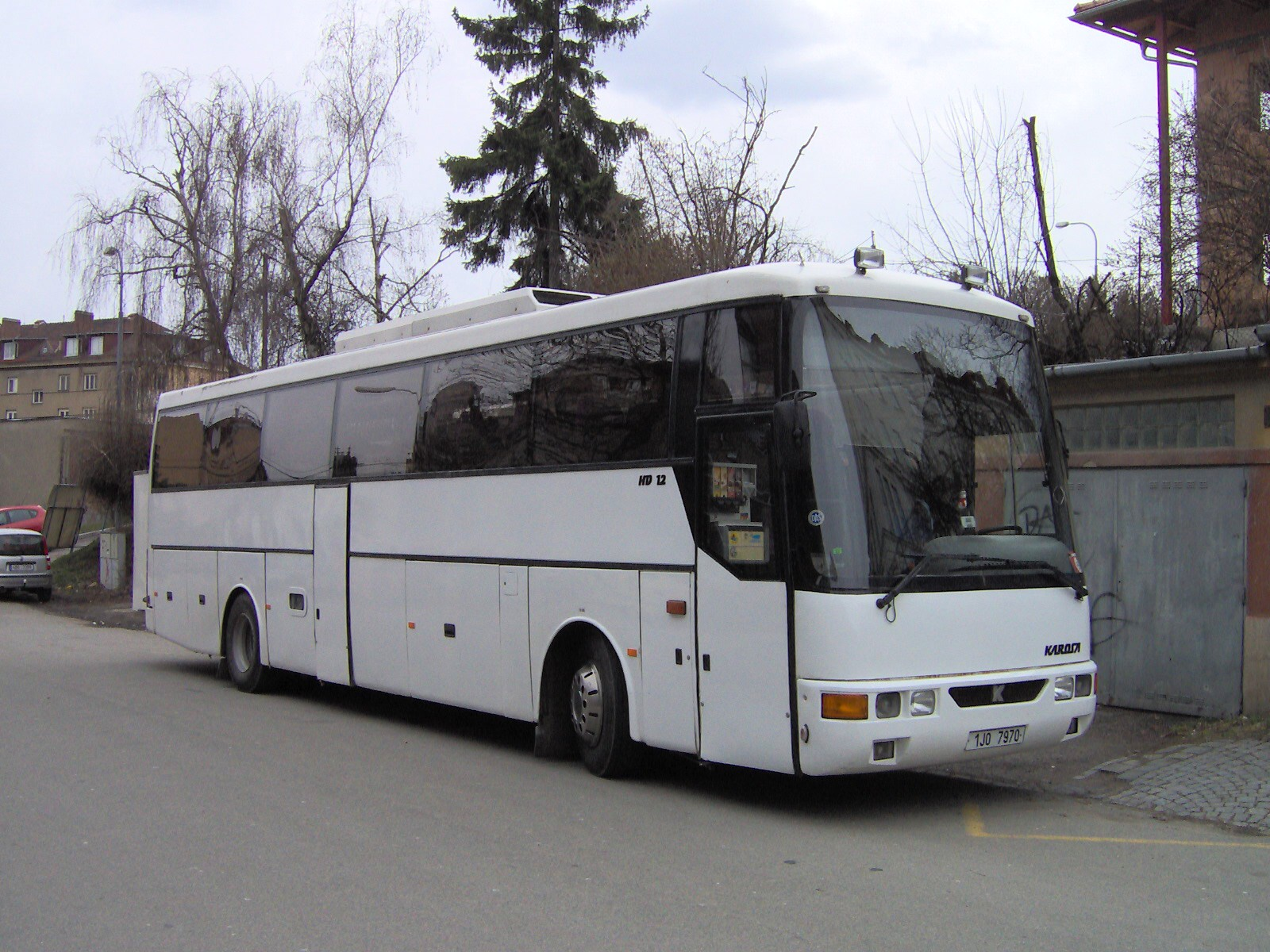
Karosa LC 957

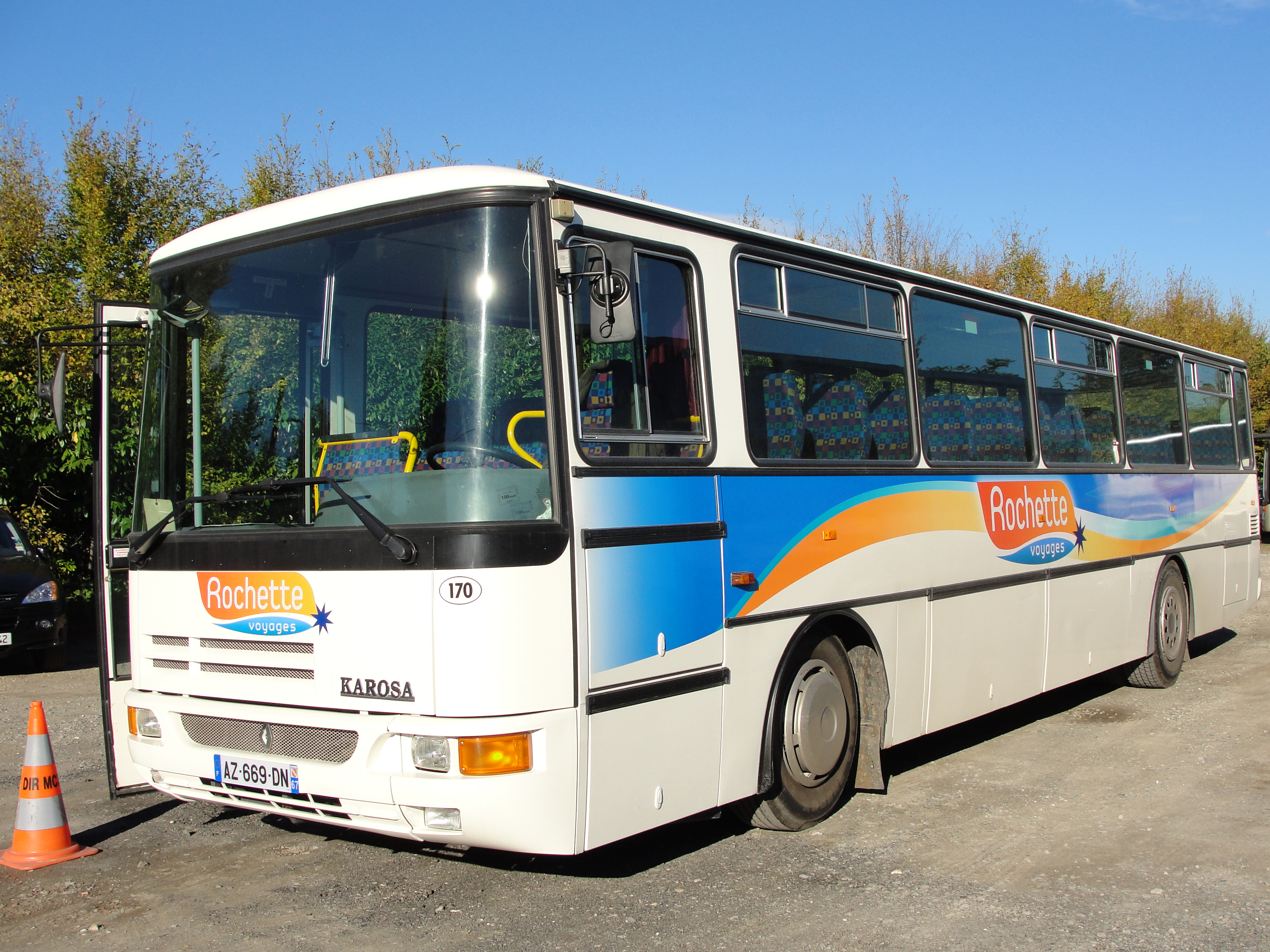
Karosa Récréo

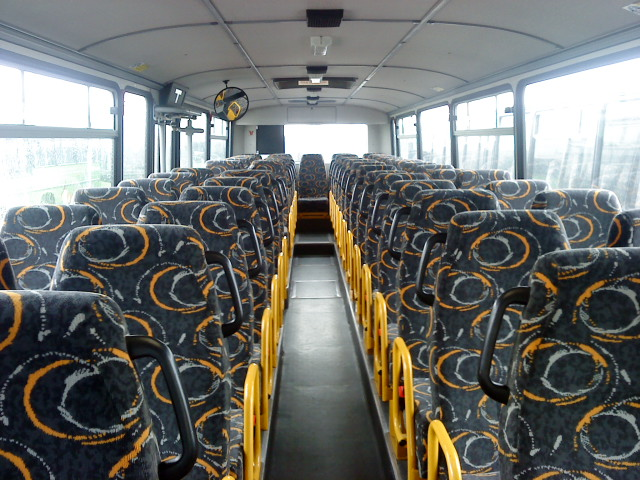
Interior of Karosa Récréo

Karosa 900 series is a collective term for several modifications of a bus which was produced by Czech company Karosa in the town Vysoké Mýto from 1994 to 2007. The basic models of this series are intercity bus Karosa C 934 and the later produced C 954.

== History ==
After completion of the project 800 Series in the early 1990s and several radically modified prototype vehicles of the 700 series Karosa decided to "only" modernize range of 700 to 900. Production of a series of test series of new buses began in 1995, the serial production started in 1996 (B 931 city buses). A year later started production and other models (including the basic type C 934) Series 930 (standard bus) and 940 (articulated bus). Since 1996, was manufactured for the French market school bus Récréo, which became an unprecedentedly successful product. Compared to the 700 series changes were made in the driver's cab, which was equipped with a completely new layout dash with associated LED panel and "alarms". The steering wheel was adjustable and buses had electrically adjustable exterior mirrors. Visually, the design was improved according to current trends - front and back face was rounded and windscreen was large, undisturbed by columns. Otherwise, the 900 series buses were designed from the ground up based on the previous model. A certain exception was the wiring, which was completely redesigned in terms of Western customs. Partial Innovation 900 series took place in 1999. For example, at the municipal performance was in front of a lowered floor of 100 mm. Also, system control functions, and the door has been changed. Emphasis was placed on meeting European standards in the field of ecology and safety. Thus, an innovated line was rated as 900 E (E = evolution).

Radical modernization of the 900 series touched in years 2001 and 2002, when Karosa began producing buses series 950 (standard bus) and 960 (articulated bus) and also ended production of the series 930 and 940. Modernization itself didn't change only on the outer the appearance of the bus. Modernisation was needed because of the entry into force of EURO 3 emission standards, which led to the introduction of engines Iveco that comply with this standard. Also a leading independent swing axle was removed, and was replaced by rigid axle Škoda or RI75. In interurban cars C 954/955 and coach LC 956 has been cooling moved from the front radiator to the right side of the rear overhang, i.e. next to the engine. In autumn 2003 were again slightly modified production buses (the type designation was added the letter E). Modification consisted among others in better ventilation of the engine compartment (adding the ventilation grilles in the rear panel) and the glued glazing. Production of the 900 series buses, which was ended during the year 2006 was completed at the end of January 2007. Successor in production have become the new buses from Irisbus.

A special category is a remote and not very widespread buses (Coach) Karosa LC 937 and LC 957. The first - LC 937 (GT 11), which other cars too unlike the 900 series, was produced from 1994 to 1996. Coach LC 957 (HD 12) with a raised floor was a successor to the LC 757 and its production lasted from 1997 to 1999.

A total of 13,071 units of buses series 900 were made.

== Designation ==
For new buses reserved Karosa 900 series, thus 9xx. Before number was still one or two letters.

- Letter: car type - B (urban and suburban bus English 'b' us), C (and intercity bus line in English 'c' oach), LC (remote and coach, English 'l' ong distance 'c' oach)
- First figure: marked '9' 0th years
- Second figure: the length of the car - 3 = 11 m, 4 = 17 m, 5 = 12 m, 6 = 18 m
- Third digit: additional specifications
  - B and C buses: 1 = city with an automatic transmission, 2 = suburban and manual transmission, 3 = regional with an automatic transmission, 4 = intercity manual transmission, 5 and 6 = intercity with manual transmission and a larger luggage compartment (for longer lines or tours)
  - buses LC: 6 or 7 digits indicate the level of comfort (the higher the number, the more luxurious bus)

== Variants ==
- Karosa B 931 and B 951 - a standard three-door city bus
- Karosa B 932 and B 952 - a standard three-door city and suburban buses
- Karosa C 934 and C 954 - a two-door intercity bus
- Karosa C 935 and C 955 (also Récréo) - a two-door intercity bus for longer lines
- Karosa C 956 (Axer) - two-door intercity bus for longer lines
- Karosa LC 936 and LC 956 - a two-door coach
- Karosa LC 937 and LC 957 - a two-door coach
- Karosa B 941 and B 961 - a four-door articulated city bus
- Karosa C 943 - a three-door articulated intercity bus

== Construction ==
Structurally series 930 and 940 were derived from previous 700 series and have semi-self supporting body, which is composed of panels, which were produced on separate lines were surface treated and then were assembled together. Engine and transmission are stored behind the rear axle, which is driven.

Newer buses with the 950 and 960 series were produced differently. First was assembled skeleton, which passed dip stage painting and sheeting. These buses have different design of rear part.

== See also ==
- List of buses
