= Sakarya (continent) =

Sakarya was a small continent that existed approximately 90 million years ago in the Tethys Ocean of Europe during the Cretaceous period. In later continental drift and orogeny it became part of northern Turkey.
