= Jedlička Institute =

Medical and educational institute in Prague

- Jedličkův ústav
- Founded: 1 April 1913
- Founder: Rudolf Jedlička
- Type: Non-profit organisation
- Purpose: Disabled young people
- Location: Prague, Czech Republic
- Coordinates: 50°3′44.67″N 14°25′20.98″E
- Website: Official website

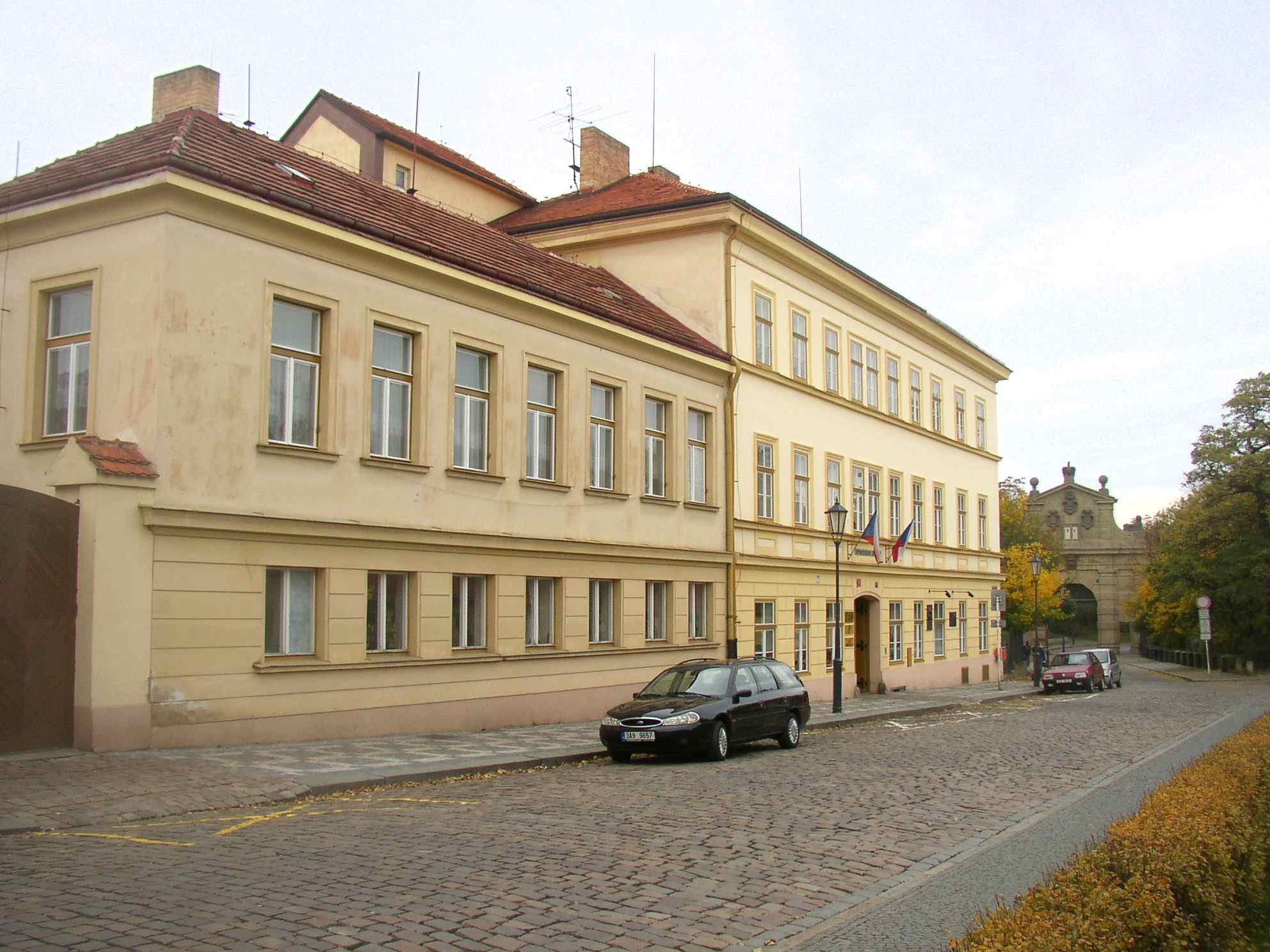
Jedlička's Institute for Disabled Children in Prague, Vyšehrad

Jedlička Institute (Czech: Jedličkův ústav) is a Czech medical and educational institute specialized in the care of disabled children and adults. The primary location of the institute is situated in the Prague district of Vyšehrad. It was founded in 1913 by surgeon Rudolf Jedlička and is the oldest facility of its kind in the Czech Republic. The institute includes a nursery, primary school and several types of secondary schools.

== History ==
Jedlička's Institute was founded on 1 April 1913 by the Spolek pro léčbu a výchovu rachitiků a mrzáků v Praze ("Association for Treatment and Education of Rachitics and Cripples") in Prague. Rudolf Jedlička, the chairman of the association, intended to improve the education of disabled people and integrate them into normal life, according to his own words, "to turn beggars into taxpayers".

The first director of the institute was the teacher and choirmaster František Bakule. At the beginning of World War I, the institute became part of a program focused on the treatment, rehabilitation, and integration of soldiers injured in the war.

In the 1920s, under the director Augustin Bartoš, the capacity of the institute was increased by building a new school. After 1945 and the subsequent communist takeover in 1948, the institute was transferred to the state. At the same time, it was merged with a similar institute in Liberec.

The founder of the institution, Rudolf Jedlička, donated his villa in Harrachov (a resort in the Giant Mountains) to the school. In the 1950s, the villa was handed over to the state and was rebuilt into a government holiday resort.
