= Karosa LC 956 =

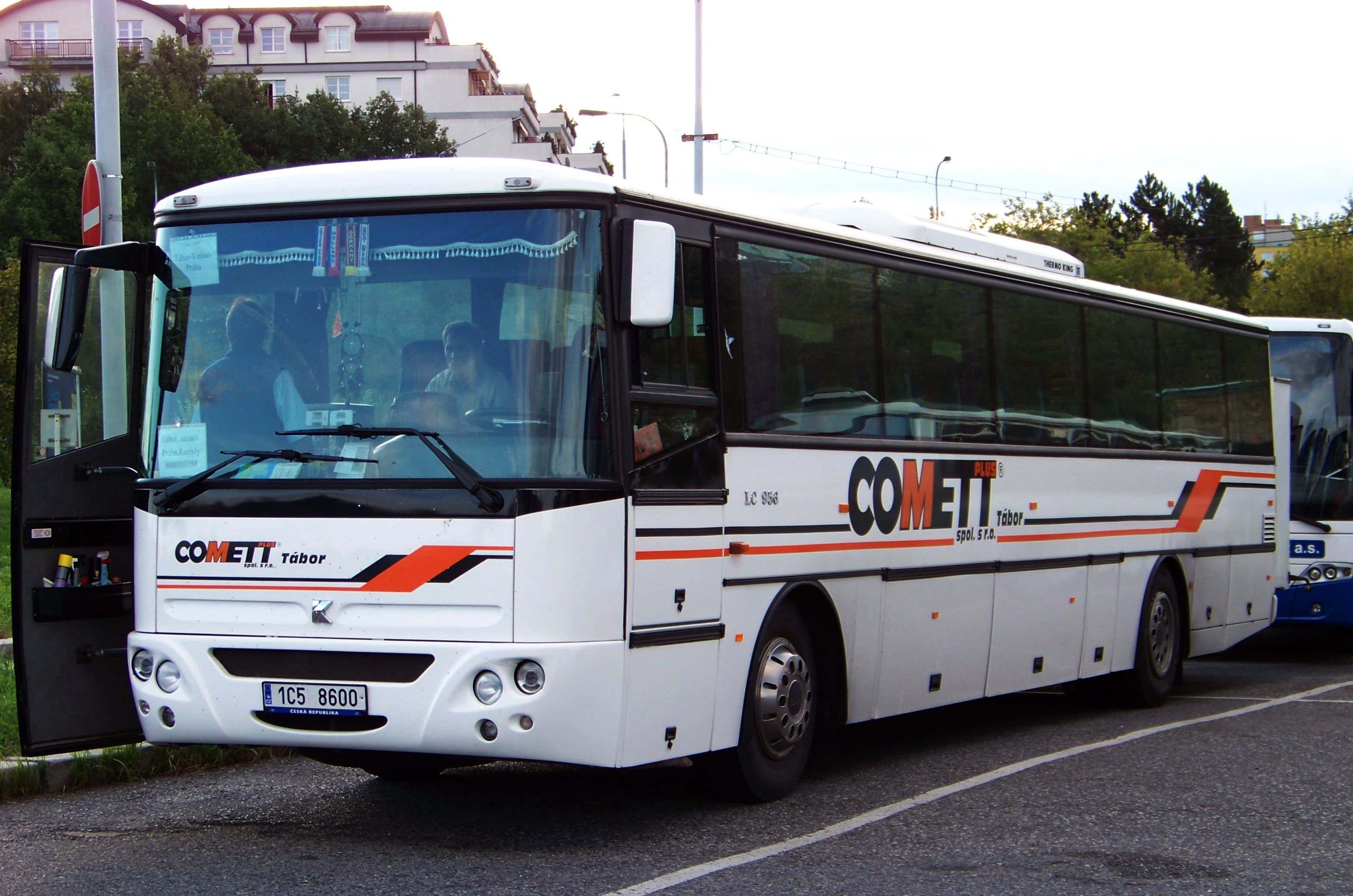
- Karosa LC 956 in Prague, Czech Republic

Overview
- Manufacturer: Karosa

Body and chassis
- Doors: 2, air-operated
- Floor type: High-floor
- Chassis: semi-self-supporting with frame

Powertrain
- Engine: Iveco Cursor F2 B Euro III
- Power output: 228 kW
- Transmission: ZF 6-speed manual

Dimensions
- Length: 11320 mm
- Width: 2500 mm
- Height: 3165 mm
- Curb weight: 12000 kg

Chronology
- Predecessor: Karosa LC 936

Karosa LC 956 is a long-distance coach produced from 2002 to 2006 by bus manufacturer Karosa from the Czech Republic. In 2003, a modernised version LC 956 E was introduced.

== Construction features ==
Karosa LC 956 is a model of Karosa 900 series. LC 956 is unified with city bus models such as B 952 and B 961. Body was assembled to the skeleton, which has undergone a dip stage, sheets were galvanized and painted and then to have it installed additional components. Body is semi-self-supporting with frame and engine with manual gearbox is placed in the rear part. Only rear axle is propulsed. Front and rear axles are solid. All axles are mounted on air suspension. On the right side are two doors. Inside are used cloth seats. Driver's cab is not separated from the rest of the vehicle.

== Production and operation ==
Serial production started in 2002 and continued until 2006. After 2003, only a modernised version, LC 956 E, was produced.

== Historical vehicles ==
Any historical vehicle was not saved yet.

== See also ==
- List of buses
