= Sakay.ph =

Philippine web and mobile mapping service

- Screenshot of Sakay.ph in a web browser
- Website type: Web mapping Trip planner
- Available in: English
- Country of origin: Philippines
- Owner: Sakay Mobility Philippines Corporation
- Creator: By Implication (now Bonito Tech)
- Website: sakay.ph
- Advertising: Yes
- Commercial: Yes
- Registration: Optional
- Launched: 2013; 13 years ago
- Current status: Active
- Content license: Proprietary

Sakay.ph, also known as Sakay, is a Philippine web mapping service and mobile app that provides public transport route planning and navigation within Metro Manila and its surrounding areas. The platform uses a combination of official government transport data and crowdsourced route information to provide directions for various modes of public transport in the Philippines, including jeepneys, buses, rail systems, and ferries.

== History ==
Sakay.ph was developed as a side project by Philip Cheang and Thomas Dy of the software company By Implication. It originated as an entry to the Philippine Transit App Challenge, a three-month hackathon held in 2013 organized by the Department of Transportation and Communications, Metropolitan Manila Development Authority, and the Cebu City government. The hackathon was designed to stimulate the development of navigation tools using the Philippine Transit Information Service, an AusAID-funded and World Bank-supported initiative that developed the first comprehensive General Transit Feed Specification (GTFS) dataset for Metro Manila, covering more than 900 public transport routes.

The project was among ten finalists selected from 17 entries and received the Open Community Award. Following the competition, Sakay.ph experienced increased usage, with developer-reported figures approximating 25,000 visits being made to its website in July 2013 and around 320,000 total requests between October 2013 and June 2014.

In February 2015, Sakay.ph was relaunched with support for mobile devices.

In 2016, Sakay.ph launched Traincheck, a feature that estimated passenger congestion along the MRT Line 3 using predictive models trained on live public CCTV feeds provided by the Department of Transportation (DOTr). The feature showed crowd level estimates to help commuters avoid peak congestion periods by identifying less crowded travel times. It was later discontinued when public access to the MRT-3 CCTV feed was shut down.

In 2018, Sakay.ph reported that it had reached one million users since its launch.

During the COVID-19 pandemic, Sakay.ph partnered with the Pasig city government and the Department of Transportation to provide route information and live tracking for free shuttles for health workers and frontliners. The platform also partnered with the operator of the LRT Line 1, the Light Rail Manila Corporation, to integrate multimodal transit directions into "ikotMNL", a companion app for LRT-1 that provides train and tourist information.

In 2022, Sakay.ph received a Gold Award in the Systems & Service Design category of the Philippine Good Design Award.

In 2023, Sakay.ph partnered with the Quezon City government to provide navigation and real-time tracking for buses under the Quezon City Bus Service (QCity Bus).

== Availability ==
Sakay.ph is available through its website and as a mobile app on both iOS and Android devices. The iOS version is compatible with devices running iOS 12.1 or later (including iPadOS 12.1 or later), while the Android version is compatible with devices running Android 7.0 and above. As of May 2026, the Android version of Sakay.ph has been downloaded over 500,000 times.
