= Karosa LC 737 =

Prototype long-distance coach

Overview
- Manufacturer: Karosa

Body and chassis
- Doors: 2, air-operated
- Floor type: High-floor
- Chassis: semi-self-supporting with frame

Powertrain
- Capacity: 42 sitting

Chronology
- Successor: Karosa LC 937

Karosa LC 737 is a prototype of a long-distance coach produced by bus manufacturer Karosa from the Czech Republic, made in the year 1991. It was succeeded by Karosa LC 937 in 1996.

== Construction features ==
Karosa LC 737 is a model of Karosa 700 series. LC 737 is unified with intercity bus models such as C 734 and B 732, but has completely different design. Its body is semi-self-supporting with frame and engine with manual gearbox is placed in the rear. Only the rear axle is propulsed. The front axle is independent, while the rear axle is solid. All axles are mounted on air suspension. On the right side are two doors. The bus has high padded seats. Driver's cab is not separated from the rest of the vehicle.

== Production and operation ==
In the year 1991 was made one prototype.

== Historical vehicles ==
empty

== See also ==
- List of buses
