= Karosa C 934 =

Type of Czech intercity bus

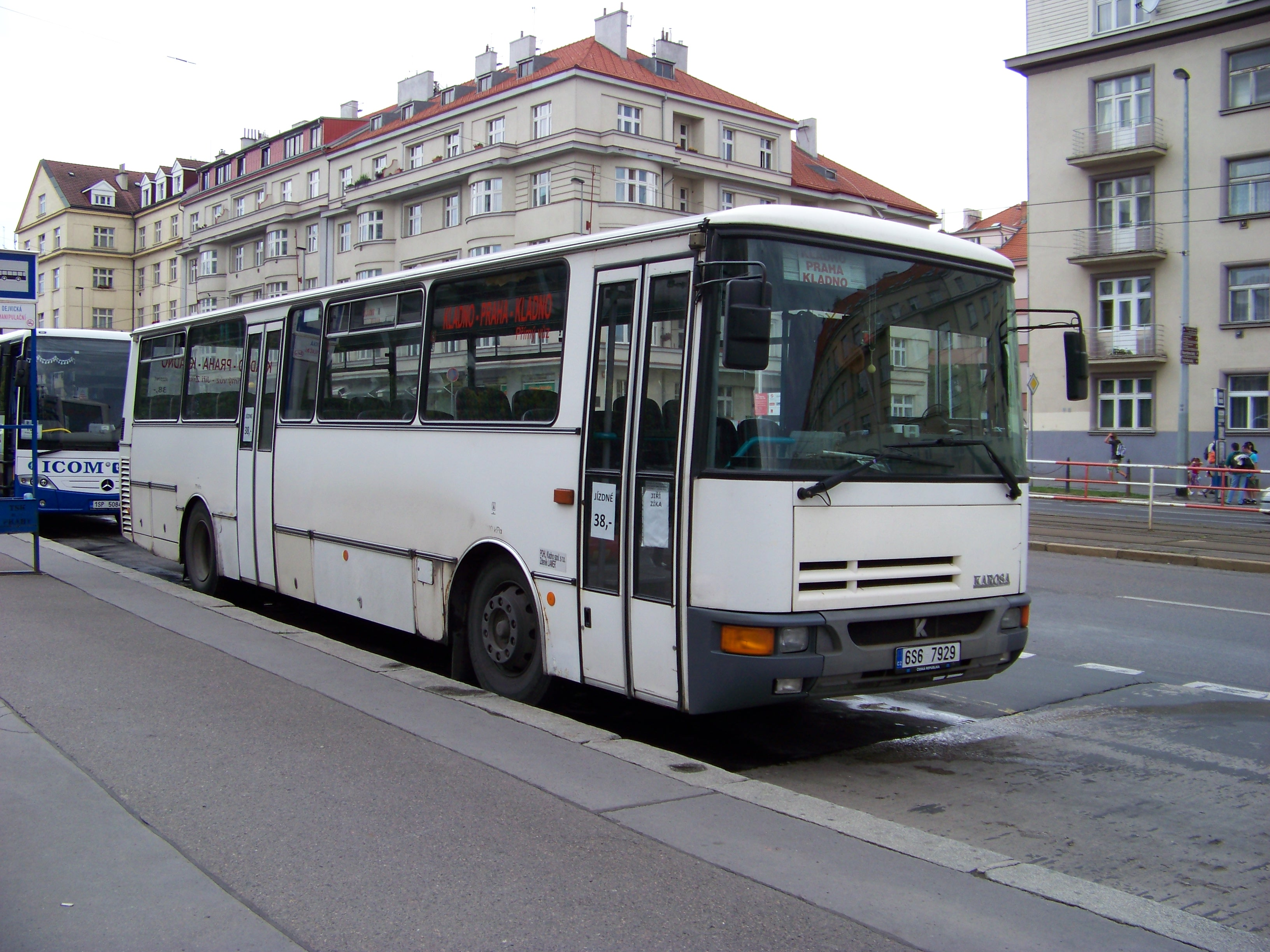
- Karosa C 934 in Prague, Czech Republic

Overview
- Manufacturer: Karosa

Body and chassis
- Doors: 2, air-operated
- Floor type: High-floor
- Chassis: semi-self-supporting with frame

Powertrain
- Engine: Renault MIHR 062045 V6 Diesel engine
- Power output: 186 kW (249 hp) - 188 kW (252 hp)

Dimensions
- Length: 11,345 mm (446.7 in)
- Width: 2,500 mm (98.4 in)
- Height: 3,165 mm (124.6 in)
- Curb weight: 10,450 kg (23,040 lb)

Chronology
- Predecessor: Karosa C 734
- Successor: Karosa C 954

Karosa C 934 is an intercity bus produced from 1996 to 2002 by bus manufacturer Karosa from the Czech Republic. In 1999 an upgraded version, C 934E, was introduced. It was succeeded by Karosa C 954 in 2002.

== Construction features ==
Karosa C 934 is basic model of Karosa 900 series. C 934 is derived from its predecessor, Karosa C 734 inter-city bus, and is also unified with city bus models such as B 941 and B 932. The body is semi-self-supporting with a frame and engine with the manual gearbox placed in the rear part. Only the rear axle is propulsed. The front axle is independent, the rear axle is solid. All axles are mounted on air suspension. On the right side are two doors. Inside are used leatherette seats. The driver's cab is not separated from the rest of the vehicle.

== Production and operation ==
In the year 1996 started serial production, which continued until 2002. Since 1999 buses have been produced only in modernised version C 934 E, which has a new solid front axle Škoda-LIAZ, ABS and ASR.

Currently, the number of Karosa C934 buses is decreasing, due to the high age of buses.

== Historical vehicles ==
Any historical vehicle was not saved yet.

== See also ==
- (in Czech) Article about Karosa C 934 and C 935 operated in Prague
- List of buses
