= Emma Maria Herzig =

Member of the Senate
- In office 1920–1925
- Constituency: Hradec Králové

Personal details
- Born: 25 March 1873 Reinowitz, Austria-Hungary
- Died: 1 March 1933 (aged 59) Liberec, Czechoslovakia

Emma Maria Herzig (25 March 1873 – 1 March 1933) was a Czechoslovak medical doctor and politician. In 1920 she was one of the first group of women elected to the Senate.

== Biography ==
Herzig was born in Reinowitz in Bohemia, Austria-Hungary (now part of Jablonec nad Nisou, Czech Republic) on 25 March 1873, the daughter of a factory owner and the granddaughter of Wilhelm Herzig, a member of the 1848 Frankfurt Parliament. She received a private education in Graz and studied medicine at the University of Vienna and the University of Graz, receiving a doctorate of medicine in 1905. She continued her postgraduate studies in Graz, Baden bei Wien, Prague and Germany. In 1908 she started working as a general practitioner in Reichenberg, specialising in women's and nervous conditions.

Following the independence of Czechoslovakia at the end of World War I, Herzig joined the German National Party. She was one of its candidate for the Senate in the 1920 parliamentary elections, in which she was one of sixteen women elected to parliament. After leaving parliament in 1925, she served as president of the Association of German Women's Associations until 1933. She also served on Liberec City Council. She died in Liberec in March 1933.
