= LIAZ 400 series =

Czech freight truck series

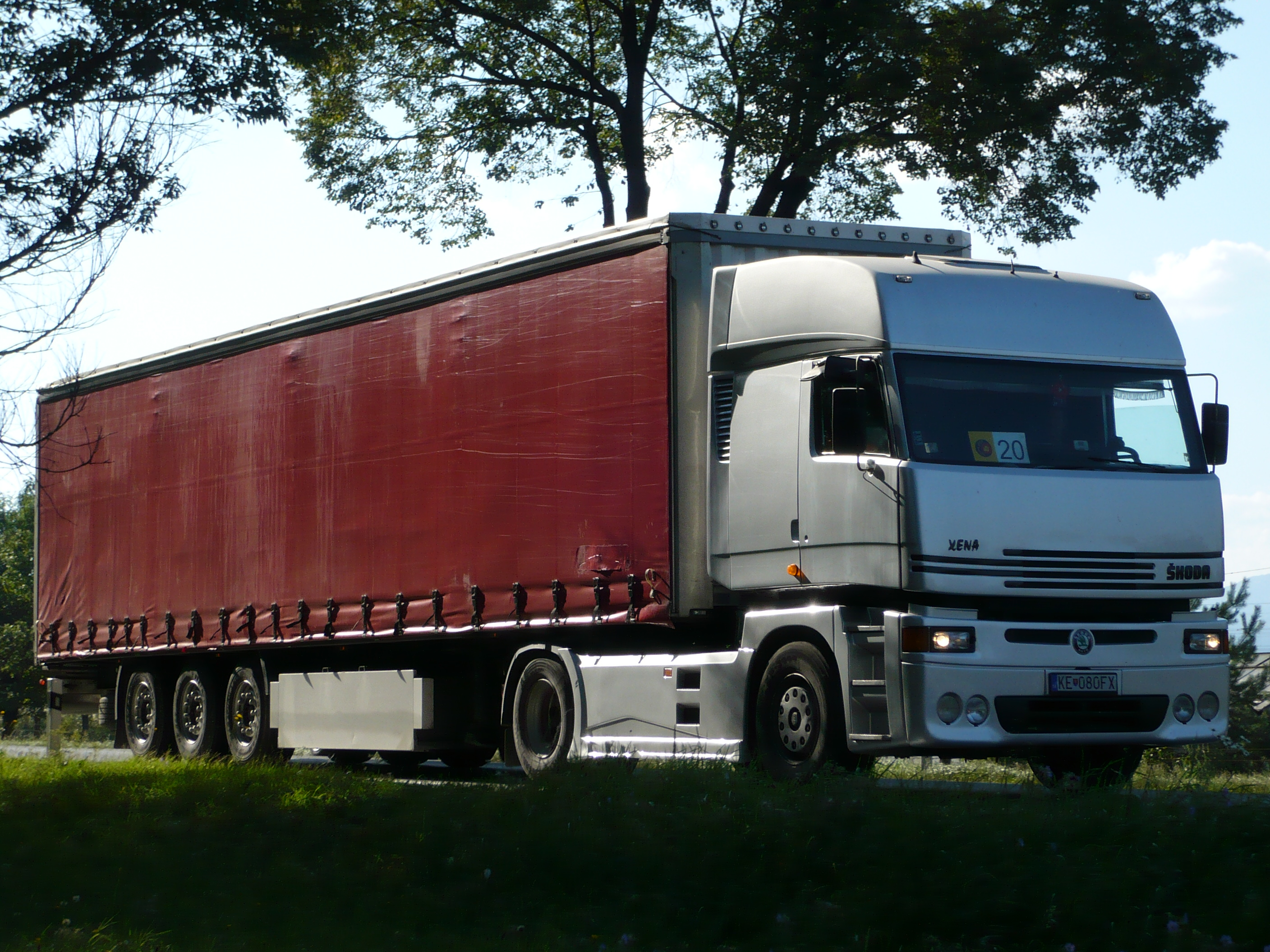
Škoda Xena

The LIAZ 400 series were trucks manufactured by Czech company LIAZ from 1996–2003. There were two types; the Xena tractor and the Fox truck. The Xena tractor was also sold under the Škoda marque.

== Xena ==
The Xena tractor was introduced in 1996 in an auto show in Hannover. Development began in the 90th years later they come into production as well as other types and gradually replaced the obsolete 300 series. The Škoda Xena was only produced in the 4x2 tractor unit high cab. There are but modifications to the flatbed 6x2 and 6x2 tipper.

== Fox ==
Dump truck Škoda Fox came three years later. Large quantities of components are adapted from the previous series, but the chassis, engine and cab are new. Aluminium cabin Škoda Liaz SKL (modular construction LIAZ) is built simple "modular" system to be easy to produce it longer or shorter. Ladder frame, rear tapered dimensions of 850 × 200 × 80. It was made a number of trucks with different superstructures.

Several years after the end of production, the production was resumed by Czech company TEDOM, which produced trucks Fox TEDOM D and TEDOM G. Fox. However, the company produced only about 20 vehicles until 2010.

All trucks Škoda Fox and Fox Tedom are equipped with short cab, chassis configurations were: - 4x2 - 4x4 - 6x4 (only TEDOM)
