= Rýnovice =

Rýnovice Reinowitz
- Village
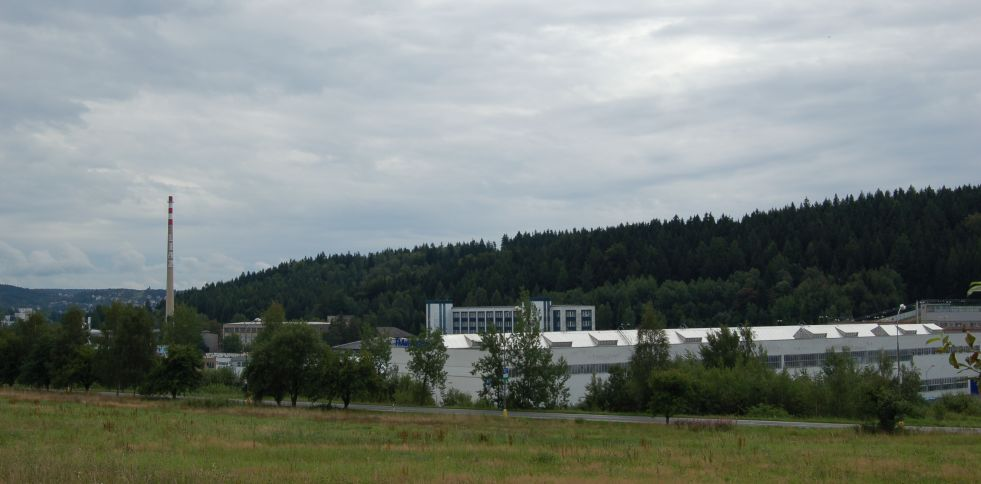

- Location in the Czech Republic
- Coordinates: 50.724444°N 15.168056°E
- Country: Czech Republic
- Region: Liberec
- District: Jablonec nad Nisou District
- First mentioned: 1559

Population
  - Total: 2,200
- Time zone: UTC+1 (CET)
  - Summer (DST): UTC+2 (CEST)
- Postal code: 466 05

Rýnovice (German: Reinowitz) is part of the town of Jablonec nad Nisou in the district of Jablonec nad Nisou, in the Liberec region, in the Czech Republic. Today nearly 2200 people live in Rýnovice.

== History ==
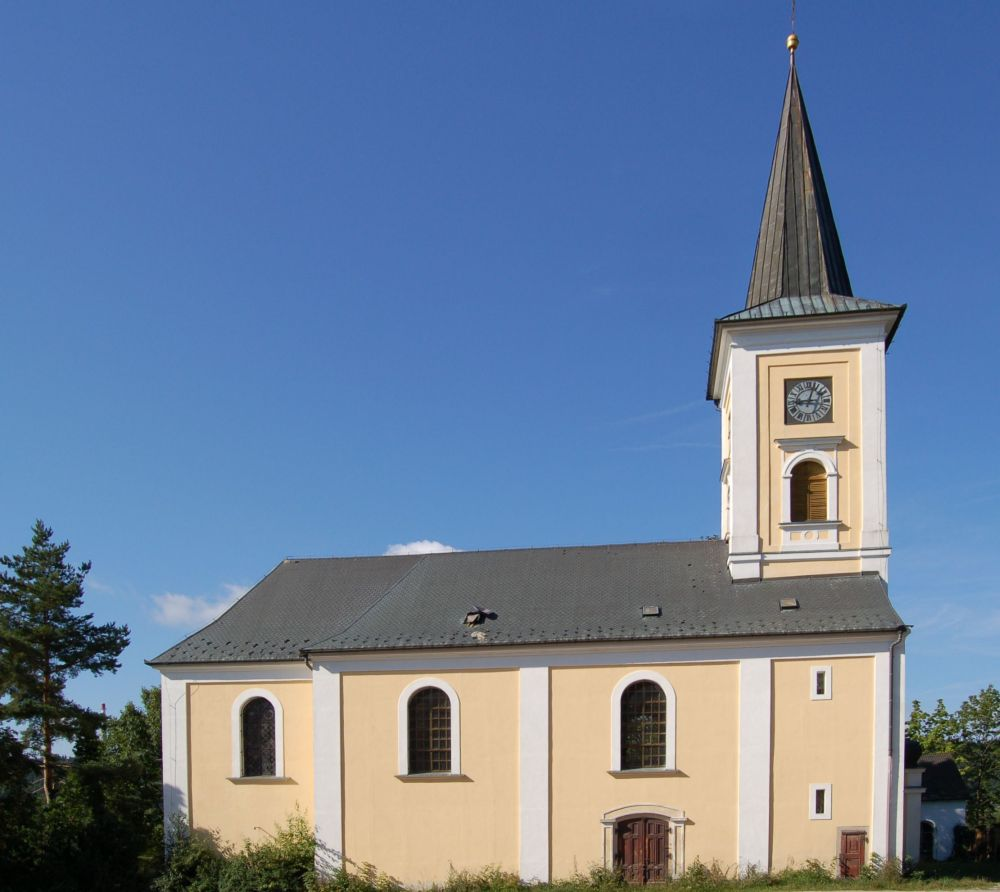
Holy Spirit church in Rýnovice

The first written mention of Rýnovice is from 1559, but the village may be older. Until the end of World War II the village was inhabited mainly by ethnic Germans. The town was known for suffering through frequent fires that may have been related to the large amount of foreign troop movements that it saw during the Thirty Years War, the Napoleonic Wars and the Austro-Prussian War.

The dominant Reinowitz Holy Ghost church dates from 1697 to 1698 and was renovated in 1882 and 1995. Roads joining Reinowitz with the towns of Wemschen, Luxdorf and Reichenberg were built in 1852. The cemetery was dominated by the Priebsch family tomb from 1862 to 1864. In 1900, the village was connected to the tram network of Gablonz an der Neiße. In 1910, Reinowitz was home to nearly 1150 people.

The Munich Agreement permitted Nazi Germany's Adolf Hitler to annex the area, in 1938, into what he called the Sudetenland. There were several small glass works and brickworks. Just before the war began a complex of factories were built, which today is an industrial zone in the town of Jablonec nad Nisou. During World War II, Reinowitz was the location of a subcamp of the Gross-Rosen concentration camp, providing forced labour for the German firm "Feinapparatenbau GmbH". Its prisoners were mostly Poles, but also Czechs, Russians and Germans. Following World War II, in 1945, the town returned to Czechoslovakia and the German inhabitants were expelled under the terms of the Potsdam Agreement and Beneš decrees.

== Present ==
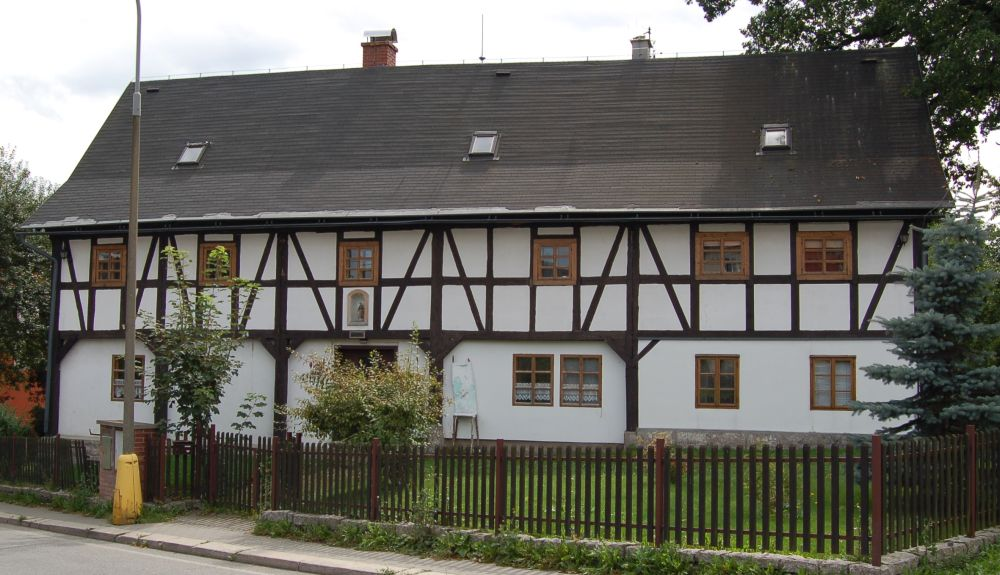
House of Czech-German understanding

Rynovice has become part of the major industrial town of Jablonec nad Nisou. The site of the former LIAZ truck factory, a division of Škoda Auto open from 1952 to 2002, now houses several industrial companies such as TI Automotive and Tedom. The neighbourhood has welcomed a new factory from the company Raymond. Today nearly 2200 people live in Rýnovice. A reconstructed frame house was today houses the "House of Czech-German understanding". In Rýnovice, a prison houses around 500 prisoners.
