= LIAZ 300 series =

Truck manufactured in the Czech Republic

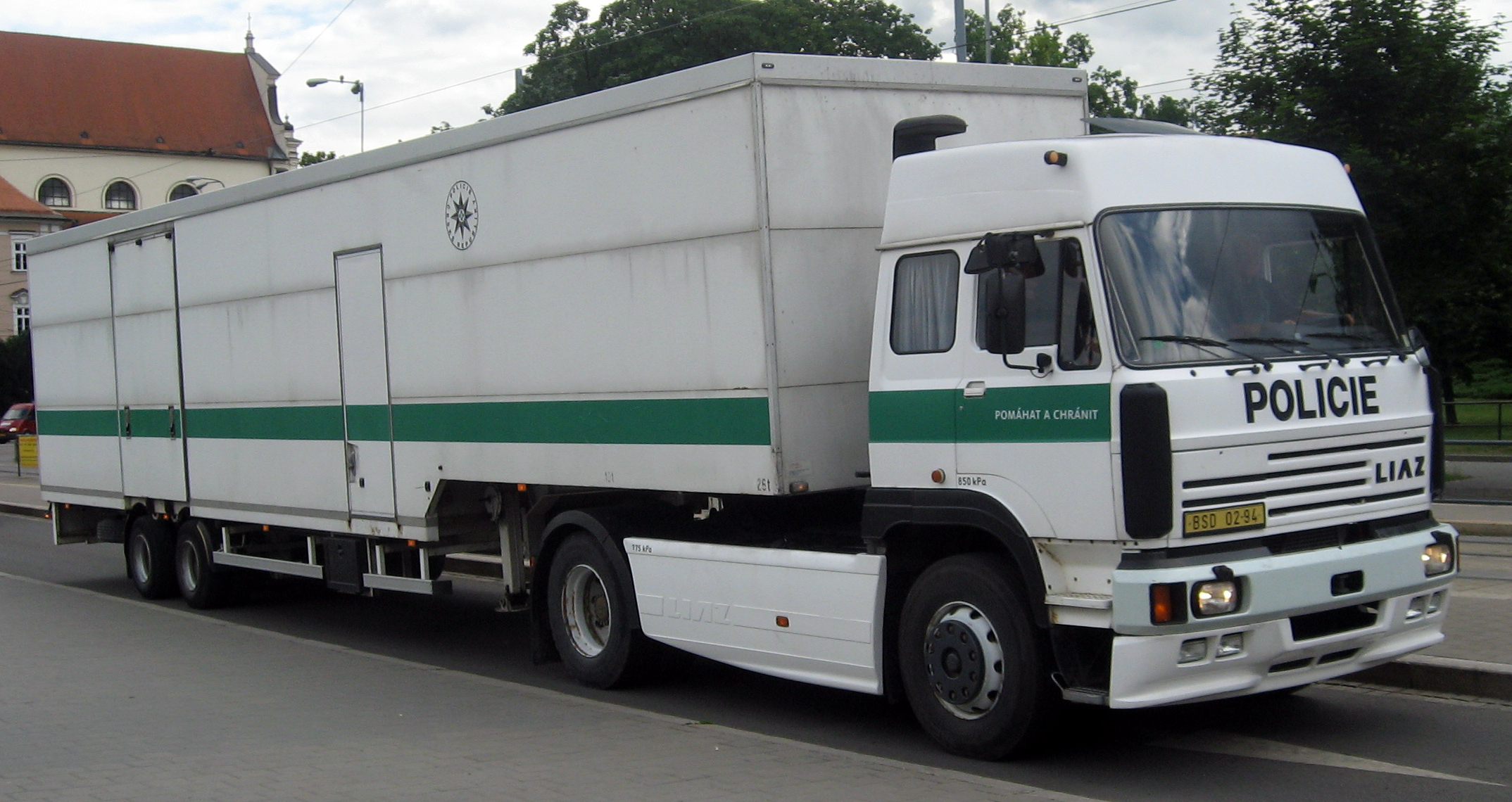
Liaz 300 police truck

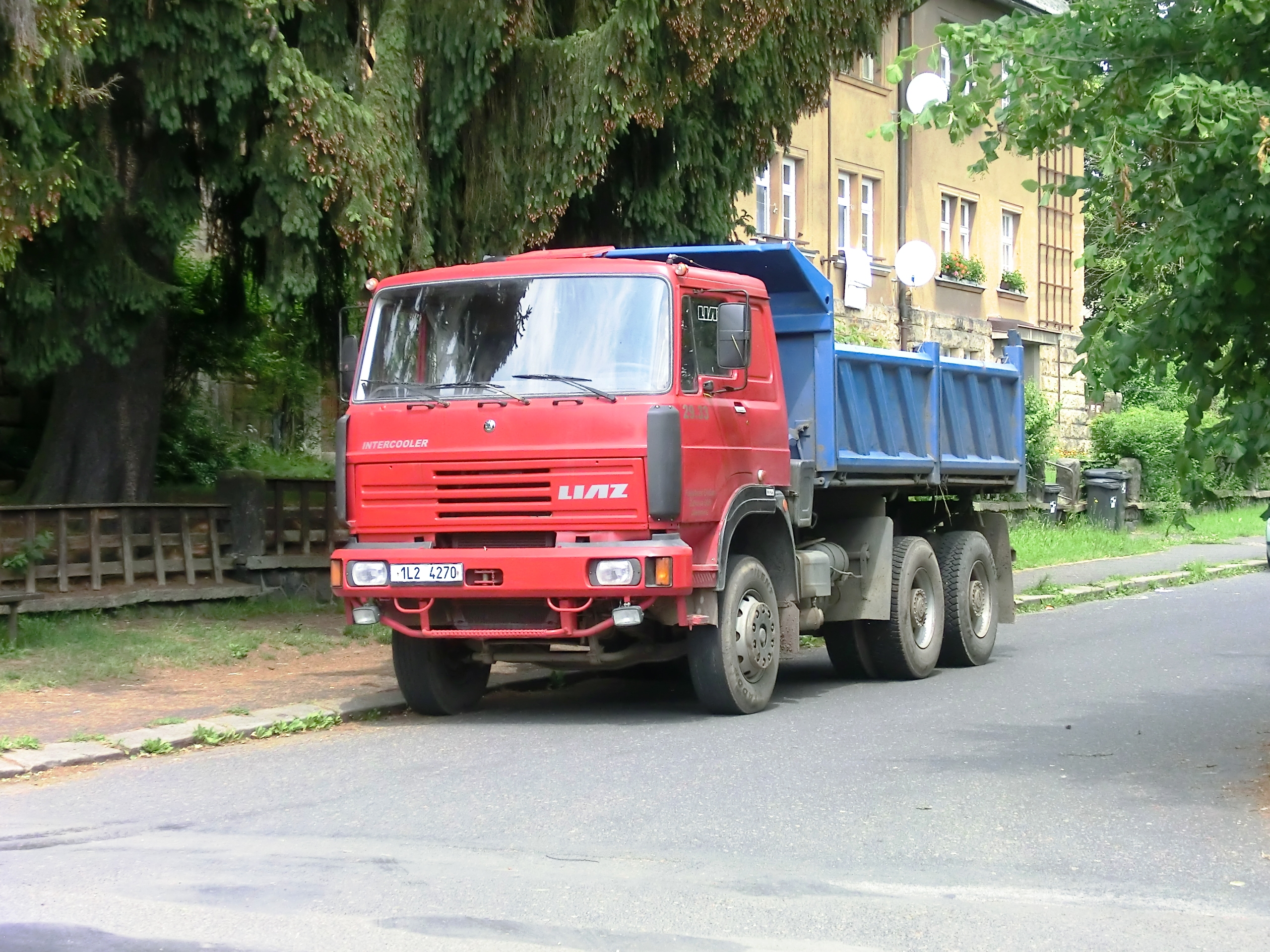
LIAZ 29.33 tipper

LIAZ 300 series trucks were trucks manufactured in Czech company LIAZ. It was based on previous 100 series and 200 series. In contrast to previous council has posed above cabin, plastic moldings under the bumpers, front fenders other, new gearbox, several possible remedies, engines and sizes of cabins and other differences. The series began producing in 1993 and stopped about ten years later. Series 300 is, in terms of number of different variants, a number of diverse production Liaz. A total of 2812 pieces of vehicles series 300 were produced.

== Configuration ==
4x2 – two axles, steerable front, rear driven
4x4 – two axles, front steer, both driven
4x4 AWS – two axles, both controllable, both driven
6x2.2 – three axles, steerable front, middle-powered, rear retractable
6x2.4 – three axles, front and middle steerable rear driven
6x4 – three axles, steerable front, middle and rear driven
6x4.4 – powered front and rear axle. Front and center are controllable.
6x6 – three axles, front steer, all driven
8x4 – four axles. The first two steerable rear two-driven. Prototype

== Cabs ==
short – cab for daily use
middle – cabin with a bed behind the seats
maxi – High cab for the long haul
long – multi crew (up to 9 seats)
short outposts – only special vehicles
short Steyr – for a range of light distribution vehicles S Series

== Racing trucks ==
LIAZ 13.50 PA / J AWS was a special truck produced for the European Championships in Truck-trial. Should have two driven axles which are also steerable. The engine was mounted on the back of the frame abnormally. This car competed in the European Championships in 1995, 1996 and also in several races in 1997. For season 1998 was equipped with a cab of newer 400 series.
The biggest success of the truck 13.50 PA / J AWS
1st place in the European Championship series in truck-Trial 1995

LIAZ 300.471 participated in the series of European Truck Racing Cup in 1996 and 1997. Its predecessor was the type 250,471.
The biggest success of the car 300 471:
3rd place in the series of European Truck Racing Championship 1997
