= LIAZ 200 series =

Series of trucks produced by Czech manufacturer LIAZ from the 1970s to 1990s

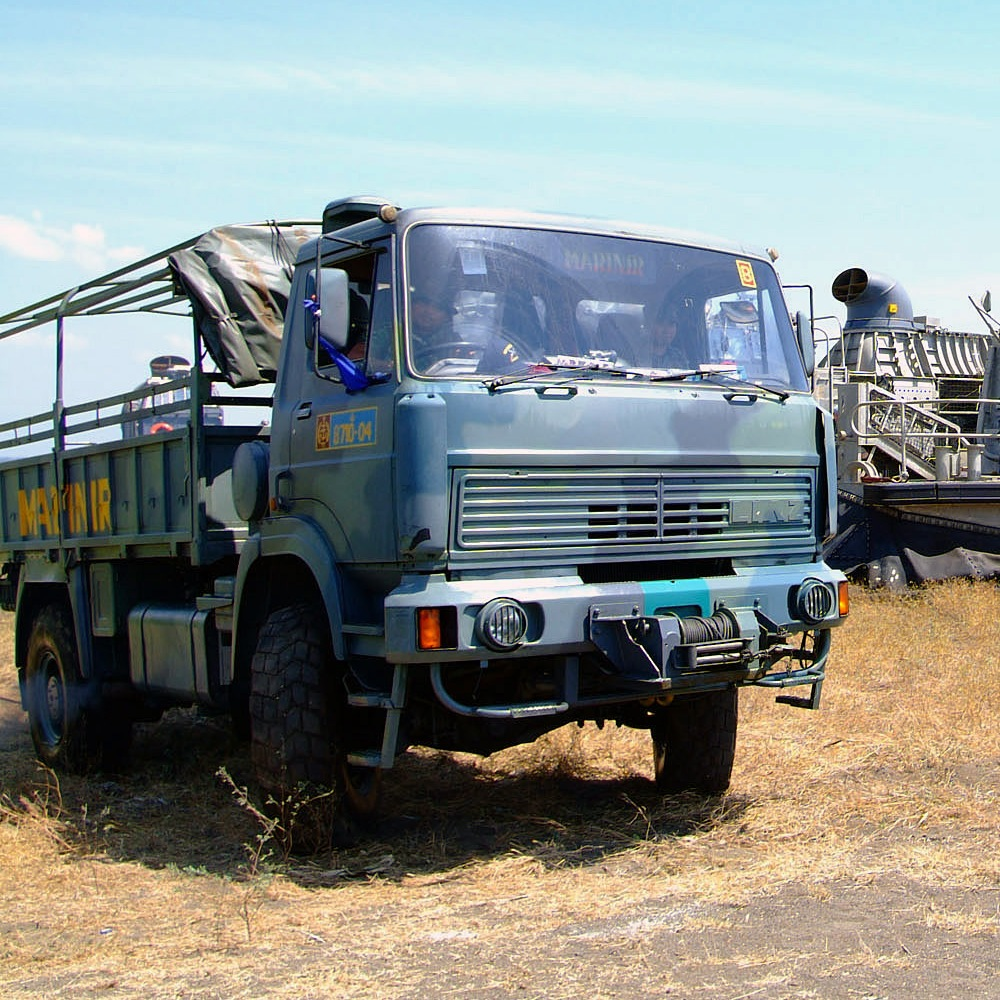
An Indonesian Marine Corps LIAZ truck

The LIAZ 200 series trucks were manufactured by the Czech company LIAZ. It is the only modernisation of LIAZ 100 series and its appearance is almost the same as its predecessor. Produced from 1991 to 1996, 484 pieces were made.

The truck was changed mainly on the technical side: changes were made to the engine, such as its soundproofing and mounting (vertical engine instead of the previous inclined one), the cabin was placed 4 cm higher and had a larger windscreen. Auxiliary covers were placed in the gap above the bumper, which are the most striking visual difference compared to the 100 series. The newer 200s had a new gearbox. The 200 series was followed by the 300 series.

The LIAZ 200 was exported to Indonesia to be used in the local armed forces.
