= Liberecké Automobilové Závody =

Czechoslovak / Czech truck manufacturer

LIAZ
- Type: State-owned enterprise \ Private
- Industry: Automotive
- Predecessor: Reichenberger Automobil Fabrik
- Founded: January 1, 1951; 75 years ago
- Defunct: September 1, 2003; 22 years ago
- Successor: TEDOM Truck
- Headquarters: Jablonec nad Nisou, Czech Republic
- Products: Trucks
- Number of employees: 3,471 (1993)
- Website: www.liaz.cz (in Czech)

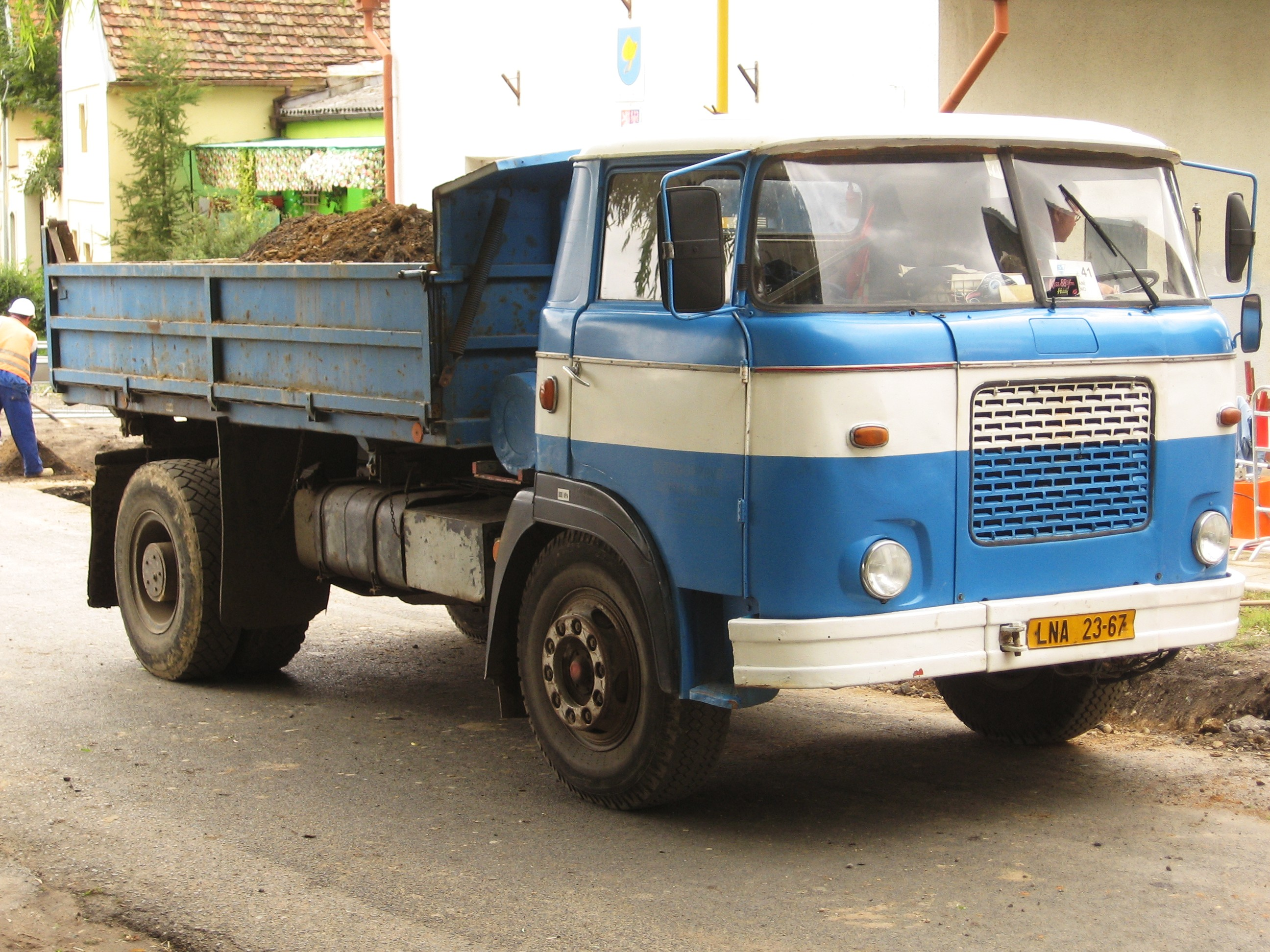
LIAZ 706 MT – one of the most successful series

LIAZ (LIberecké Automobilové Závody – Liberec Automobile Works) was a Czechoslovak (after 1993 Czech) manufacturer of trucks. The company was formed in 1951 by the government as a division of Škoda, incorporating eight other truck manufacturers into a single conglomerate. In 1953, LIAZ became independent of Škoda but continued to use its name until 1984 (Škoda LIAZ). After the 1989 revolution, there was a significant decrease in production.

== History ==
LIAZ's headquarters in Liberec were originally occupied by the former Reichenberger Automobil Fabrik (RAF). RAF opened its Liberec plant in 1907, was bought by Laurin & Klement in 1912, and in 1916 moved its production technology to Mladá Boleslav, leaving Liberec's production facilities to textile entrepreneurs.

Škoda LIAZ's main truck plants were located in Liberec, Rýnovice, Mnichovo Hradiště, and Jablonec nad Nisou. Eventually, factories were opened in Mělník, Zvolen, Veľký Krtíš, Přerov, and Holýšov. LIAZ gradually expanded, employing 11,000 workers and producing 13,600 utility vehicles annually by 1975. In the 1970s, LIAZ was the largest Czechoslovak truck manufacturer, with an annual production of 15,000 trucks and plants operating at full capacity.

However, after the 1989 revolution and subsequent economic problems, LIAZ lost almost all of its sales and was unable to find new customers, leading to a gradual decline in production. Not even the introduction of a new, modern Škoda 400 line (Xena and Fox) could improve the company's fortunes. In 2000, the company was bought by Slovakian Sipox Holding, which lacked sufficient funds to sustain production. Production of LIAZ vehicle ceased in September 2003.

In 2006, Tedom Truck, based in Třebíč, acquired all rights to produce LIAZ trucks, including the factory, technical documentation, and engine production know-how. It produced the Fox model line and modernized older LIAZ vehicles. However, the company went into liquidation on January 1, 2010. Due to financial difficulties, only 19 vehicles were produced annually out of the planned 5,000, with only nine being modernized LIAZ models.

The LIAZ brand was acquired by the Czechoslovak Group, and on December 22, 2017, LIAZ Trucks was established.

== Trucks ==
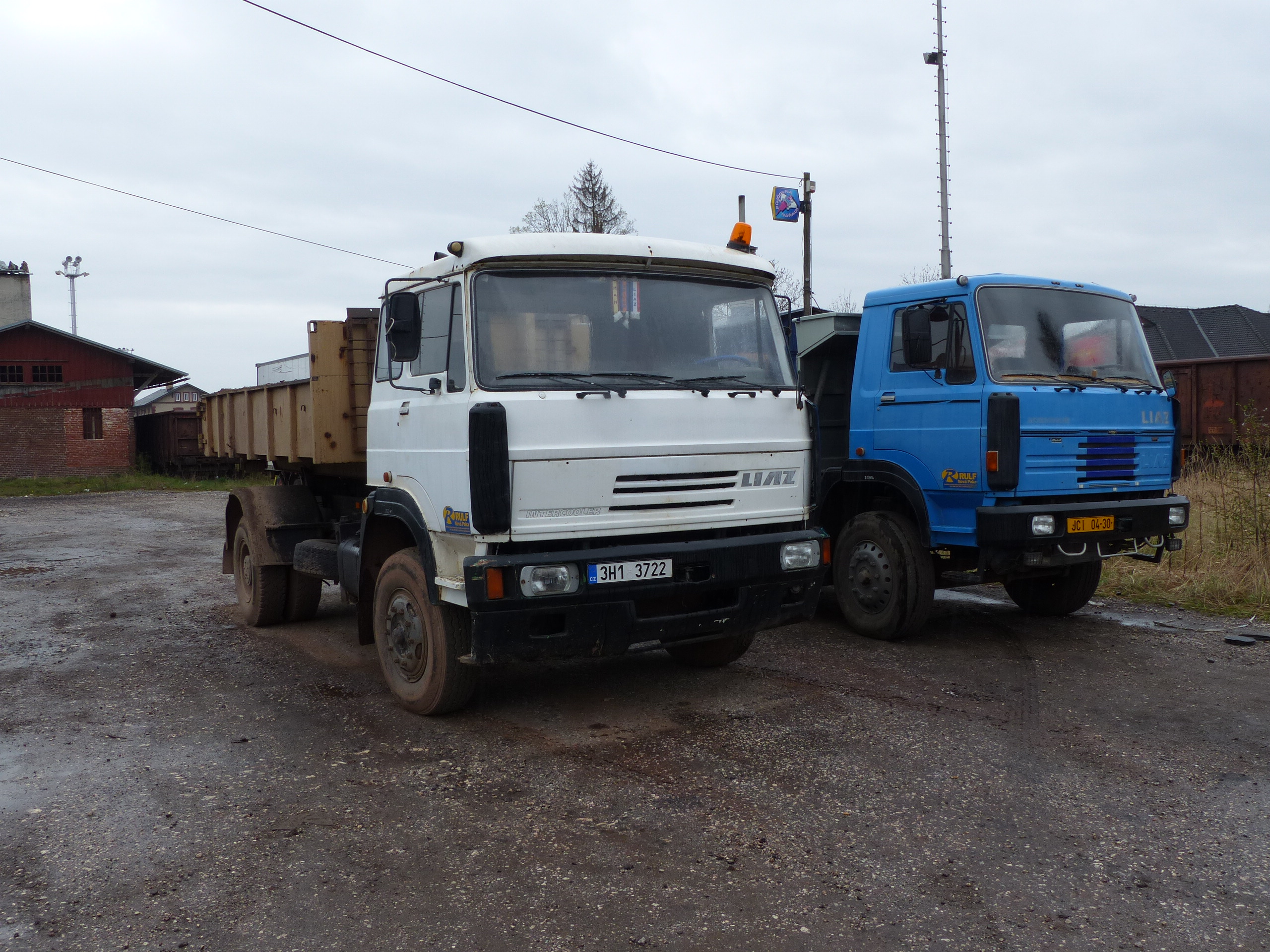
LIAZ 110 (white) and LIAZ 150 (blue)

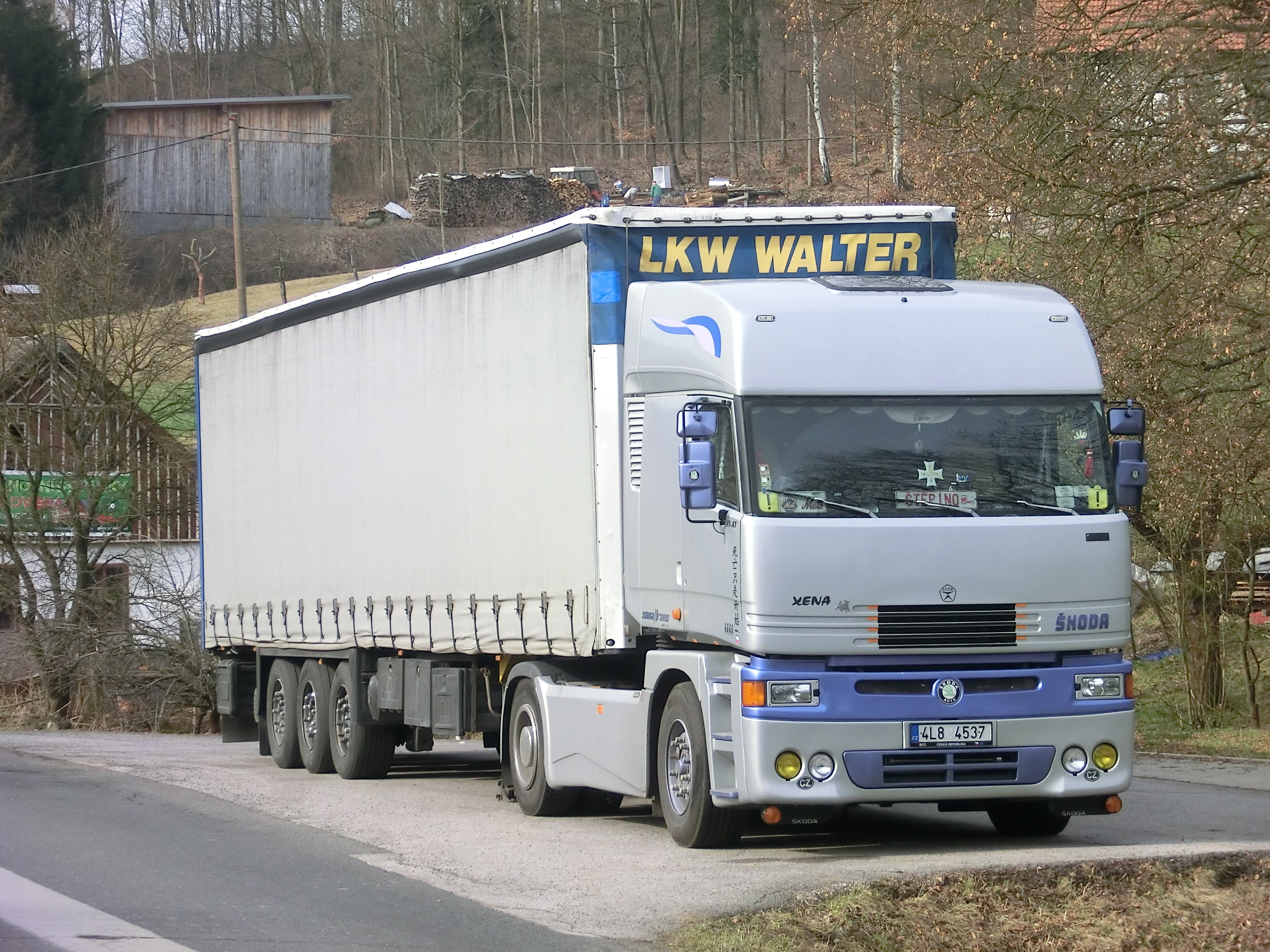
LIAZ 400 - Škoda Xena

- 1940–1952 - Škoda 706 D
- 1952–1958 - Škoda 706 R, developed from the pre-war 706 D
- 1957–1990 - Škoda 706 RT - a cab-over design with LIAZ' own 12-liter inline-six of the M 634 series
- 1969–1990 - Škoda 706 MT - used the frame, engine, and cab of the RT, but was intended for special uses. They were fitted with splitter transmissions and planetary drive rear axles, all to increase max loads.
- 1974–2003 - 100 series
- 1990–1995 - 200 series
- 1992–2003 - 300 series
- S
- FZ
- 1996–2003 - 400 Xena/Fox (tractor/truck)
- The engine plant of LIAZ trucks has been purchased by TEDOM Trucks which has also purchased all the technical data and drawings and is now marketing LIAZ Concept Trucks under the brand of FOX. In the late nineties, LIAZ in Jablonec and Nisou was mainly producing diesel engines that were assembled and tested at the industrial estate.
- The engine line production actually tested every single engine by running it and collecting various parameters about it. Every n-th engine was sent to disassembly to check for any engine tolerances. The testing rigs were called Brzda (brake) where the engine was connected to fuel, exhaust extraction piping, and electronic probes.
- The industrial estate of LIAZ has also been used for the production of steam which is routinely used to heat housing estates. This highly pressurized steam is piped to smaller transformer stations around the town of Jablonec nad Nisou. In the transformer stations, the pressure is reduced and used for heating blocks of flats.

=== Products ===
==== R series (1952–1958) ====
Name	Type	Axles	Drive	Cab
ŠKODA 706 R	Drop side truck	2	4x2	Short
ŠKODA 706 RS	Tipper	2	4x2	Short
ŠKODA 706 ROK	Garbage truck	2	4x2	Middle

==== RT series (1957–1990) ====
Name	Type	Axles	Drive	Cab
ŠKODA 706 RT	Drop side truck	2	4x2	Middle
ŠKODA 706 RTTN	tractor	2	4x2	Middle
ŠKODA 706 RTS	Tipper	2	4x2	Middle
ŠKODA 706 RTHP	Fire truck	2	4x4	Double cab

==== MT series (1969–1990) ====
Name	Type	Axles	Drive	Cab
ŠKODA LIAZ 706 MTC	Drop side truck	2	4x2	Middle
ŠKODA LIAZ 706 MTTN	Truck tractor	2	4x2	Middle
ŠKODA LIAZ 706 MTSP	Tipper	2	4x4	Short

==== 100 series (1974–2003) ====
Name	Type	Axles	Drive	Cab
ŠKODA LIAZ 100.47	Truck tractor	2	4x2	Middle
ŠKODA LIAZ 100.05	Drop side truck	2	4x2	Middle
LIAZ 111.054	Drop side truck	2	4x4	Middle
LIAZ 122.053	Drop side truck	3	6x2	Middle
LIAZ 151.261	Tipper	2	4x4	Short
LIAZ 101.860	Fire truck	2	4x4	Special

==== 200 series (1990–1995) ====
Name	Type	Axles	Drive	Cab
LIAZ 230.573	Truck tractor	2	4x2	High
LIAZ 230.073	Drop side truck	2	4x2	High
LIAZ 250.261	Tipper	2	4x2	Short
LIAZ 251.154	Army truck	2	4x4	Short
LIAZ 232.471	Truck tractor	3	6x2	Middle

==== 300 series (1992–2003) ====
Name	Type	Axles	Drive	Cab
ŠKODA LIAZ 18.33 TBV	Truck tractor	2	4x2	High
ŠKODA LIAZ 18.29 PB	Drop side truck	2	4x2	Middle
ŠKODA LIAZ 18.29 SA	Tipper	2	4x4	Short
ŠKODA LIAZ 18.29 XA	Fire truck	2	4x4	Special
ŠKODA LIAZ 24.33 PZV	Drop side truck	3	6x2/2	High
ŠKODA LIAZ 24.23 KYV	Garbage truck	3	6x2/4	Middle
ŠKODA LIAZ 29.33 SD	Tipper	3	6x4	Short
ŠKODA LIAZ 29.33 SDA	Tipper	3	6x6	Short
ŠKODA LIAZ 40.33 SC	Tipper	4	8x4	Short
ŠKODA LIAZ 12.18 PB/S	Delivery truck	2	4x2	Short Steyr

==== 400 series (1996–2003) ====
Name	Type	Axles	Drive	Cab
ŠKODA Xena	Truck tractor	2	4x2	High
ŠKODA Fox	Tipper	2	4x2	Short

==== TEDOM 400 (2006–2009) ====
Name	Type	Axles	Drive	Cab
TEDOM Fox	Tipper	2	4x4	Short
TEDOM Fox 6x4	Tipper	3	6x4	Short

== Motorsport ==
=== Notable achievements of LIAZ in motorsport ===
==== Paris-Dakar and other rallies ====
- 1985 – first Czech team on Rallye Dakar
- 1985 – 1st place on Rallye des Pharaons (category: trucks over 12 t), Heritier-Kovář-Brzobohatý
- 1987 – 3rd place on Rallye Dakar, Moskal-Joklík-Záleský
- 1987 – 1st place on Rallye Jelcz, Krejsa-Brzobohatý-Joklík
- 1988 – 2nd place on Rallye Dakar, Moskal-Vojtíšek-Záleský
- 1988 – 1st place on Rallye Jelcz, Svoboda-Fajtl-Joklík
- 1992 – 1st place on Rallye des Pharaons (category: trucks over 12 t), Kakrda-Fajtl-Joklík
- 2009 1st place on Baja Spain, Macík-Macík jr.-Kalina
- 2009 – 2nd place on Baja Hungaria, Macík-Macík jr.
- 2012 – 3rd place on Rally El Chott, Spáčil-Vodrhánek-Chytka

==== European truck racing championship ====
- 1987 – first Czech team in European championship
- 1989 – 2nd place in European championship (class: A), Frankie Vojtíšek
- 1989 – 1st place in Great Britain Championship, Frankie Vojtíšek
- 1990 – 2nd place in European championship (class: A), Frankie Vojtíšek
- 1990 – 1st place in Great Britain Championship, Frankie Vojtíšek
- 1990 – 2nd place in 24h truck race Le Mans
- 1993 – 3rd place in European championship (class: B), Frankie Vojtíšek
- 1994 – first Czech truck in class Super Race Truck
- 1997 – 3rd place in European championship (class: Race Truck), Frankie Vojtíšek

==== European truck-trial championship ====
- 1991 – first Czech team in European championship
- 1991 – 1st place in European championship (class P2), Kakrda – Král
- 1992 – 1st place in European championship (class P2), Kakrda – Birke
- 1993 – 1st place in European championship (class S3), Filip – Joklík
- 1995 – 1st place in European championship (class P2), Filip – Záleský
