= Reichenberger Automobil Fabrik =

Automobile manufacturer

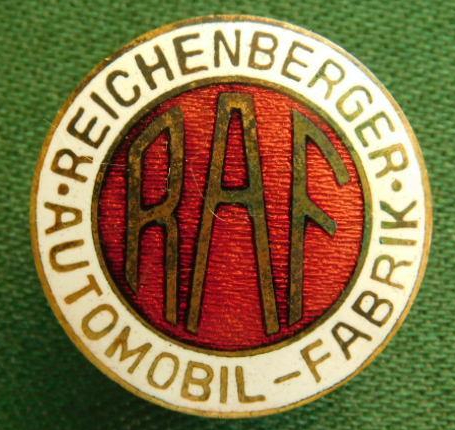
- Company type: Private company
- Industry: Automotive
- Founded: 1907
- Founder: Theodor Liebieg
- Defunct: 1916; 110 years ago
- Fate: Reincorporated (1912 or 1913)
- Successor: Laurin & Klement
- Headquarters: Liberec (Reichenberg), Kingdom of Bohemia, Austria-Hungary

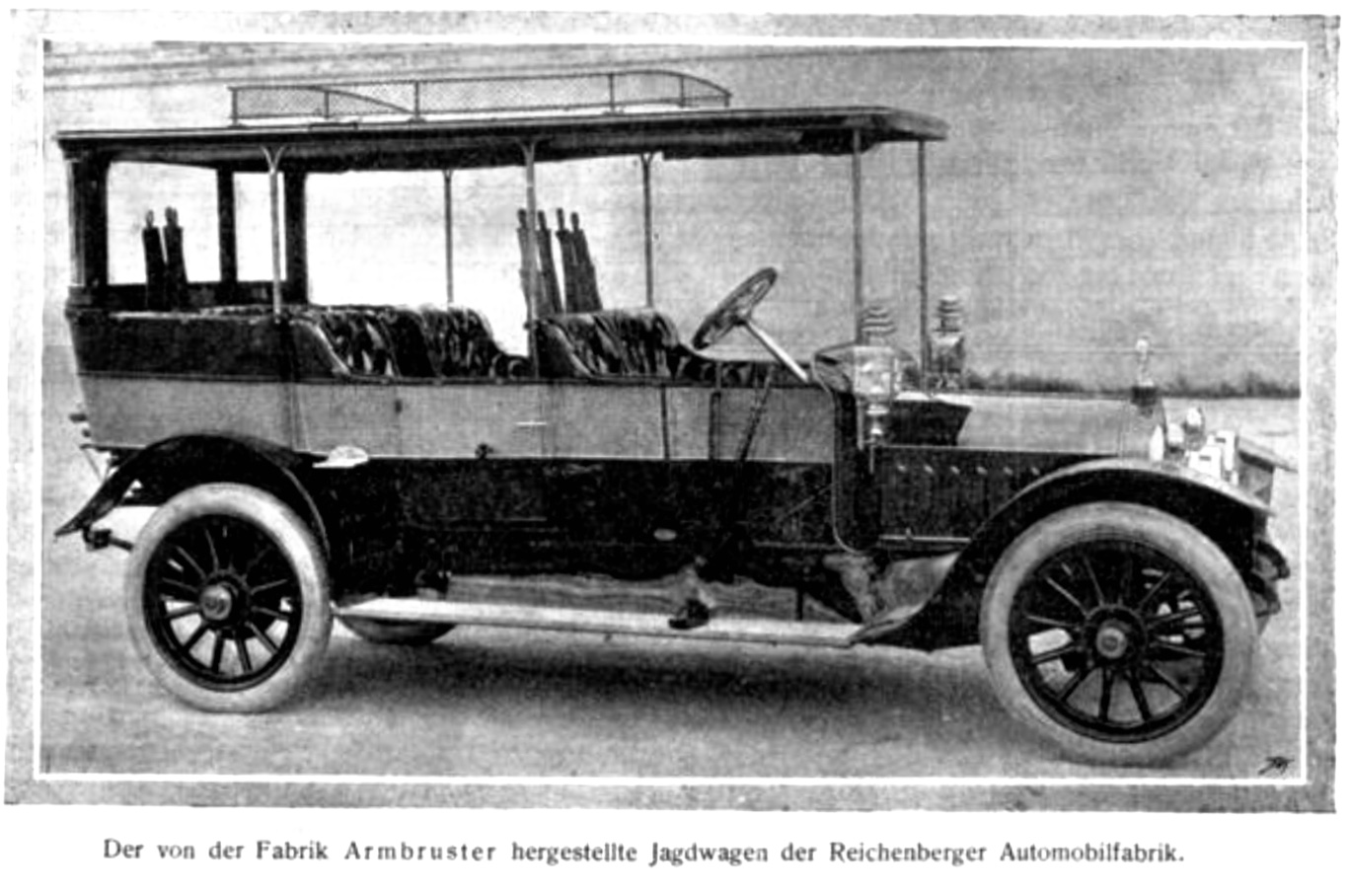
Reichenberger Automobil Fabrik 30/35 hp (1910)

Reichenberger Automobil Fabrik ('Reichenberg Automobile Factory', RAF) was an automobile manufacturer founded in 1907 in Liberec (formerly Reichenberg) by local industrialist and automobile enthusiast Theodor Liebieg in the village of Rosenthal (later Liberec district of Růžodol). Between 1907 and 1916, when RAF was incorporated by Laurin & Klement automobile company, about two to three thousand automobiles under its brand were produced.

== History ==
In 1907, Theodor Liebieg, grandson of successful Liberec textile entrepreneur Johann Liebieg and also the first owner of the car in the Czech lands, together with his partners Alfred or Willi Ginzkey from Vratislavice nad Nisou and Oskar von Klinger from Nové Město pod Smrkem, founded the Reichenberg Automobile Factory, R. A. F. The company bought previously existing Linser engine factory in Liberec, Barvířská street No. 18. Company founded by Christian Lisner produced from 1902 motorcycles under the brand Zeus and in 1906 it presented the Linser Voituretta car at the Vienna Motor Show. After complicated, six-month negotiations, Liebieg managed to buy out the car division so that in 1907 Linser withdrew from car production and left it, including the technical documentation, to the newly founded RAF car company.

Some of the first two factory models, RAF 24/30 HP and RAF 8/10 HP, were built in former Lisner factory in 1908, shortly thereafter, the factory built a brand new facility in the open land in Růžodol (Rosenthal) near Liberec. To compete the growing number of car manufacturers of that era, espetialy Laurin & Klement company located in about 50 kilometres distant Mladá Boleslav, RAF constructed and produced quite rich offer of vehicle models, including small passenger cars, luxury big limousines, trucks, ambulances, fire trucks or omnibuses being exported for example to German or Russian Empire. Individual bodies were built by specialized companies, among which the Petera and Sons bodywork workshop from nearby town of Vrchlabí. In 1908 RAF cars attended the first Prinz-Heinrich-Fahrt race in Germany.

In 1910, German constructor Paul Henze entered the company. With increasing demands on business activities, the company was transformed to limited liability company in 1911. At the instigation of its designer J. Laviolette, the RAF company concluded a contract with the Daimler Co. Ltd. in Coventry in 1912 for the licensed production of valveless Knight slide valves. According to Daimler terms, only one company could own a license in each country. Having this exclusivity RAF then designed four new automobile types with Knight engines producing them in hundreds. Knight engines were also supplied to the Puch company in Graz, but the cooperation with this company did not prove to be effective.

In the period before World War I, Reichenberg Automobile Factory was one of the largest automobile manufacturers in the Czech lands and enriched the market with a number of types of passenger and commercial vehicles. Despite its very good reputation, the factory merged in 1912 or 1913 due to financial problems with the Laurin & Klement company, which also took over the license for Knight engines. Theodor Liebieg then became a member of the board of directors of the Laurin & Klement company, but he did not prevent the cessation of automobile production in Liberec in 1916.

During the years 1907–1913, more than 10 types of cars were produced. Of the RAF cars produced (the total number is estimated at two to three thousand units), only a minimum of them have survived. It is estimated that around 10 cars in total survived, two of which are in the Czech Republic, and the rest of which are abroad.

== Models ==
- RAF 10/30 HP (1907)
- RAF 24/30 HP (1907)
- RAF 14/18 HP (1909)
- RAF FW 25 (1909)
- RAF H 10 (1909)
- RAF 40 HP Cardan Omnibus (Charabancs, 1910)
- RAF 24/28 HP (1911)
- RAF 10/12 HP (1911)
- RAF 40/45 (1913)
- RAF-Knight 30/35 HP (1912)
- RAF-Knight 10/30 HP (1912, later produced as Laurin & Klement OK)
- RAF-Knight 10/40 HP (1912)
- RAF-Knight 18/50 HP (1913, later produced as Laurin & Klement RK)

== Gallery ==
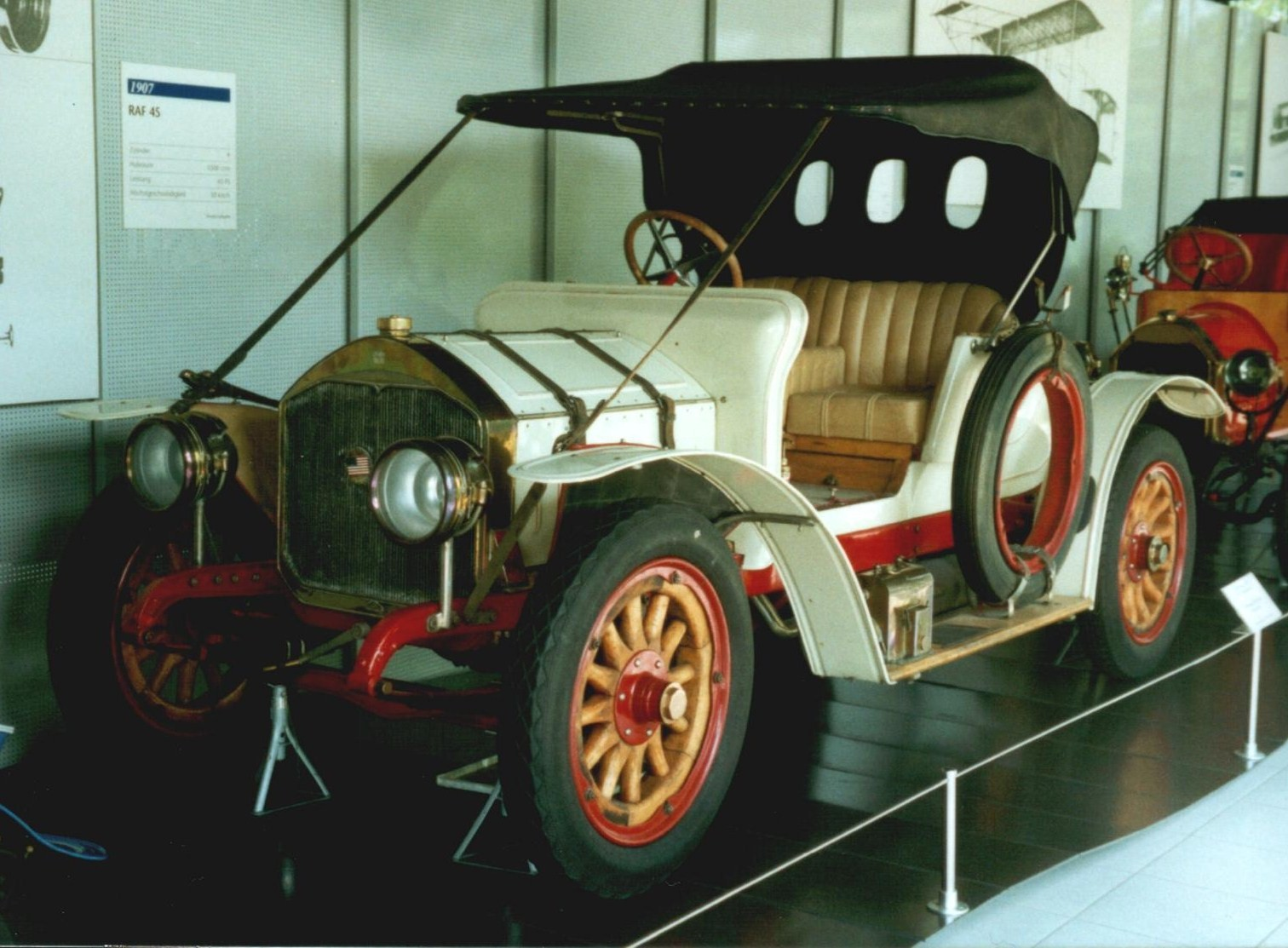
RAF 24/30 HP from 1907

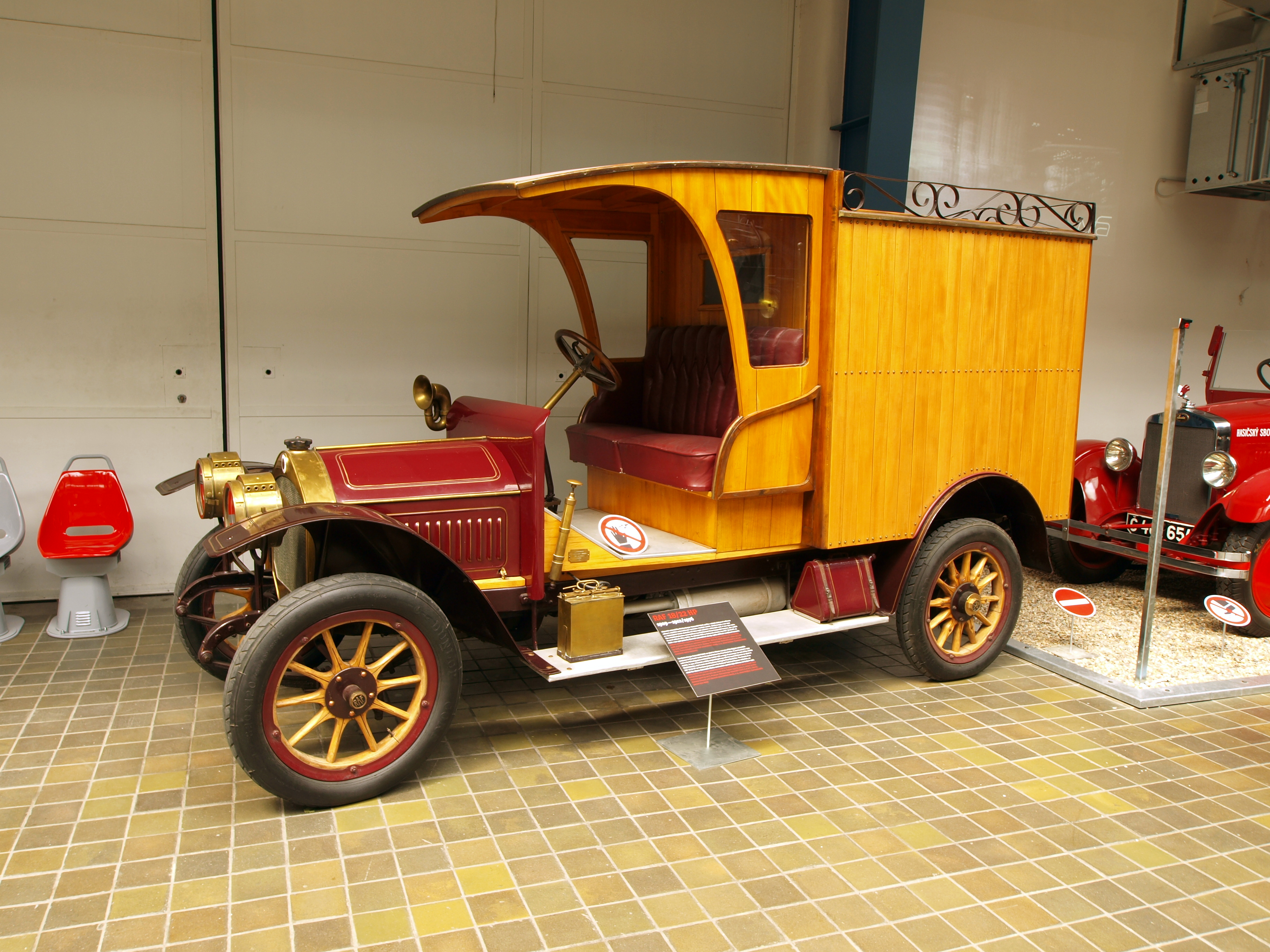
RAF FW 25 (1909-1912), replica on chassis RAF 18/22 HP

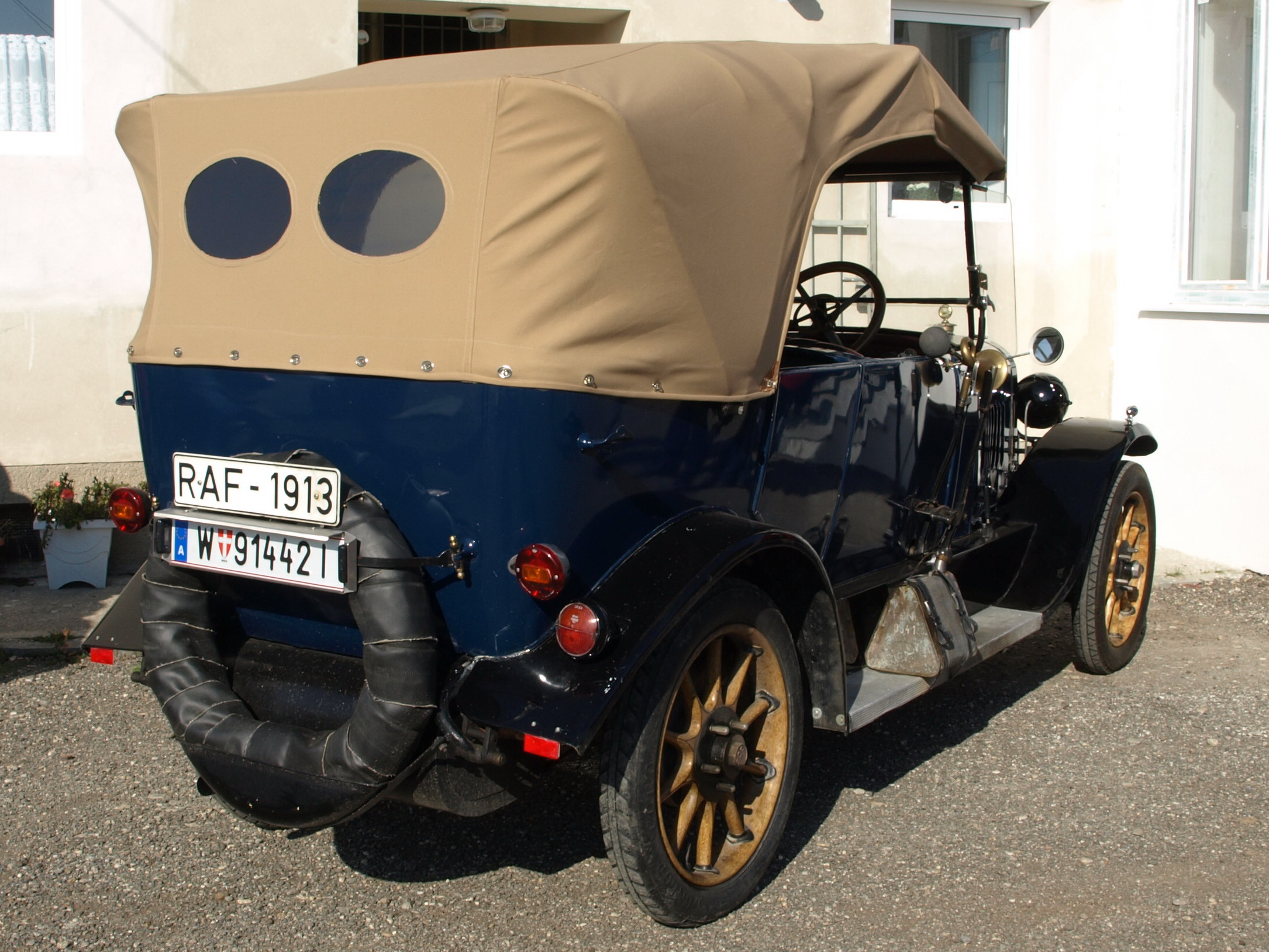
RAF 13/40 HP (1913)

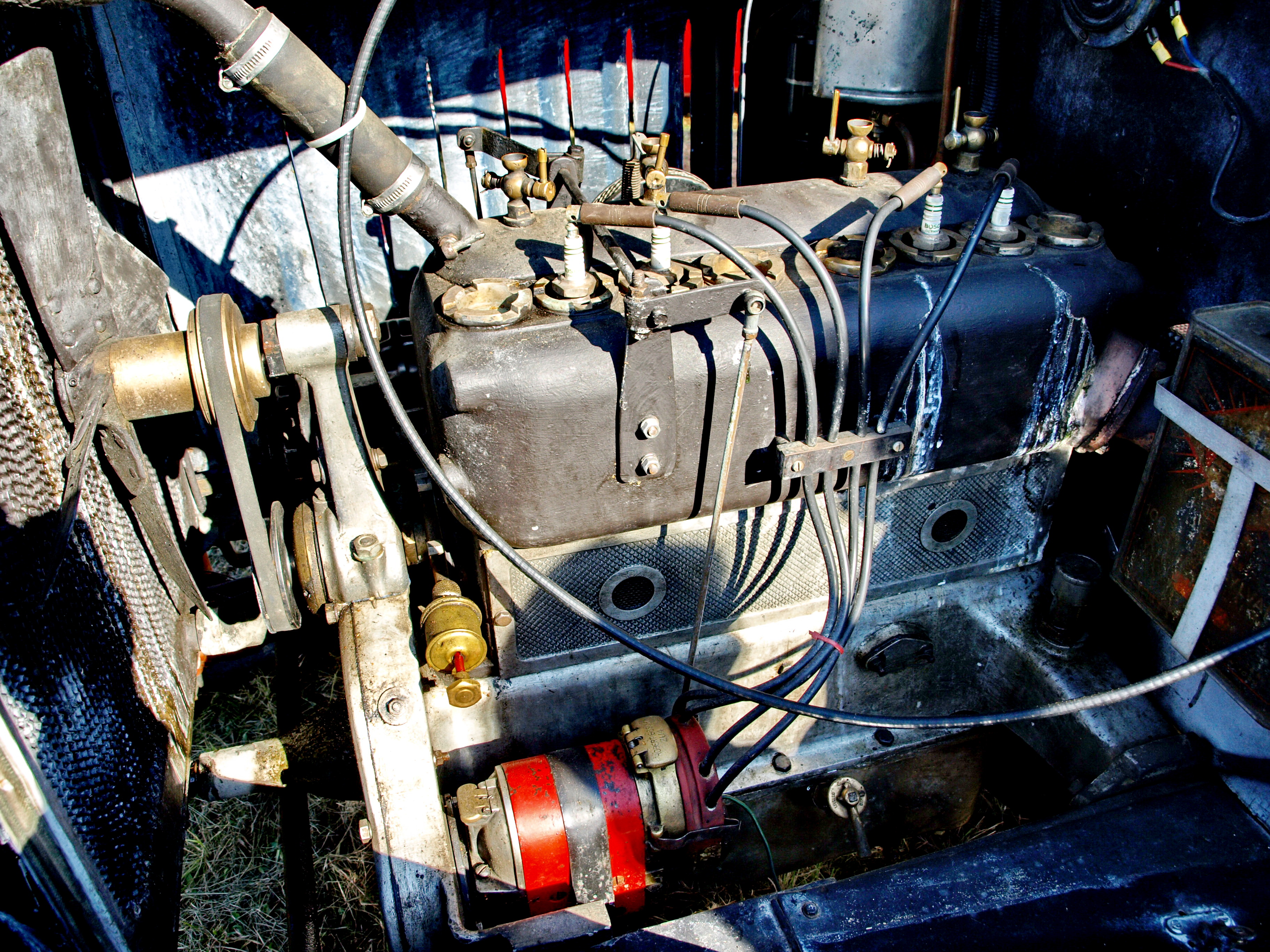
Motor RAF-Knight (1913)

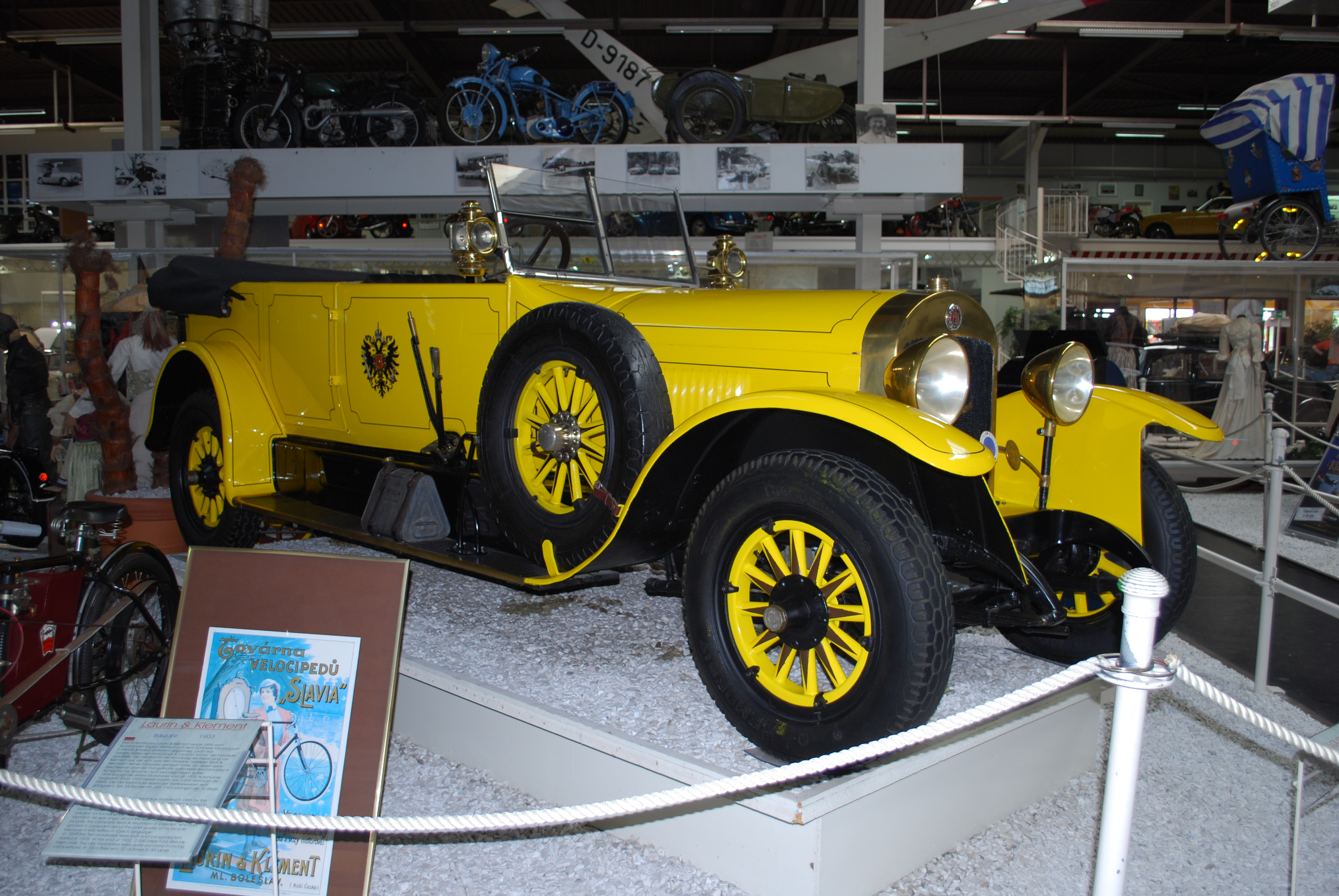
RAF 18/50 HP (Laurin & Klement RK from 1916)

== See also ==
- Liberecké Automobilové Závody
