= LIAZ 100 series =

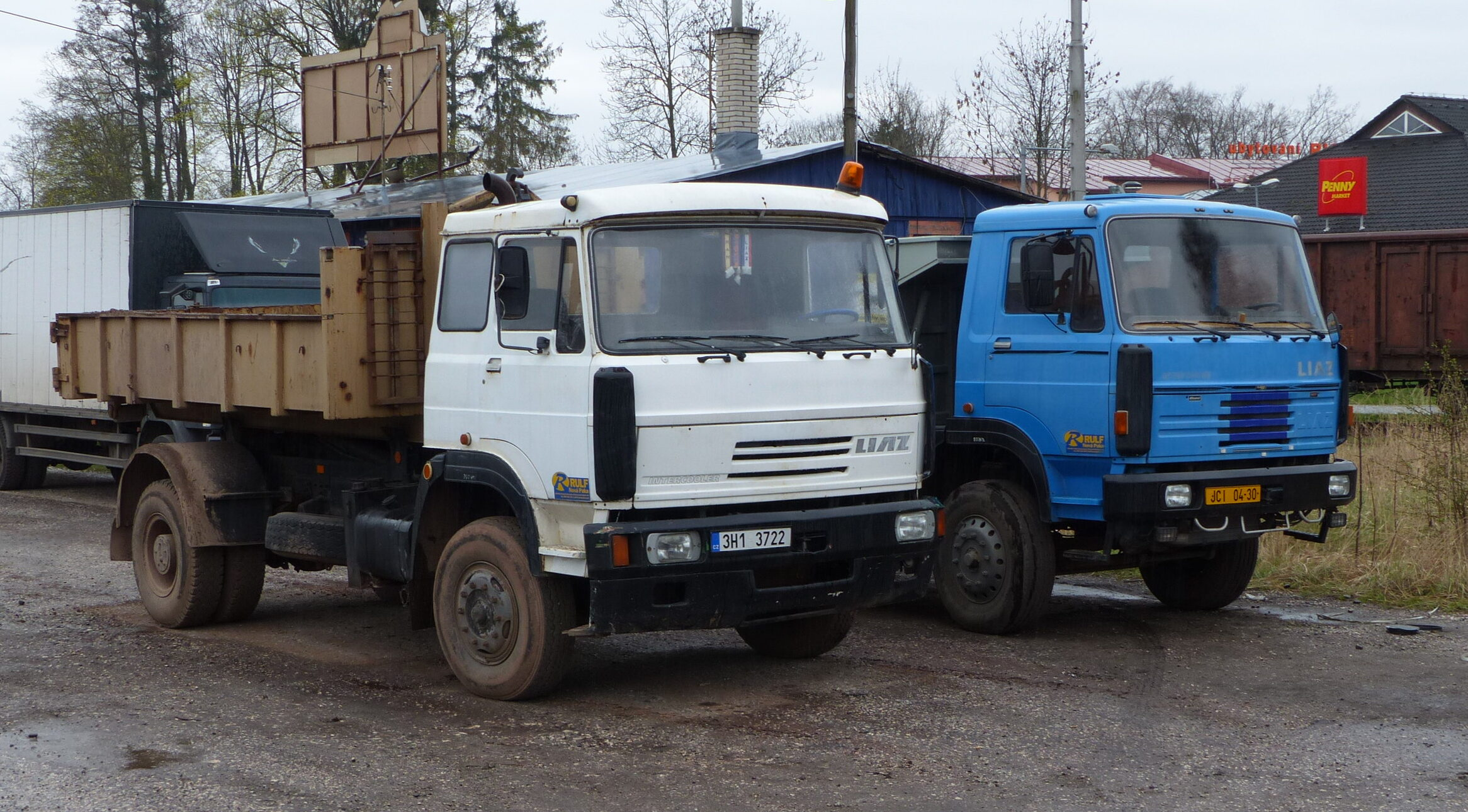
- LIAZ 110.051 + LIAZ 150.261

Overview
- Manufacturer: LIAZ
- Production: 1974 - 1994
- Assembly: Czech Republic: Jablonec nad Nisou and Mnichovo Hradiště; Slovakia: Zvolen (LIAZ 06 plant); Bulgaria: Shumen (Madara)

Body and chassis
- Class: Truck
- Body style: COE; Cab forward

Powertrain
- Engine: Diesel naturally aspirated or turbocharged I6 1974 - 1994
- Transmission: Praga 9 - speed manual Praga 10 - speed manual ZF 16 - speed manual

Chronology
- Predecessor: LIAZ MT
- Successor: LIAZ 200 series

LIAZ MŠ 634

Overview
- Manufacturer: LIAZ

Layout
- Configuration: I6

Combustion
- Fuel type: Diesel fuel
- Cooling system: Water-cooled

Output
- Power output: 148 kW (198 hp) - 224 kW (300 hp)
- Torque output: 900 N⋅m (660 ft⋅lbf)

Dimensions
- Dry weight: ~ 900 kg (1,984 lb)

LIAZ 100 series is a collective term for several modifications of truck made by LIAZ company in Czechoslovakia, later Czech Republic in town Jablonec nad Nisou between 1974 and 1994.

== Development ==
In LIAZ started the development of a new series already in the 60s, but due to problems with the supply was made just upgraded a number of LIAZ RT and LIAZ MT. Originally intended transient model, which should produce only temporary, eventually to be replaced by LIAZ 100 and in 1974. Versions with special cabin were labeled number 110th

New LIAZ have compared to 706 RT completely new engine, transmission, cab and axle meets the requirements of customers and time. Development effort thwarted complications with suppliers and so was in 1969 Transitional Council MT with new engines and axles.

Since 1974, gradually started the production of trucks 100.45, 100.05 flatbed and other variants of vehicles from 100 series. The first trucks were obliquely motor M series with a volume of 11 940 cm³ and a power of 210, in 1978 was refurbished and known as M1 and in 1988 was again modernized to M2. New units reached thanks to turbo power up to 236 kW (320 hp), and longevity to overhaul 420,000 km. New and were 9 and 10-point synchronized gearbox Praga. Modernization in 1984 brought tilting cab and air suspension front and rear axles.

Produce began Tippers 150 (4×2) and 151 (4×4) chassis 111 (4×4) and 122 (6×2) for the superstructure. Other enhancements to Series 100 has received since 1989, when the market opens increased competition. In the menu, so there was a new 16-speed gearbox ZF, remote cabin with high roof MAXI braking system ABS, central lubrication, electric mirrors and windows, cooling box or ISRI seats.

Production Series 100/110 was terminated after 20 years of production in 1994, but according to customer orders were implemented until the end of the company's existence.

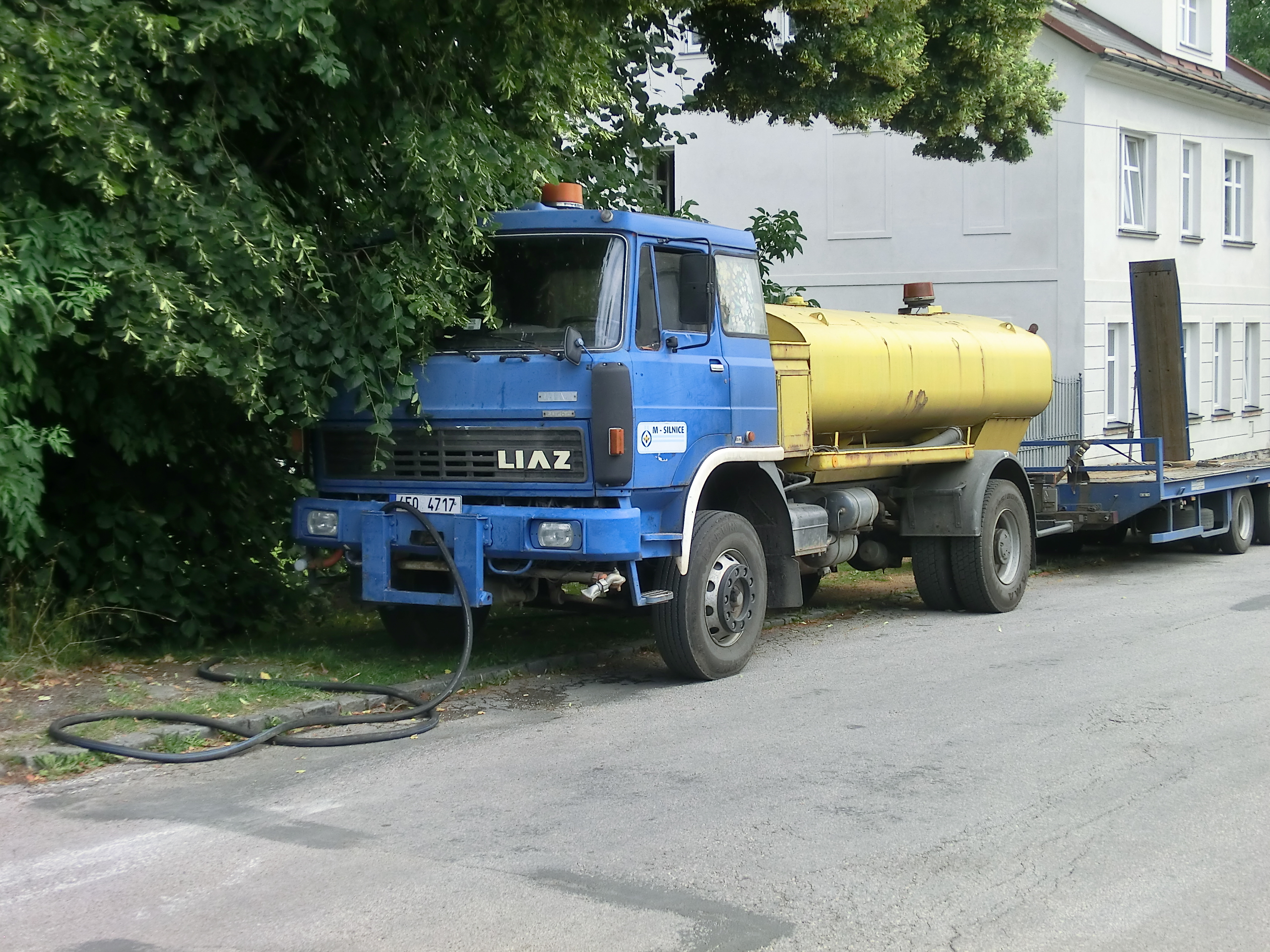
LIAZ 110 as tank

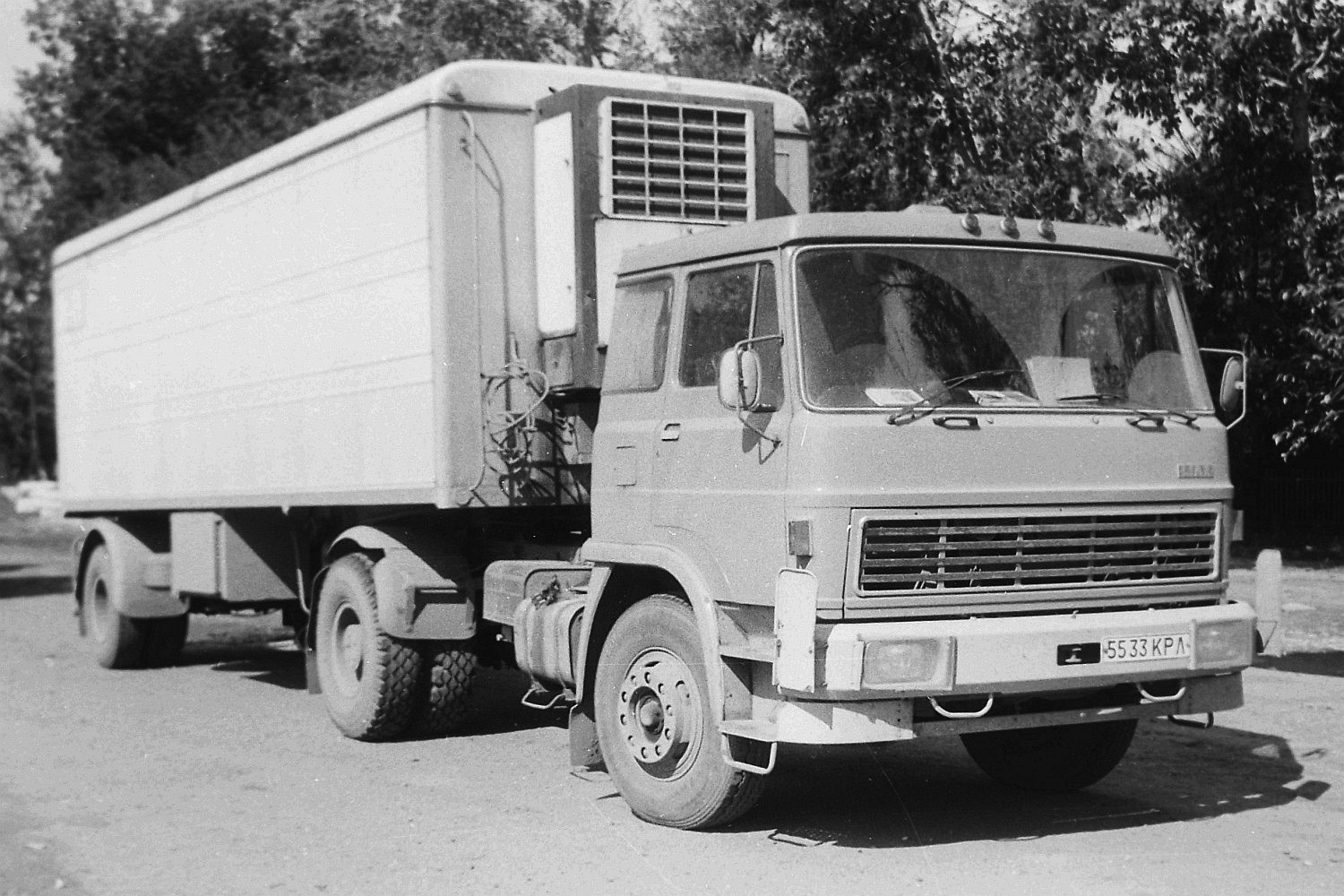
LIAZ 100.42, tractor with Orličan semitrailer

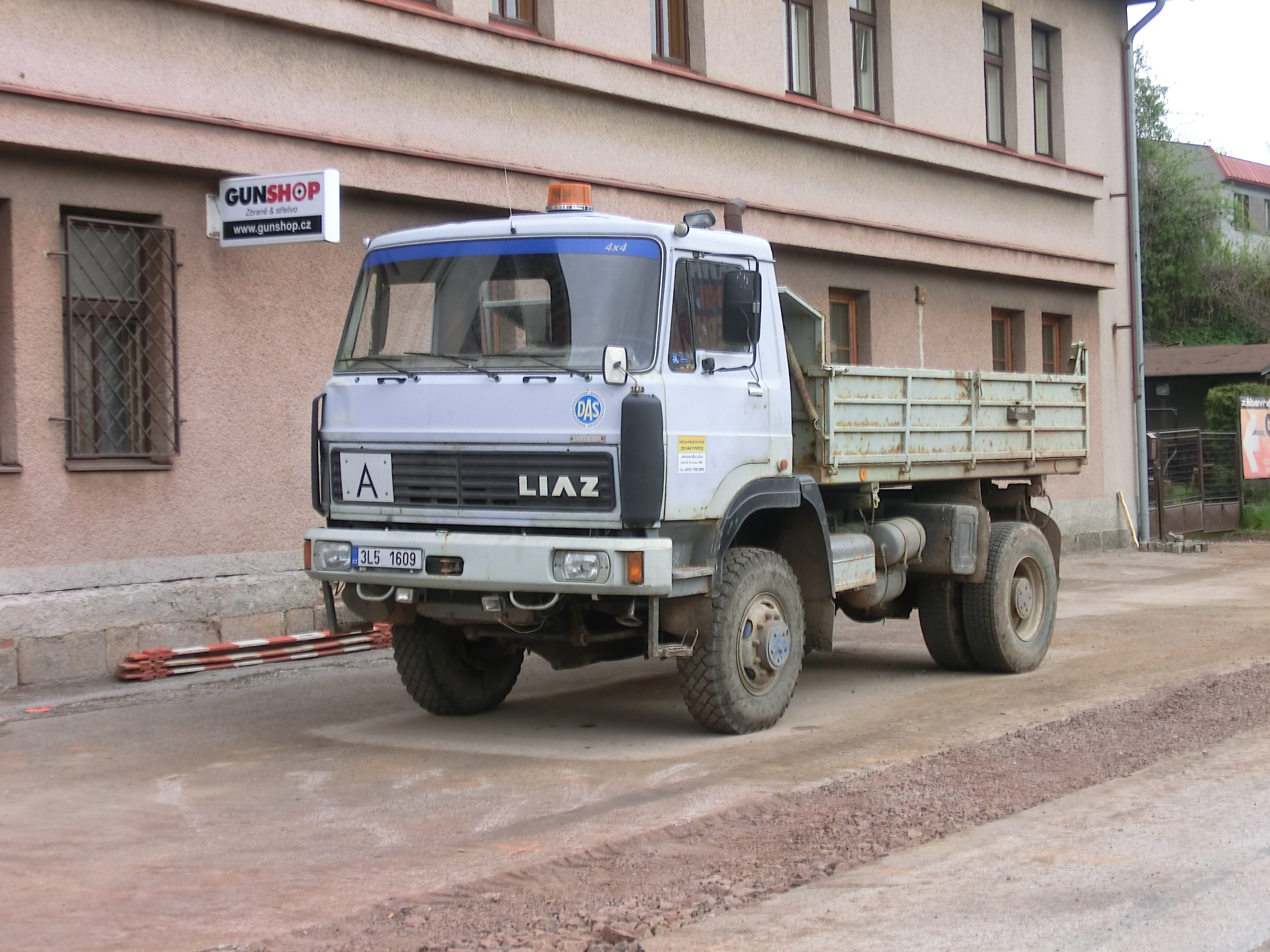
LIAZ 151.261, tipper

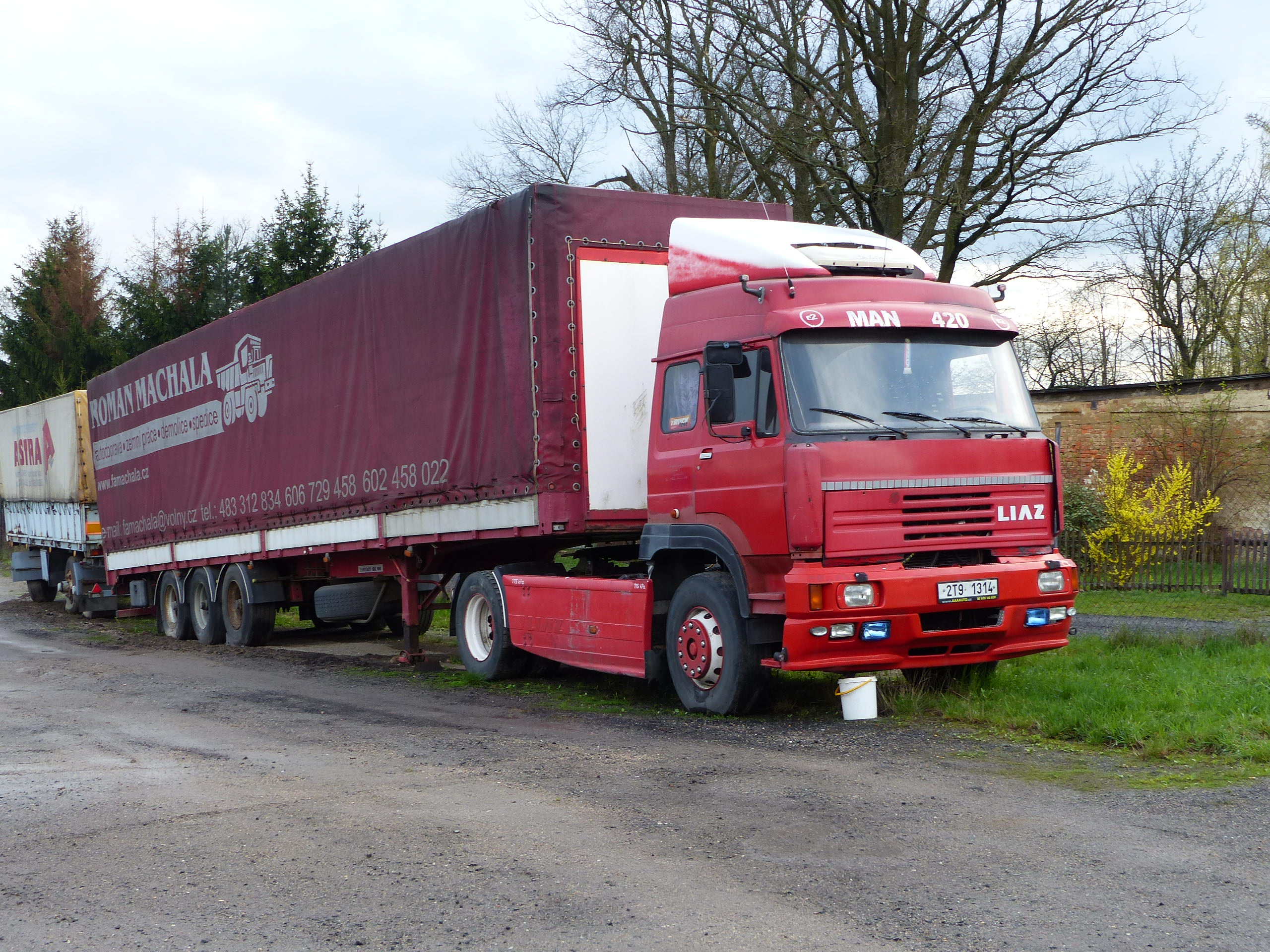
LIAZ 110, tractor unit

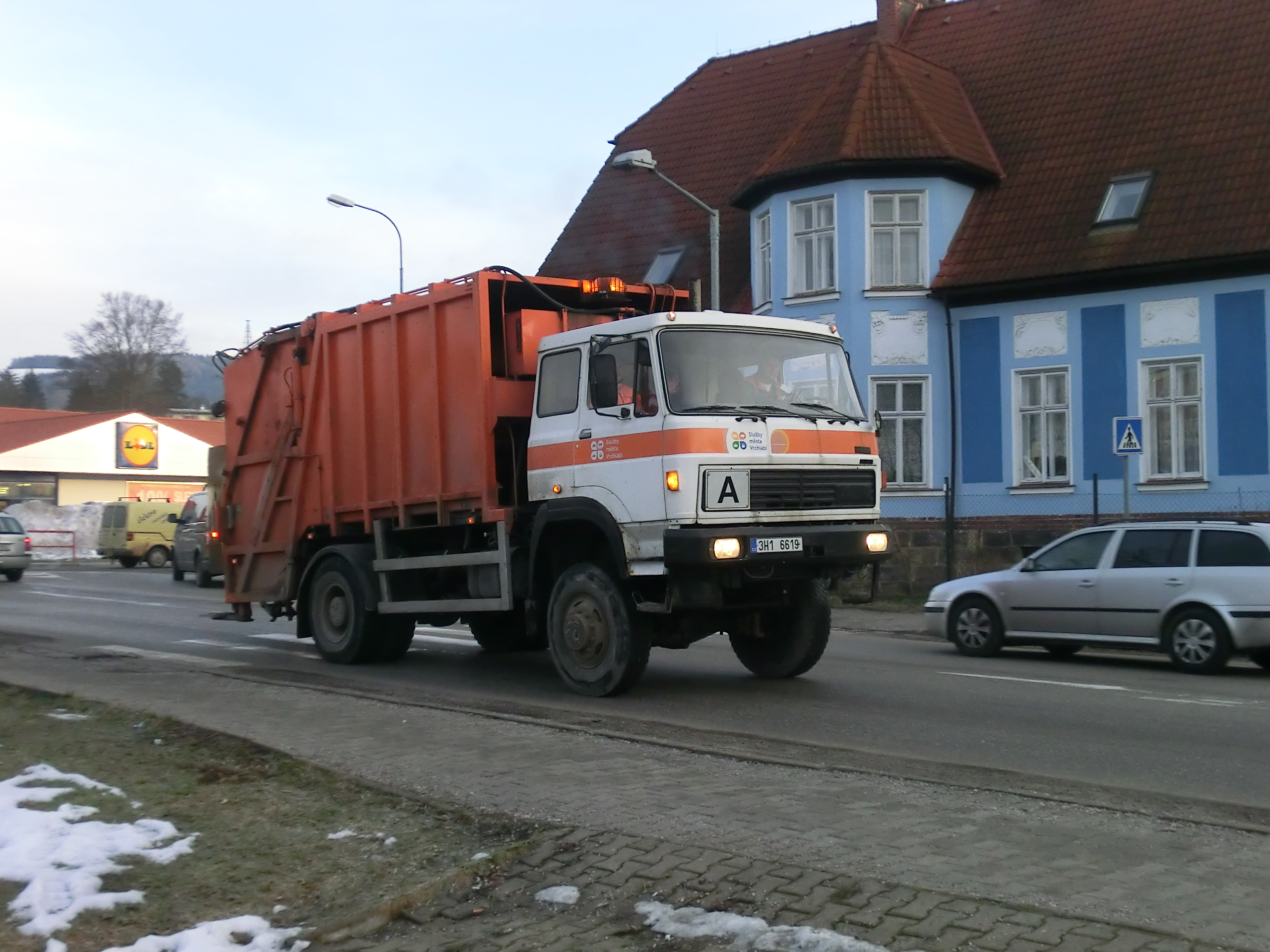
LIAZ 111.840, garbage truck

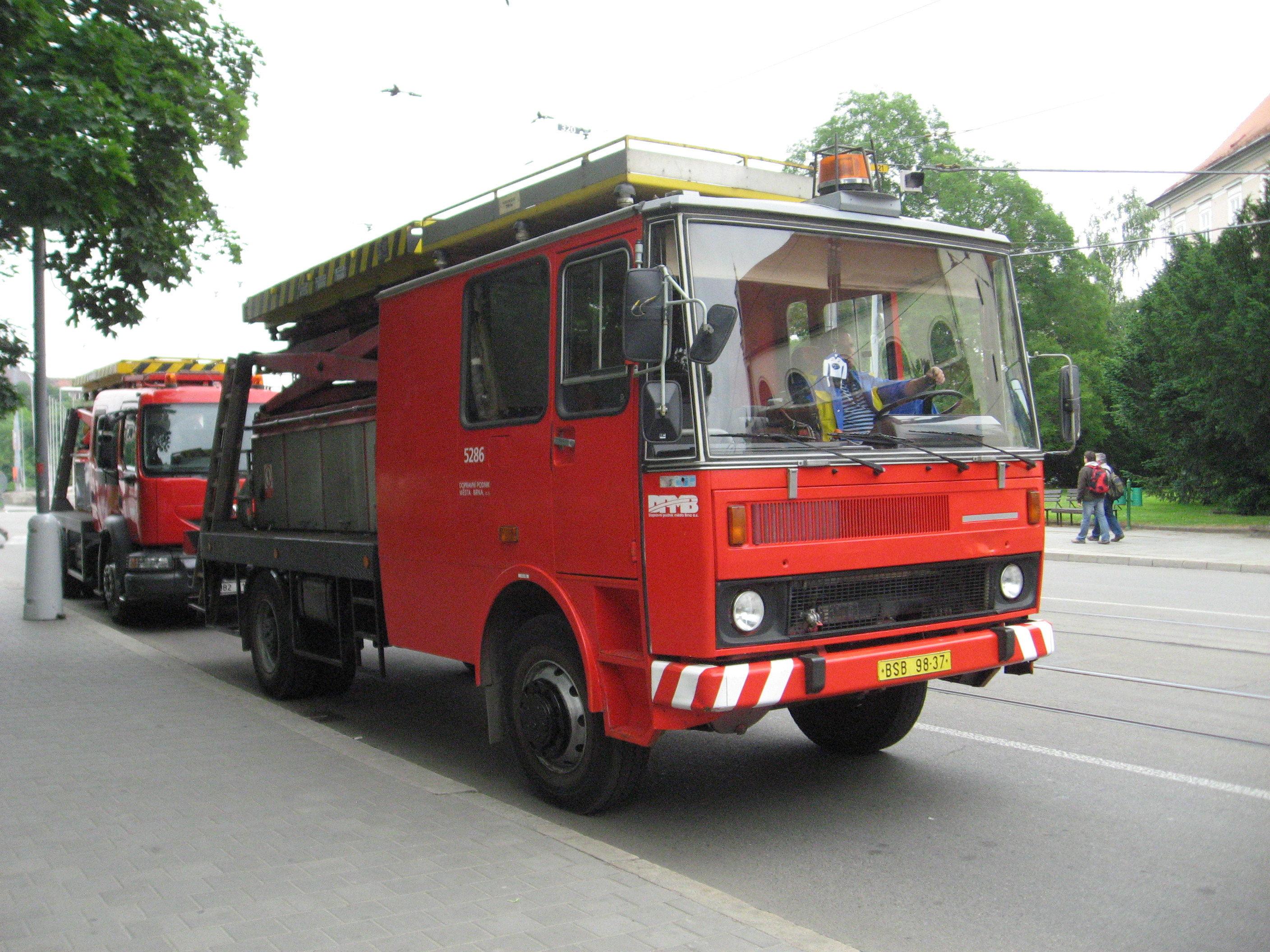
Special version LIAZ 101.860, which has cab unified with Karosa 700 series

== Historical cars ==
- Private collector car (reg. No. 5273, ex DP Brno)

== Configuration ==
Serial

- 4x2 - two axles, steerable front, rear driven
- 4x4 - two axles, front steer, both powered by engine
- 6x2.2 - three axles, steerable front, middle-powered, rear retractable
- 6x2.4 - three axles, front and middle steerable, powered rear

Prototypes and specials

- 6x4 - three axles, steerable front, middle and rear driven

6x4 AGRO - driven front and middle axle. The rear axle is retractable.

- 6x4.4 - driven front and rear axle. Front and center are controllable.
- 6x6 - three axles, front steer, all driven

== Cabins ==
- Middle non folding - original series cab 100
- Short non folding - created small-scale series of secondary contraction cabins
- Middle folding - first modernization mid cabin
- Short folding - cab for daily use
- Middle modernized - the second modernization mid cabin
- maxi - High cab for the long haul
- long - multi crew (up to 9 seats)

== Racing trucks Series 100 ==
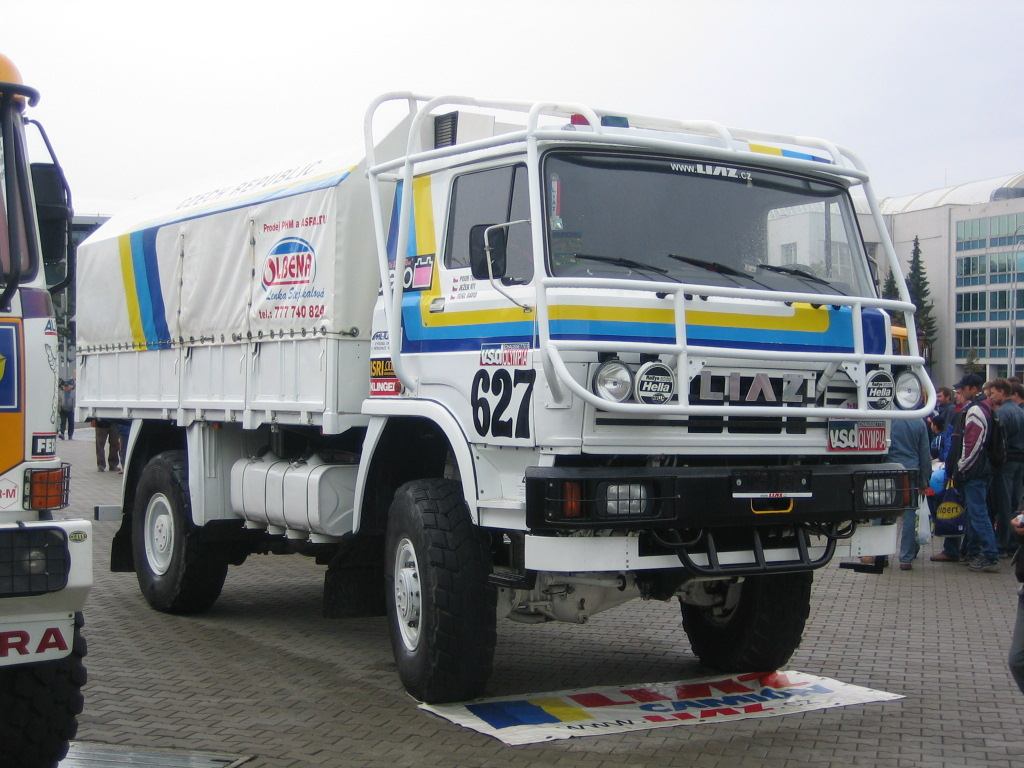
Racing truck for Rally Paris-Dakar

LIAZ 100.55 D was the first Czech truck, which was attended by Dakar Rally, in 1985. The crew Jiří Moskal - Jaroslav Joklík - Radek Fencl finished the race at 13th place in the truck category. The second truck LIAZ crossed the finish line outside the classification.

The biggest success LIAZ 100.55 D

- 13th place on the Rallye Paris-Dakar 1985
- 1st place in the Rallye des Pharaons in the category above 10 tonnes

LIAZ 111.154 is the name field of the truck produced in Czech Republic in the years 1986–1991. Racing version of this car carried the designation 111.154 D and the successor vehicle 100.55 D. At present (2010) it is possible to see the racing variant 111.154 VK on long rallies, including Dakar Rally (e.g., 2009 Dakar Rally and 2010 Dakar Rally). Crew members who brought this car to finish 2010 Dakar Rally in fourth place, were Martin Macík, Josef Kalina and Jan Bervic.

The biggest success LIAZ 111 154 D:

- 3rd place at the Rallye Paris-Dakar 1987
- 2nd place at the Rallye Paris-Dakar 1988
- 1st place in the European Championship series in truck-Trial 1991

1st place at the 1987 Rallye Jelcz 1st place at the 1988 Rallye Jelcz 2nd place in the race Baja Hungaria 2009 1st place in the race Baja Spain 2009 (version 111.154 VK)

LIAZ 110.577 was the first Czech truck in the European Cup Truck Racing Circuit. The first time were the two LIAZ trucks in this series in season 1987. They followed the Jiří Moskal and František Vojtíšek. Moskal won in its first year of tenth place, Vojtíšek was fourteen.

LIAZ 150 571 is the term for race trucks LIAZ years from 1988 to 1992. From 110.577 the previous type differed many technical changes that make it faster and easier to control. The successor type was 250.471.

The biggest success LIAZ 150.571 2nd place in the series of European Truck Racing Cup 1989 1st place in the Championship of Great Britain in 1989 2nd place in the European Cup series tractors 1990 1st place in the Championship of Great Britain in 1990 2nd place in the 24 Hours of Le Mans tractors 1990

== Historical vehicles ==
- Private collector (version flatbed, SPZ UH 78–66)
- Private collector (version tractor, SPV 06V 0119)
