= Lukášov =

- Village
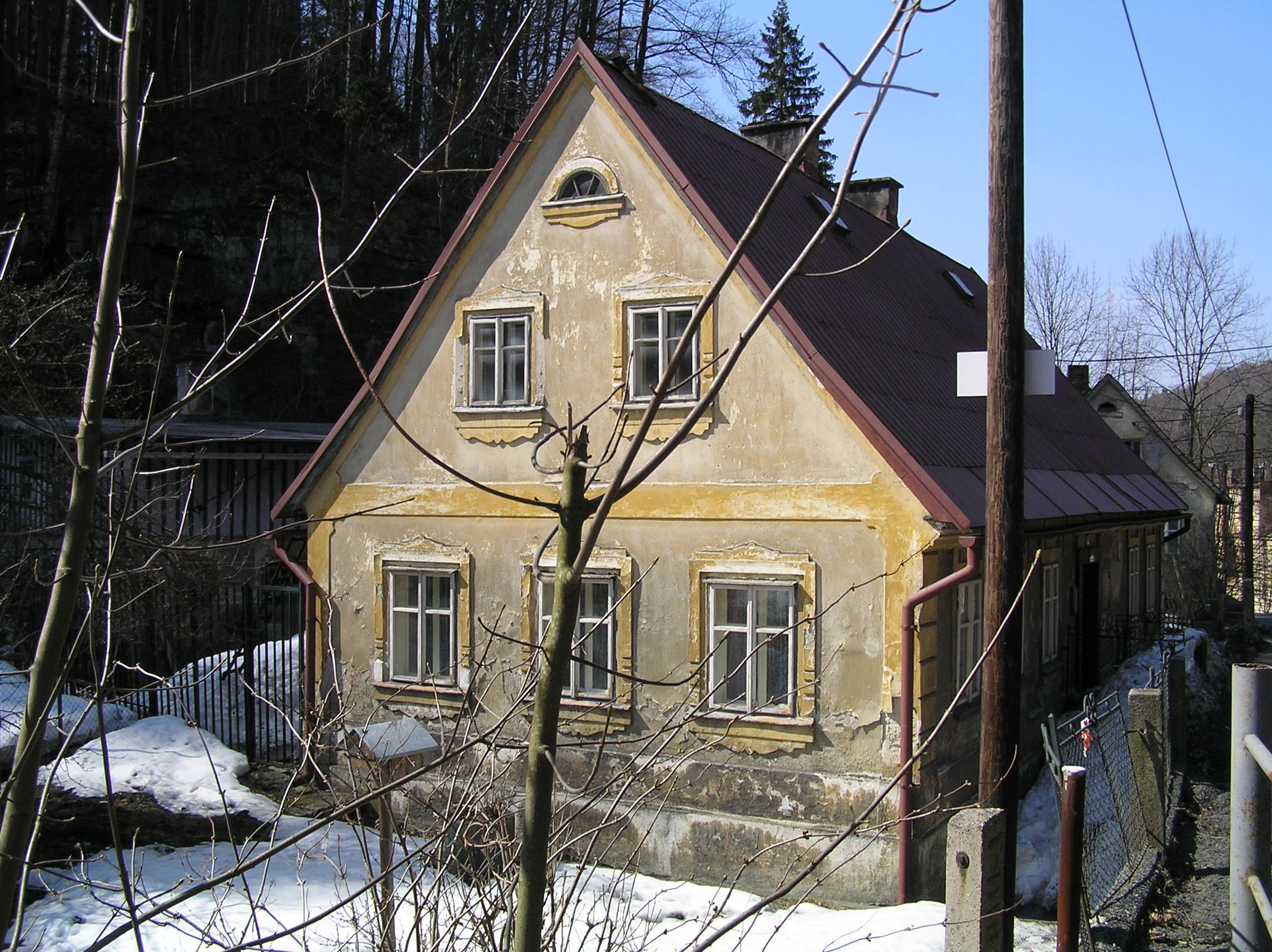

- Location in the Czech Republic
- Coordinates: 50°44′58″N 15°8′21″E
- Country: Czech Republic
- Region: Liberec
- District: Liberec
- Municipality: Jablonec nad Nisou

Area
  - Total: 1.39 km^{2} (0.54 sq mi)

Population (2021)
  - Total: 272
  - Density: 196/km^{2} (507/sq mi)
- Postal code: 466 05

Lukášov (German: Luxdorf) is a village and administrative part of Jablonec nad Nisou in the Liberec Region of the Czech Republic.
