= Jelcz PR110E =

Trolleybus produced by the Polish companies Jelcz and Kapena

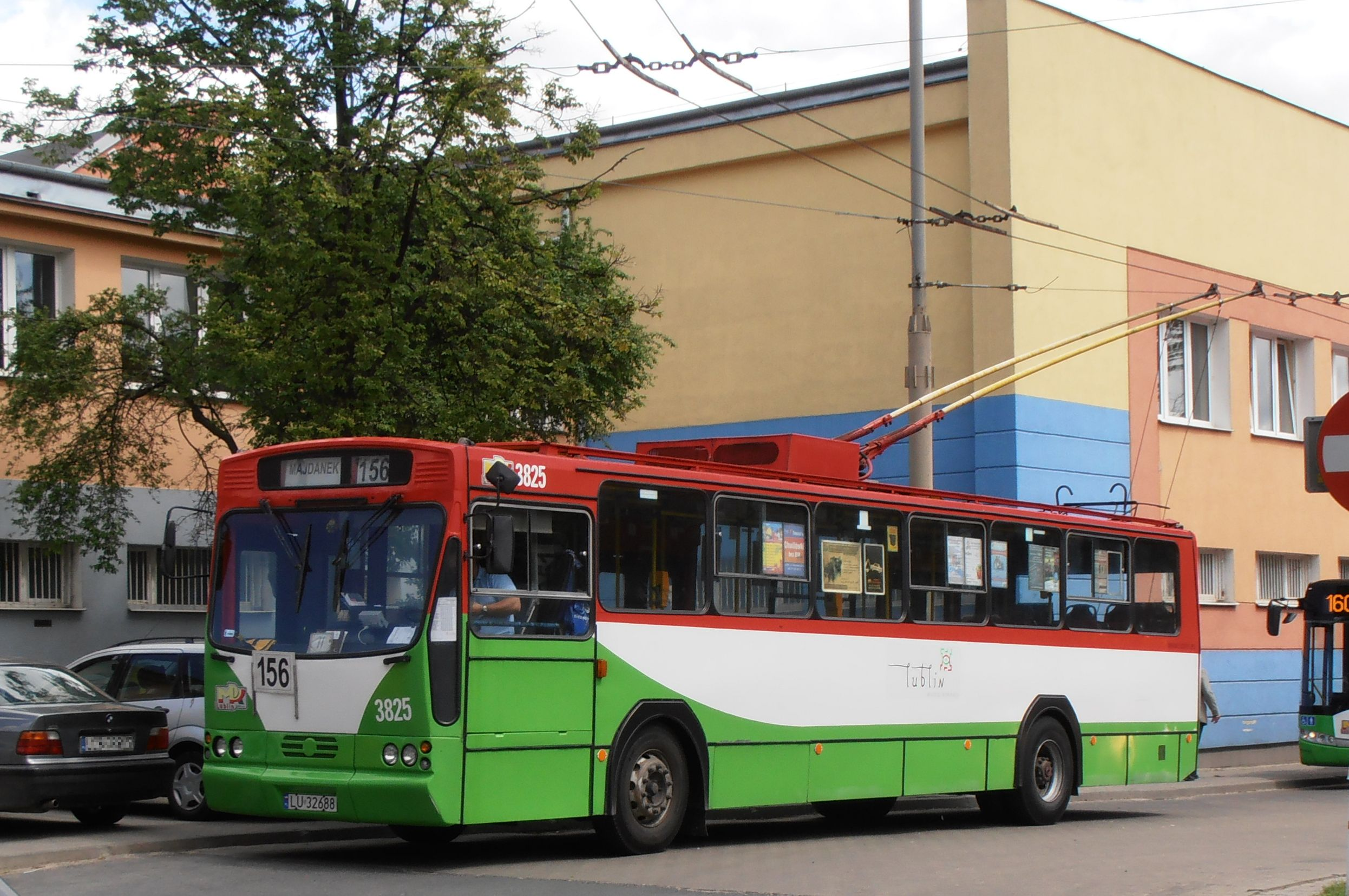
- Jelcz PR110E in Lublin

Overview
- Manufacturer: Jelcz; Kapena
- Also called: Jelcz PR110UE
- Production: 1980–1982 and 1986–1992
- Assembly: Jelcz-Laskowice; Słupsk

Body and chassis
- Body style: Medium-floor trolleybus, MAXI class
- Doors: 3

Powertrain
- Engine: Elmor DK210A3P

Dimensions
- Wheelbase: 6,100 mm (240 in)
- Length: 12,000 mm (470 in)
- Width: 2,500 mm (98 in)
- Height: 3,480 mm (137 in)
- Curb weight: 17,000 kg (37,000 lb)

Jelcz PR110E is a trolleybus that was produced by the Polish companies Jelcz from Jelcz-Laskowice and Kapena (at that time located in Słupsk) between 1980 and 1992. The design of this trolleybus was based on the Jelcz PR110 bus. A total of 153 units of this trolleybus model were built. The successor to this series was the Jelcz 120MT, which was based on the Jelcz 120M city bus. A variant of the Jelcz PR110E was the thyristor-controlled Jelcz PR110T.

== History ==
=== Origins ===
In the early 1970s, the authorities of the Polish People's Republic decided to modernize urban public transportation. To this end, from 1970 to 1972, several buses were tested on the streets of Warsaw, including the Hungarian Ikarus 242, West German Magirus-Deutz M170-S11H, French Berliet PR100, Italian FIAT 420A, British-Danish Leyland Lidrt 12/4 Worldmaster, Spanish Pegaso 5023, Japanese Hino RC620, and Czechoslovak Karosa SM11. The Berliet PR100 emerged as the winner. From the outset, this model was considered transitional, as there were plans to extend it by adding another pair of doors to meet greater transportation needs. The new Jelcz PR110 was a 12-meter bus equipped with 3 pairs of doors. These vehicles were partially constructed using components imported from France.

In the 1970s, city authorities across Poland began dismantling trolleybus networks. By 1975, only the networks in Gdynia (including Sopot) and Lublin remained. Despite this trend, Gdynia's trolleybus system was expanding. In 1976, work began on developing a Polish trolleybus, resulting in a prototype that combined the body and chassis of the Jelcz PR110U with the electrical system of the Czechoslovak Škoda 9Tr. This vehicle was tested in Gdynia for a year and a half, but it was not initially put into serial production. In 1977, another prototype was created in Warsaw, based on the Jelcz PR100. Trolleybus fleets for Polish networks were primarily purchased from Czechoslovakia (Škoda) and the Soviet Union (ZiU).

=== Serial conversion ===
The idea of converting the Jelcz PR110U bus into a trolleybus was revisited in 1979, initiated by the Gdańsk-Gdynia transport authority. The electrical equipment used in the conversion was adapted from the Škoda 9Tr trolleybus.

Serial conversion began in 1980. The first series produced 20 units of this trolleybus, which were then tested on the streets of Gdynia and Lublin. After testing, numerous improvements were made, but it was decided not to start full-scale serial production. The production of these trolleybuses coincided with organizational issues at PZL Mielec, which was responsible for manufacturing the combustion engines for Jelcz buses.

In the 1980s, new trolleybus networks were established in Tychy (1982), Warsaw (1983), and Słupsk (1985), increasing the demand for trolleybuses. Despite this growing demand, the company's management remained unconvinced about launching full-scale production, even though it was estimated that producing around 50 vehicles annually would be profitable.

However, Jelcz did not completely abandon the project. The company offered bus bodies without a drivetrain, which were prepared to accommodate electrical systems. This led to the production of a second series of Jelcz PR110E trolleybuses between 1986 and 1992, this time using electrical systems manufactured by the Gdańsk-based company Elmor, identical to the equipment used in Soviet trolleybuses also operated in Poland. The conversions were carried out by Kapena in Słupsk. In 1988, the design was modernized by adding a pulse-start system developed by the Warsaw Institute of Electronics.

In 1992, the Jelcz PR110E was replaced by the Jelcz 120MT, which was based on the Jelcz 120M bus. However, this vehicle was essentially a modernized version of the Jelcz PR110. The end of production coincided with the decline of trolleybus transportation.

== Construction ==
=== Bus systems ===
The body, chassis, and most mechanical components (except for the drivetrain) of the Jelcz PR110E were derived from the Jelcz PR110 bus. The only significant modification was the reinforcement of the roof at the location where the current collectors were mounted.

=== Modified systems ===
During the conversion from bus to trolleybus, the propulsion system was modified to be electrically powered. This involved replacing the original SW 680 diesel engine with an electric motor, which was installed behind the rear axle. Contactors that controlled the electric motor were mounted in the engine compartment. The current collectors, typical for trolleybuses, were installed on the central part of the roof to collect power from overhead wires. The electrical system used in this project was later used in subsequent conversions of buses to trolleybuses by Kapena and the Gdynia-based Trobus.

=== Modernizations during operation ===
The Jelcz PR110E trolleybuses were modernized during their operation. The most common upgrades involved refurbishing the bodies, similar to the updates made to the Jelcz PR110 and Jelcz M11 buses. On 7 April 2006, an induction motor, previously used in trams, was employed for the first time in Poland to power a trolleybus. This innovation was applied to a Lublin-based Jelcz PR110E trolleybus with fleet number 3830.

== Operation ==
Jelcz PR110E trolleybuses were delivered to all Polish cities with trolleybus networks at that time. From the 1990s to the mid-2000s, they formed the backbone of the trolleybus fleets in these cities. In 2011, Gdynia retired the last Jelcz PR110E from service on the Gdynia-Sopot network. In Lublin and Tychy, plans were made to phase out these trolleybuses during the second decade of the 21st century. Between 2012 and 2015, 15 of the Jelcz PR110E trolleybuses retired in Lublin were sent to Lutsk, Ukraine. Additionally, in 2014, Lublin's Jelcz PR110E trolleybuses began operating in Rivne, Ukraine.

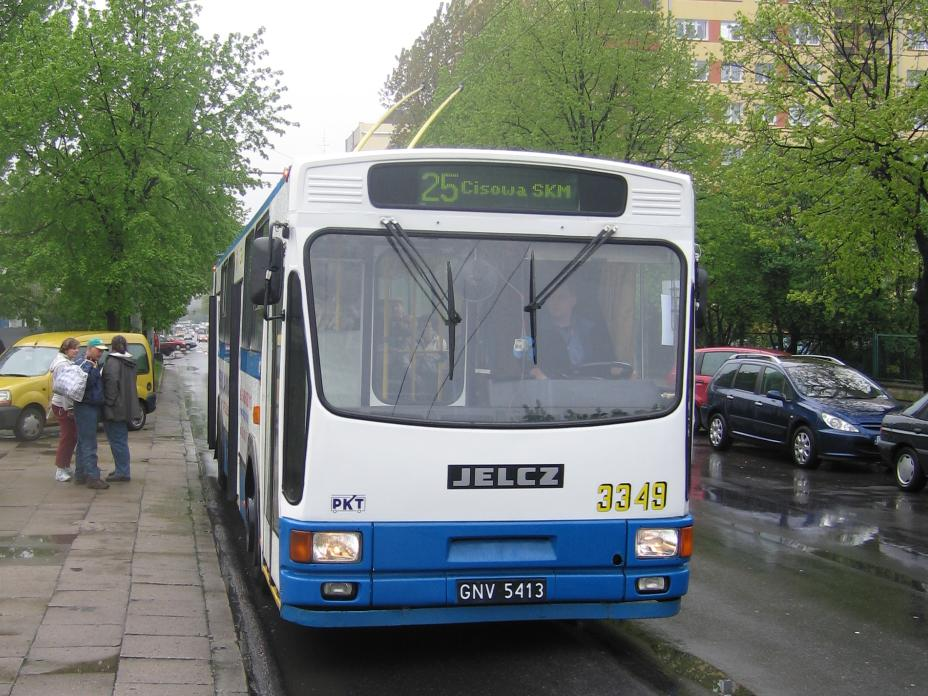
Modernized Jelcz PR110E in Gdynia colors

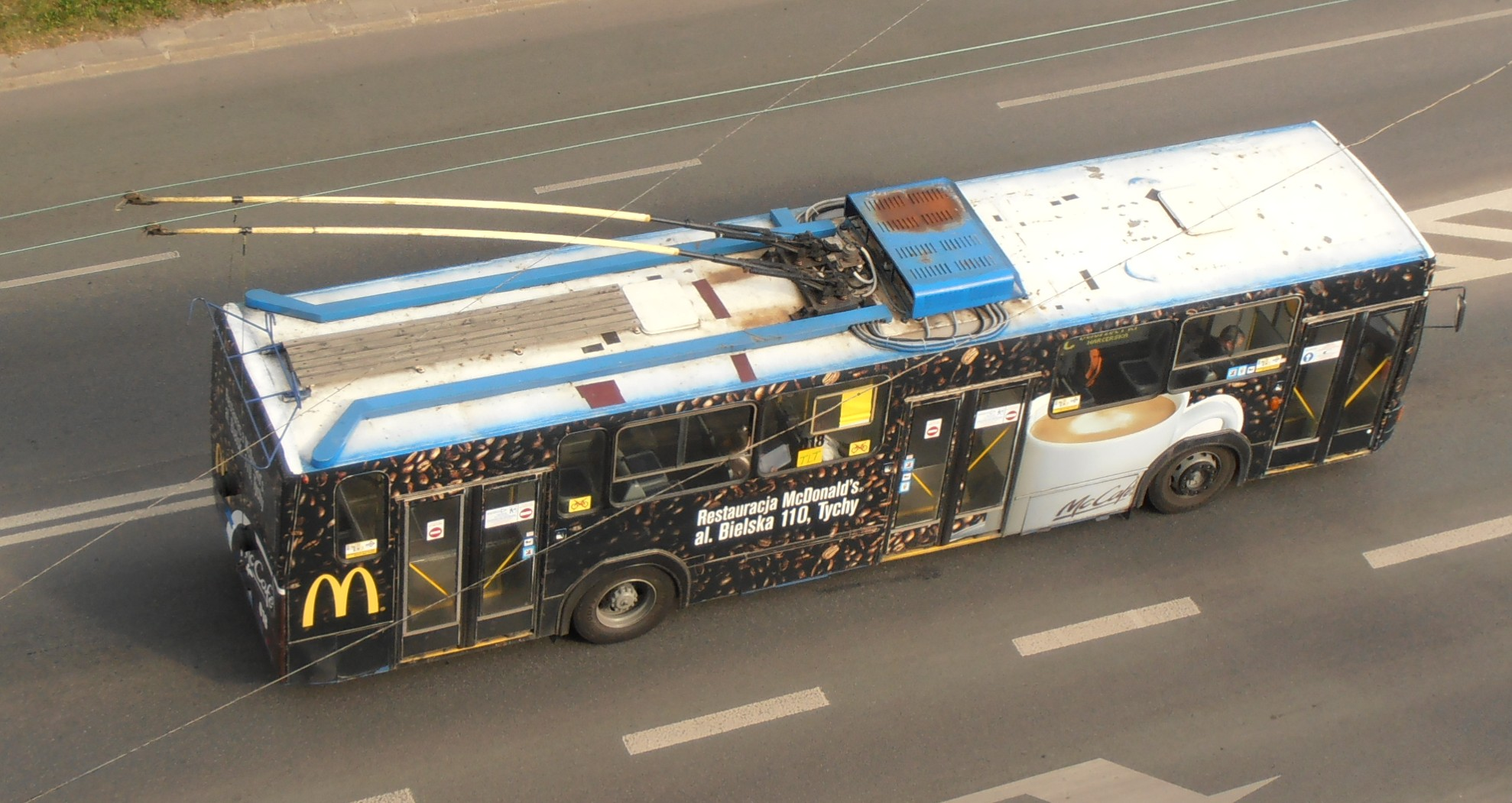
Jelcz PR110E in Tychy

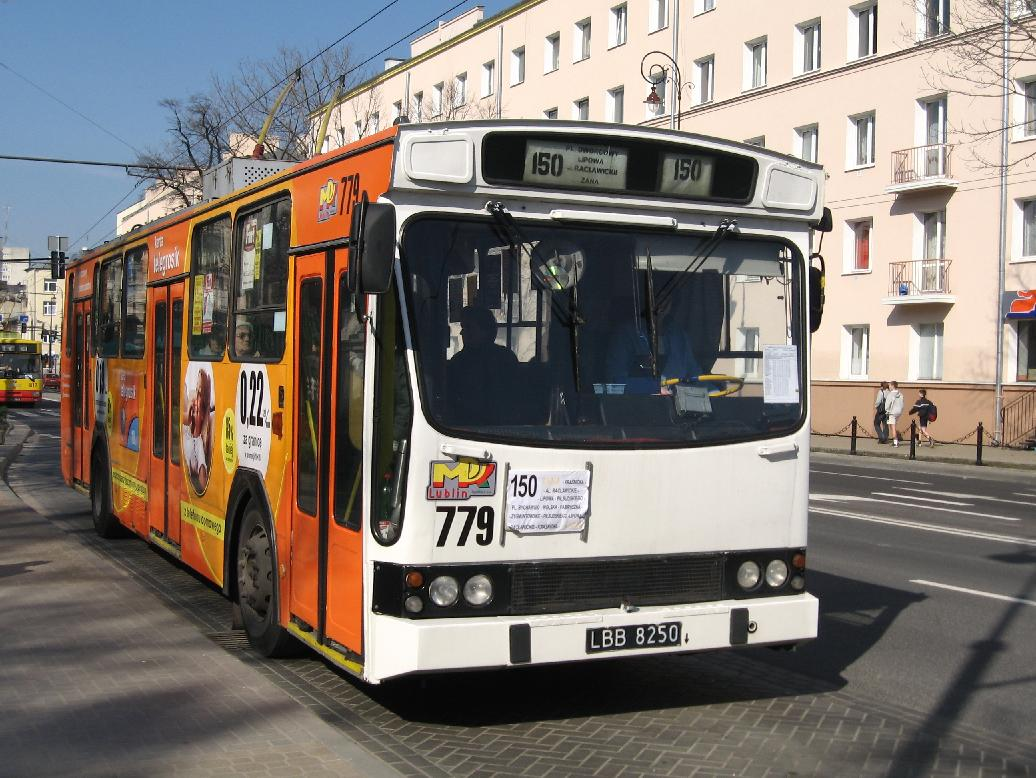
Jelcz PR110E owned by Lublin

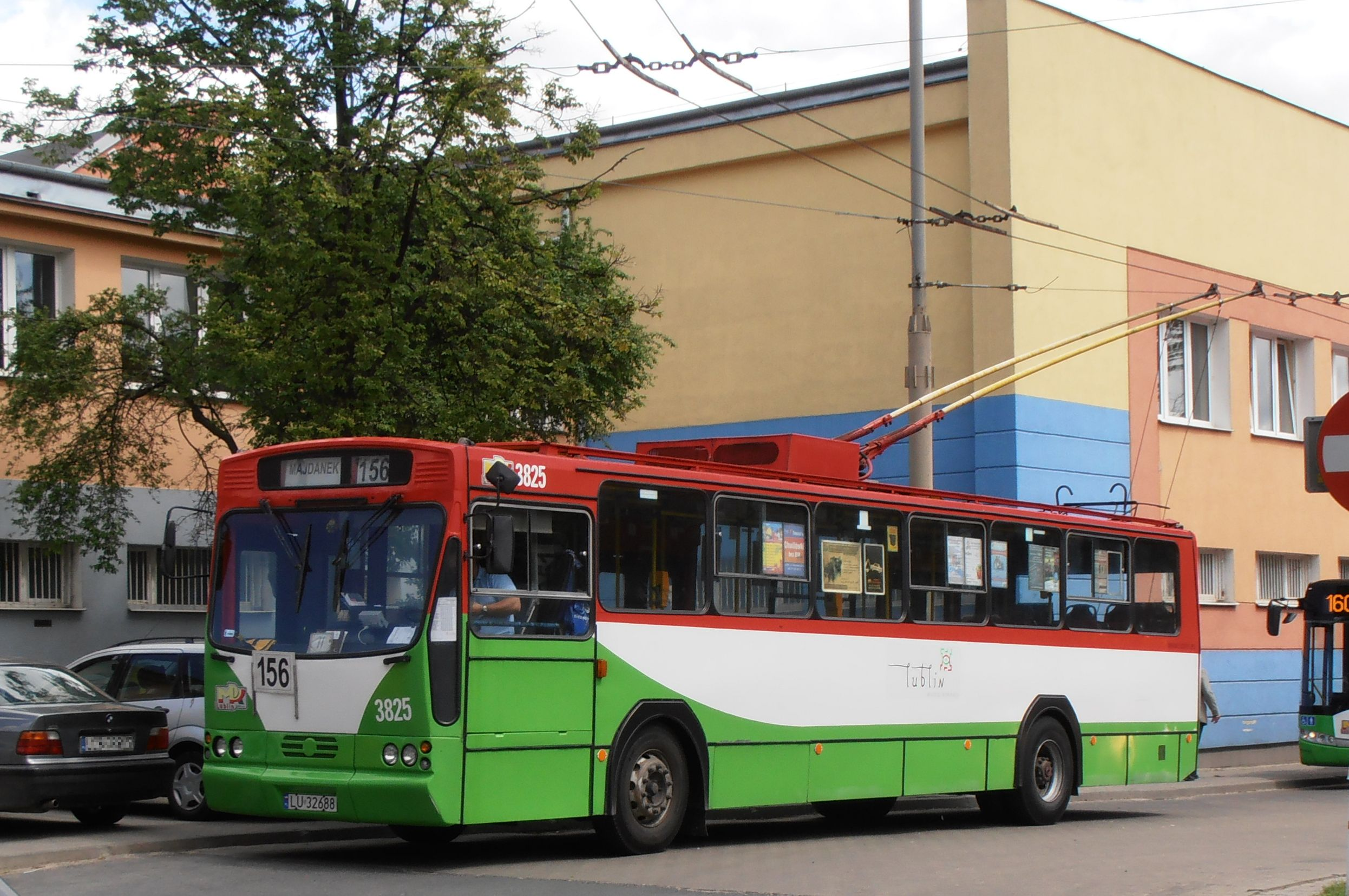
Modernized Jelcz PR110E in Lublin colors

== Bibliography ==
- Stiasny, Marcin (2008). Atlas autobusów (in Polish). Poznań: Poznański Klub Modelarzy Kolejowych. ISBN 978-83-920757-4-5.
- Połomski, Wojciech (2012). Pojazdy samochodowe i przyczepy Jelcz 1952-1970 (in Polish). Warsaw: Wydawnictwa Komunikacji i Łączności. ISBN 978-83-206-1741-2.
