= Mercedes-Benz O305 =

Single deck, double deck and articulated bus type

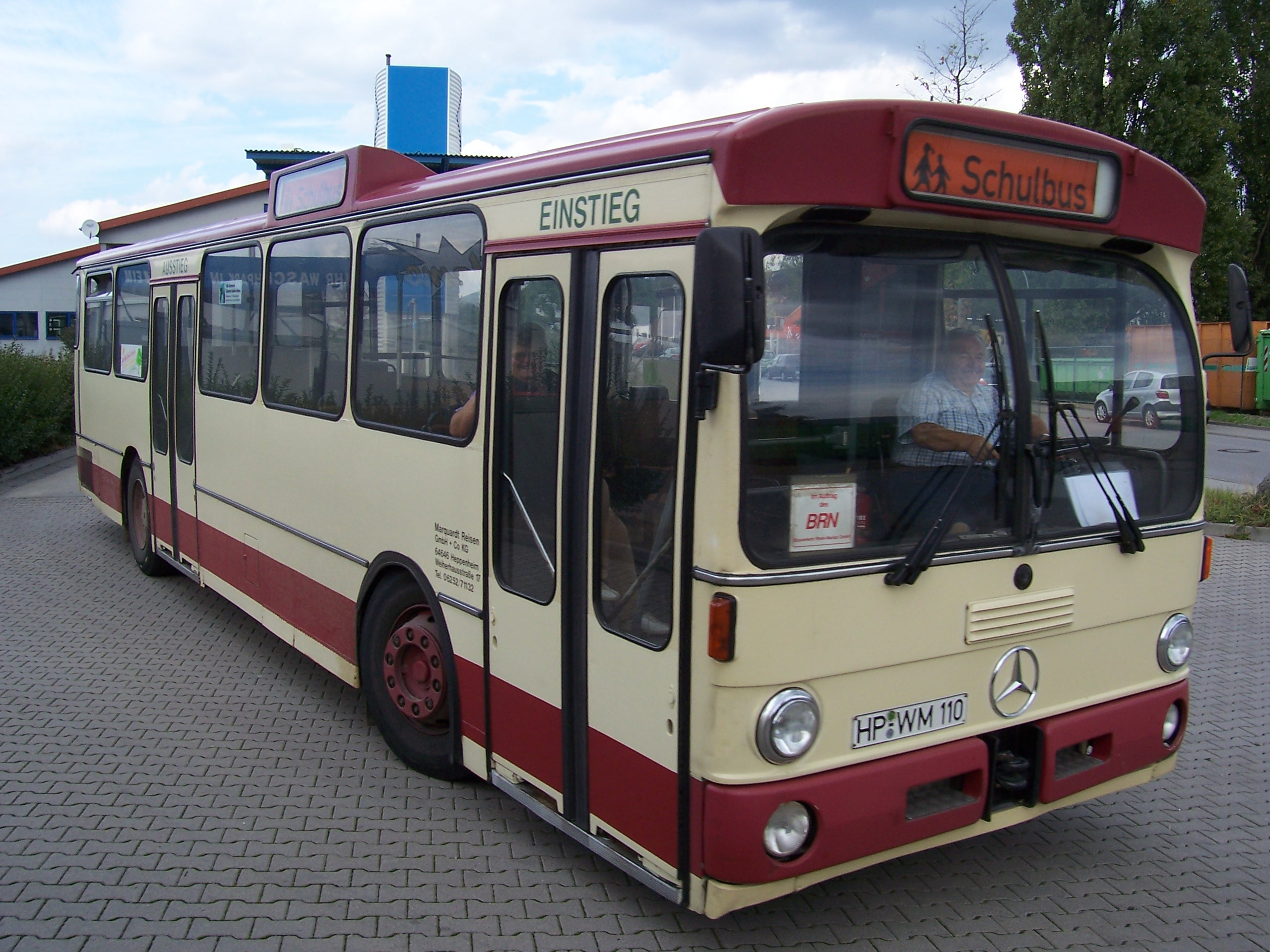

Overview
- Manufacturer: Daimler-Benz
- Production: 1969–1988
- Assembly: Mannheim, West Germany

Body and chassis
- Class: Complete bus Bus chassis
- Body style: Single-decker bus Articulated bus Double-decker bus
- Doors: 1 or 2 doors (rigid bus); 2 or 3 doors (articulated bus)
- Floor type: Step-entrance

Powertrain
- Engine: Mercedes-Benz OM 407.908 133 kw rear underfloor (diesel); Mercedes-Benz OM 407HG.295 147 kw rear underfloor (LPG); Mercedes-Benz OM 407.913 rear underfloor (CNG)
- Transmission: Mercedes-Benz 3-speed automatic

Dimensions
- Length: O305: 11.0 m / 11.3 m since 1974: 11.1 m O305G: 17.1 m
- Width: 2.5 m
- Height: 3.0 m or 4.0 m

Chronology
- Successor: Mercedes-Benz O405

The Mercedes-Benz O305 is a single deck, double deck or articulated bus manufactured by Mercedes-Benz in Mannheim, West Germany from 1969 until 1988. It was built as either a complete bus or a bus chassis and was the Mercedes-Benz adaptation of the unified German VöV-Standard-Bus design, that was produced by some different bus manufacturers including Büssing, Magirus-Deutz, MAN, Ikarus, Gräf/Steyr, Heuliez, Renault, and Pegaso. The O305 was originally designed for use as a single-decker bus, however it was later redesigned to accommodate double-decker bodies.

== Germany ==
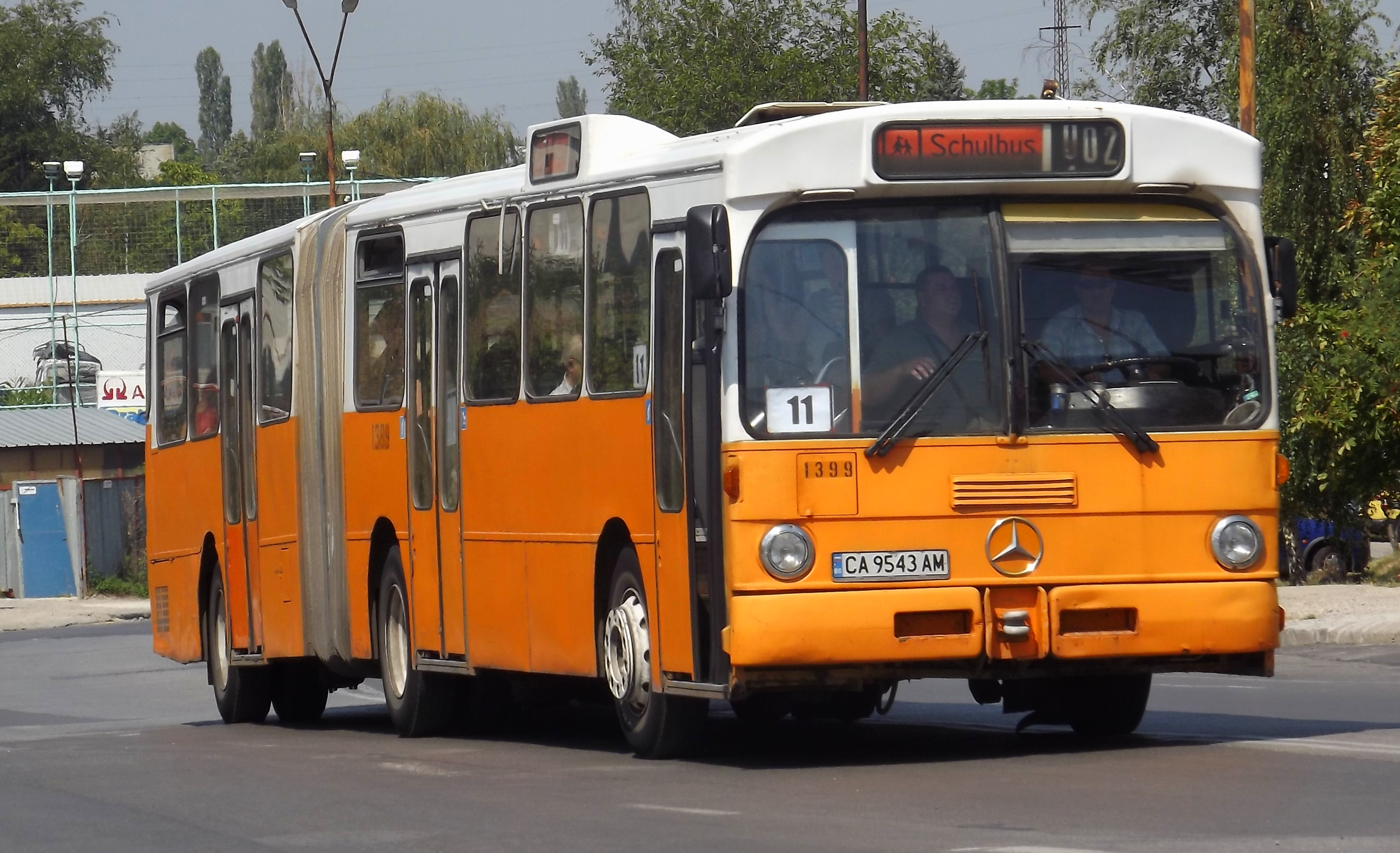
O305G, articulated version of O305

Mercedes-Benz unveiled the O305 prototype in 1967, production in Mannheim started in 1969. A slightly elongated Standard-Überlandbus suburban model (11.3m) followed in 1970, replaced by the O307 class in 1972. From 1974 the O305 received a more powerful engine and an epicyclic gear rear axle plainly audible by its distinctive singing noise.

An articulated version was named the O305G. In the mid-1970s, the Falkenried rolling stock manufacturer in Hamburg had developed a transmission concept with the engine and the power train placed in the rear part. After Daimler-Benz had acquired the patent, a 1977 prototype was deployed by the Hamburger Hochbahn public transport operator. Production began in 1978.

After a first converted trolleybus version named the O305T was deployed in Kaiserslautern, Daimler-Benz built five articulated buses with a BBC-Sécheron electrical equipment (O305GT) which served the public transport in Kaiserslautern and the Bergen trolleybus system, from 1985 in Basel, and finally in Brașov, Romania. Four dual-mode bus types were built in 1983 and deployed in Esslingen and Essen. Twenty hybrid electric variants were used by the Stuttgarter Straßenbahnen public transport company and in Wesel. In 1979, the CMTC in Brazil imported one O305T for test until 1980.

From 1984 onwards, the O305 was replaced by the second generation of the German Standard-Linienbus Mercedes-Benz O405. Production of the O305 ceased in early 1987.

== Hong Kong ==
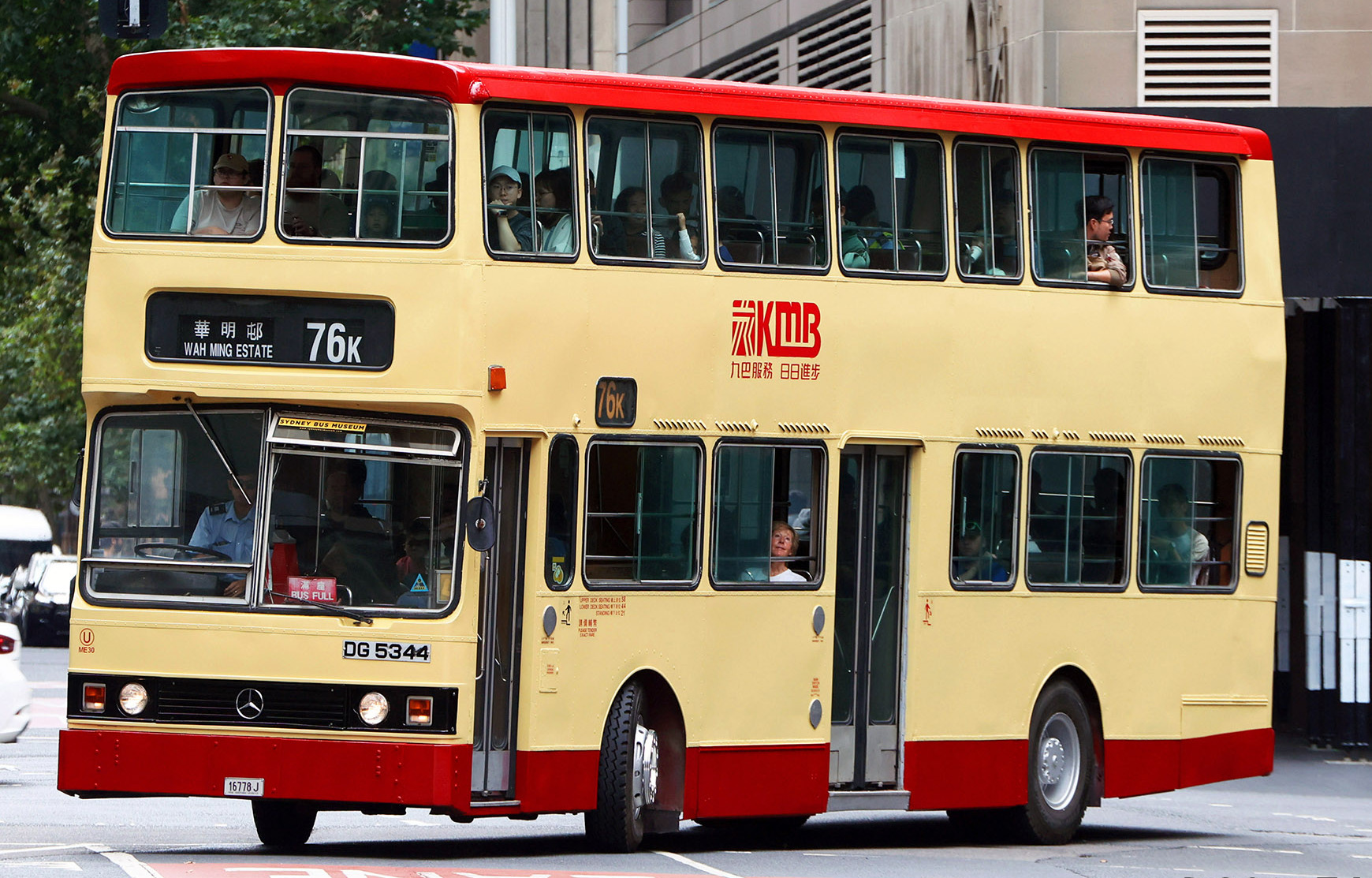
1985 Kowloon Motor Bus Alexander RH bodied O305 preserved

In Hong Kong, the O305 was the first bus model from outside United Kingdom and countries of Commonwealth of Nations to be purchased. A total of 41 buses were introduced, with the prototype in 1983 and the others in 1985. All were withdrawn and subsequently scrapped in 2001/02 except three, which are preserved by groups of bus enthusiasts in Hong Kong and Australia.

=== Background and history ===
For a long period of time, Hong Kong franchised bus operators were required by law to purchase buses produced in Commonwealth countries. After repealing the requirement in 1983, Mercedes-Benz supplied a two-axle 11-metre double-decker to Kowloon Motor Bus (KMB).

The O305 demonstrator was registered on 4 August 1983. Following successful trials, KMB ordered another 40 in 1985, with modified frontal design and ventilation system. All the 41 buses were fitted with Alexander RH bodies.

KMB later adopted a policy of acquiring 3-axle double-decker buses of similar length. Because Mercedes-Benz did not offer a 3-axle version of the O305, no more Mercedes-Benz buses were purchased by KMB.

=== In service ===
Initially, the first bus ran on route 105, which was new, running between Lai Chi Kok and Sheung Wan. However, Cross-Harbour Tunnel's environment was unsuitable for this model, as well as the fact that the towing of these buses by the tow trucks used by the tunnel authority could result in damage to the chassis, so entire fleet were reallocated to express routes running between Yuen Long and Tsuen Wan/Kowloon. The O305s were renowned for their speed and power, with a maximum speed of over 120 km/h reported.

The buses provided services on the trunk routes in Yuen Long until the mid-1990s. With newer buses (especially those with air conditioning) available for trunk services, the Mercedes were redistributed to North District and Tai Po and served there until their retirement on 22 November 2002.

These buses had a unique livery designed by KMB, but all of them had the livery returned to the standard livery of KMB non-air-conditioned buses shortly before their re-distribution.

== Singapore ==
In 1982, Singapore Bus Services (SBS) acquired a single Willowbrook-bodied Mercedes-Benz O305 double-deck bus in June for trial purposes. A year later, SBS also took in a second Mercedes-Benz O305 double-deck demonstrator with a prototype Alexander R-type body make that was previously exhibited at the 1982 Commercial Motor Show in the UK. These buses were retired in the mid-1990s.

Satisfied with the trial, SBS purchased 200 Mercedes-Benz O305 double-deck buses with Alexander R-type bodywork in 1984. They featured an 11,412 cc OM 407h engine with its modular W3D 080 R 3-speed gearbox. At 11.1 m and a licensed capacity of 109 passengers, they were the largest non-airconditioned double-decker buses in Singapore. They entered service from 1984 to 1987 and were deployed to Ang Mo Kio, Toa Payoh and Hougang bus depots throughout their lifespan. Withdrawals began in 1996 and the last buses were retired by 2001.

== Australia ==
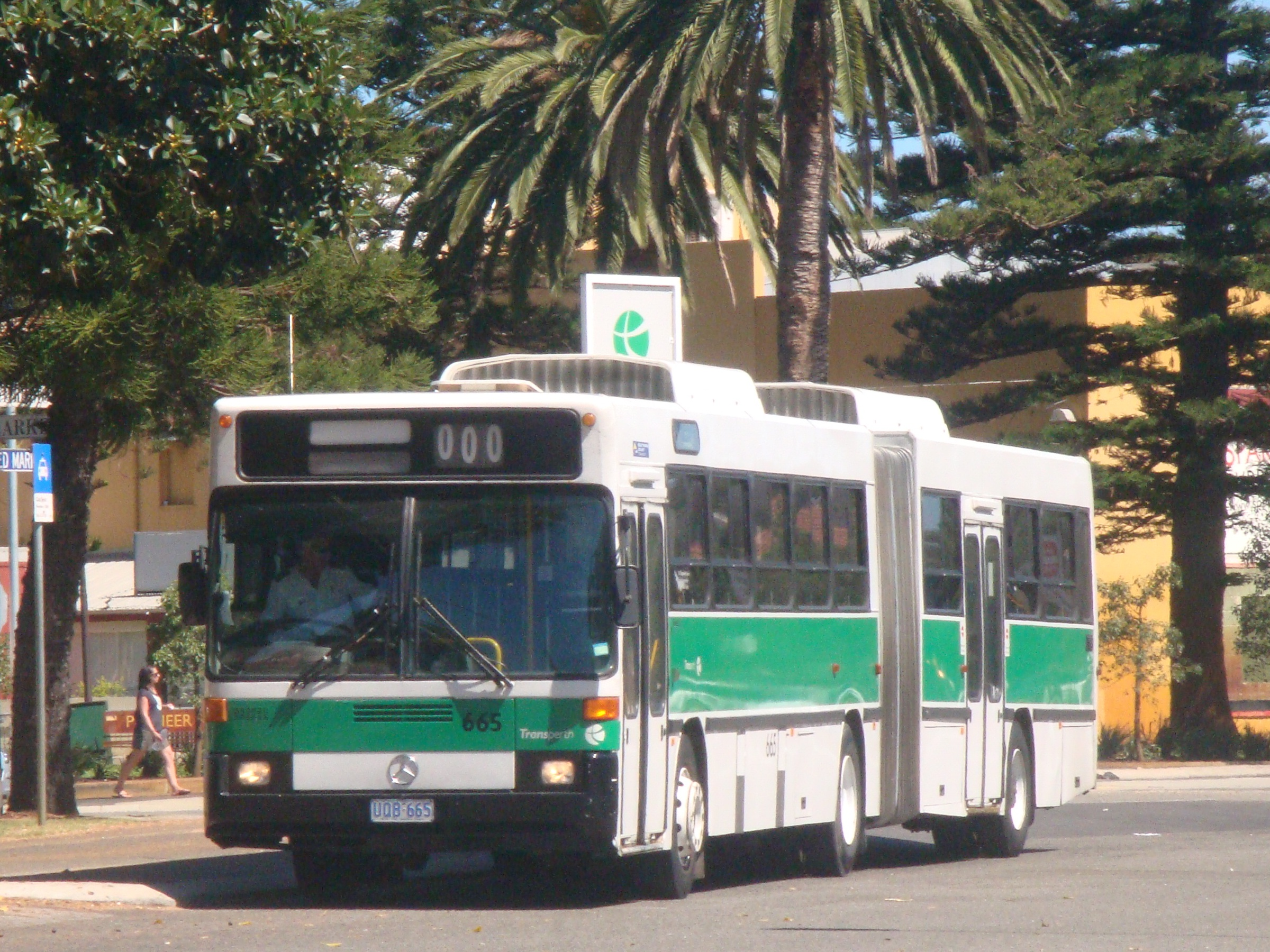
Perth's Metropolitan Transport Trust was the first bus company to operate the articulated Mercedes-Benz O305G

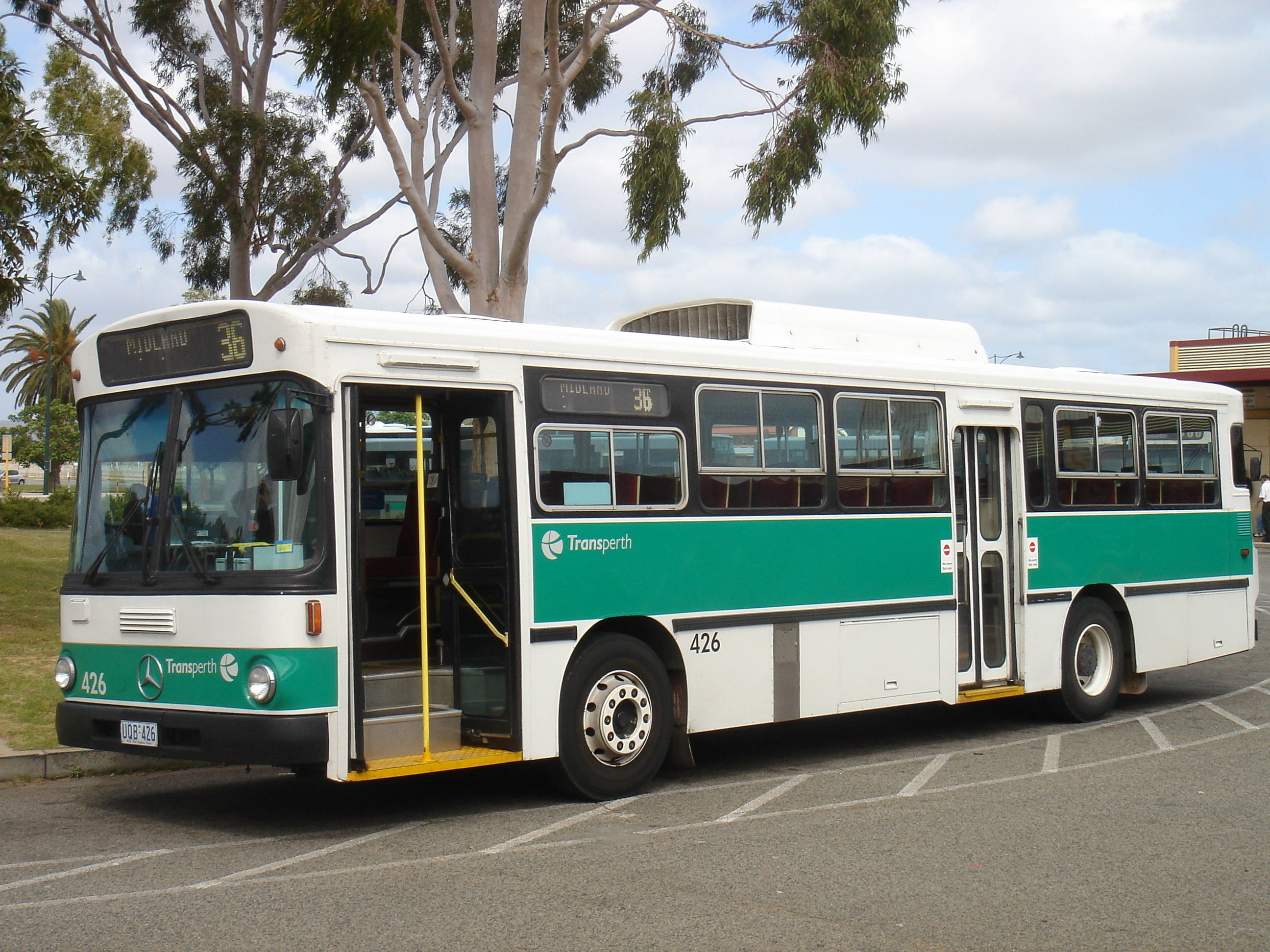
JW Bolton bodied O305

=== Perth ===
Perth was the first Australian city to operate the Mercedes-Benz O305. The first units entered service with the Metropolitan Transport Trust (MTT) in 1975. Over a period of eleven years between 1975 and 1986, over 400 O305s were purchased. Transperth (as the MTT was rebranded in 1986) and its contractors began withdrawing this sizable fleet of O305s in October 1999 although it would be 2012 until the last were withdrawn.

The bodies were built by Freighter Industries, JW Bolton, Hillquip and Howard Porter. There were some unusual O305s operating in Perth. Examples include 444, which featured a Mauri (Italy) body assembled locally by JW Bolton and 007, an experimental bus (model OG305) with an LPG-fuelled engine. In 1984, 008 Australia's first CNG-fuelled bus entered service. From the success of the trial gas buses, two O305s (270/1) were converted to LPG operation in the early 1980s, a CNG-fuelled O305G was ordered and entered service in 1987 as 009. In the early 1990s 26 O305s were converted to CNG.

Perth was also the first Australian city to operate the articulated Mercedes-Benz O305G. Three batches were purchased with 18 in 1979, three in 1980, and 19 in 1986/87. The first and second batches had bodywork completed by JW Bolton and Howard Porter and featured model OM 407h 240 hp (177 kW) naturally aspirated engines. To overcome sluggishness, the buses in the third batch (also featuring Howard Porter bodies but built to the VöV-II design) were fitted with model OM 407hA 280 hp (206 kW) turbocharged engines.

=== Sydney ===
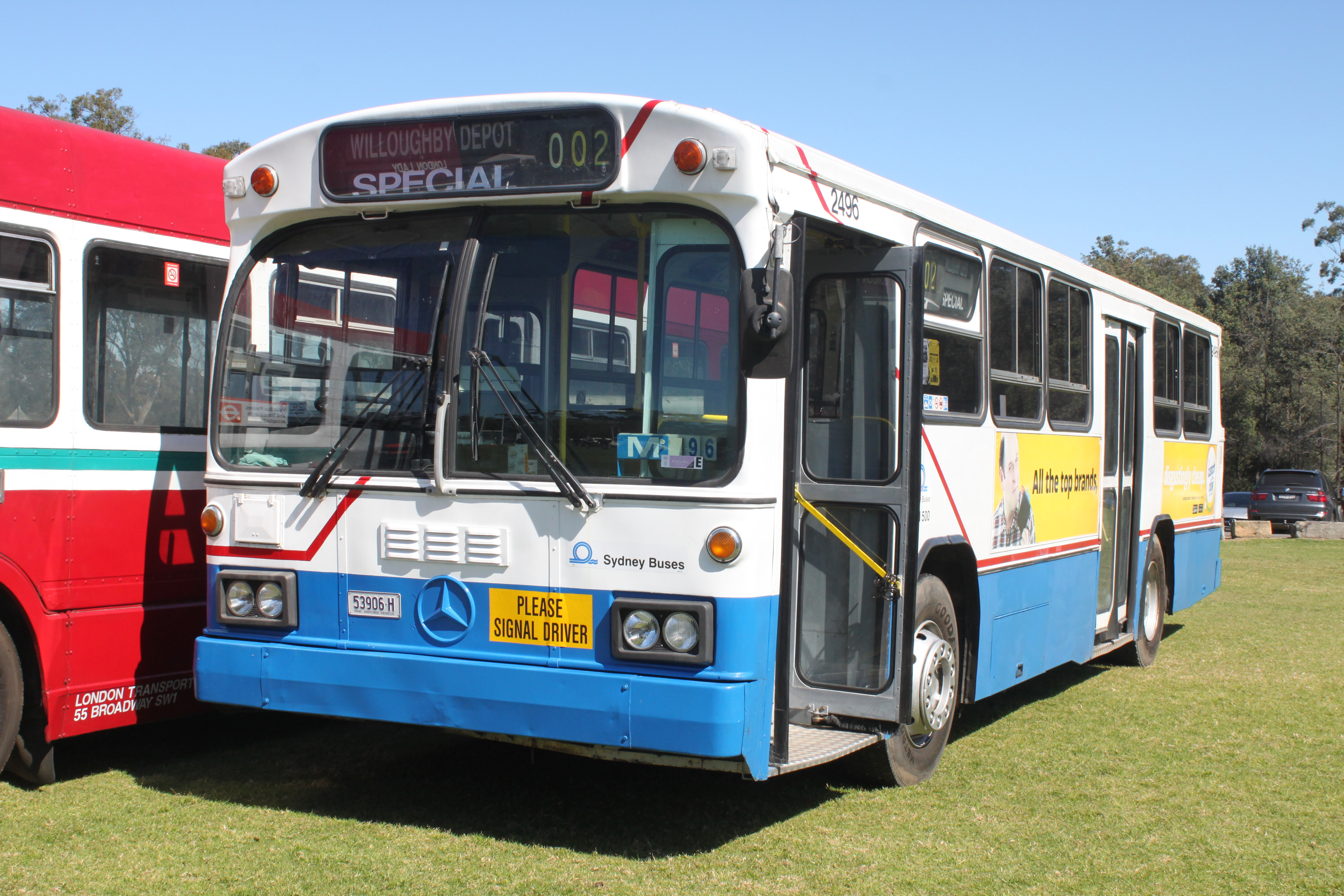
Sydney Buses Pressed Metal Corporation bodied O305 in August 2015

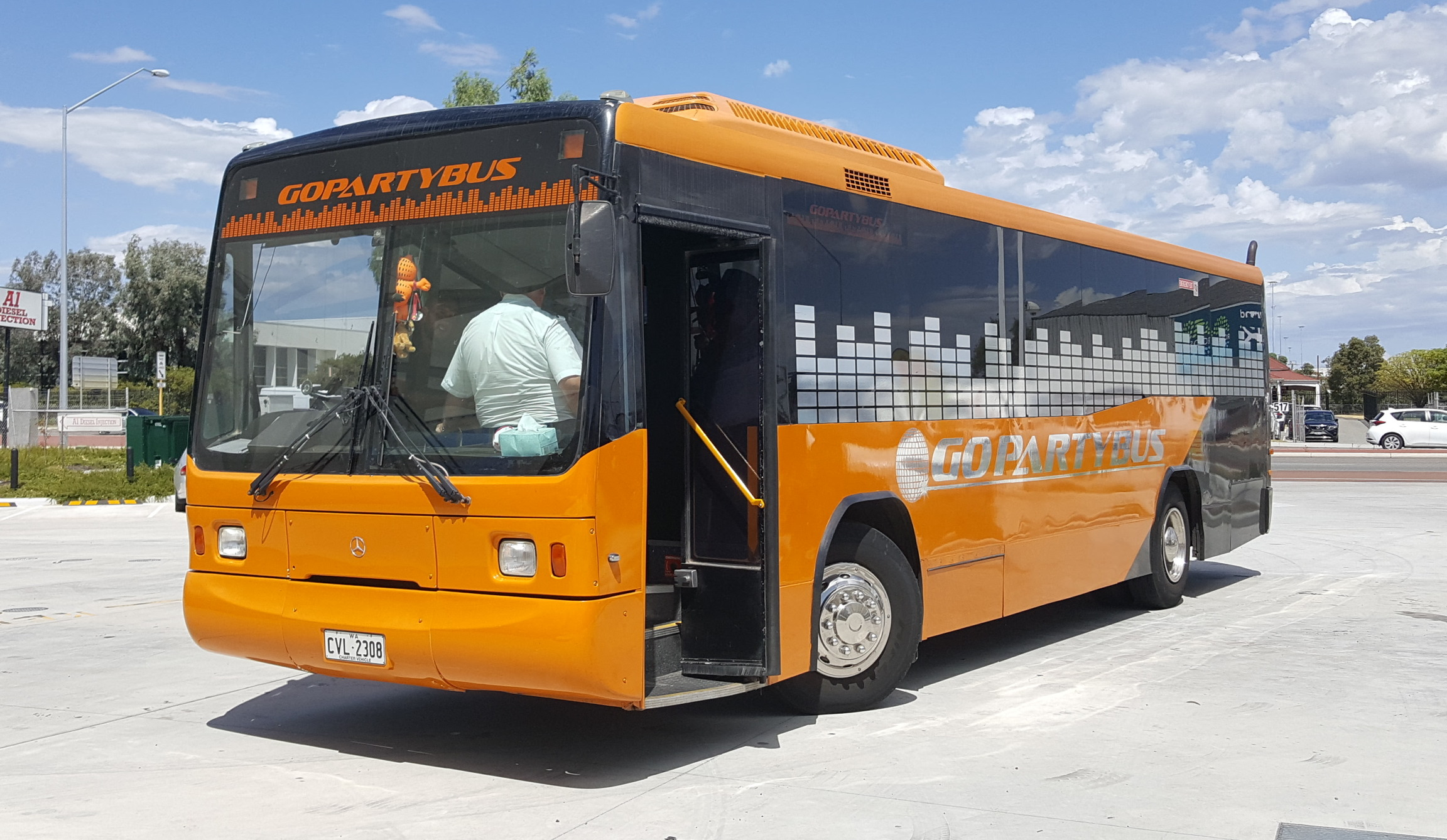
Former Sydney Buses Ansair Orana bodied O305

The Public Transport Commission and its successors operated the largest fleet of O305s, purchasing 1,287 O305s and 30 articulated O305Gs, all bodied by Pressed Metal Corporation for use in Sydney and Newcastle.

Originally 200 Mercedes-Benz O305s with Galvastress Mark 1 bodywork were delivered between May 1977 and August 1978 with one built with a prototype Mark 2 body. These were followed by an order for 550 Galvastress Mark 2 bodied O305s that remains the largest bus order in Australia. These were delivered between October 1978 and November 1980. Whilst the bodies on the Mark 1s had been an effectively the existing PMC body married with a VöV front, the Mark 2s were of the VöV design with a lower roofline and two-leaf doors.

A further order saw 182 O305s bodied by with the Galvastress Mark 3 body enter service between August 1981 and October 1983 with one built with a prototype Mark 4 body. The revisions to the body were minor, and the most noticeable were a return to four-piece sliding windows to improve ventilation and to 203 mm high route numbers at both the front and rear after the 127mm examples proved unpopular. The Mark 3 body was also used on 30 O305G articulated buses. A trial unit was delivered in September 1981 followed by the production units between September 1983 and May 1984.

A fleet of 355 Mark 4 O305s were delivered between July 1984 and August 1987. The chassis on these was slightly revised, being fitted with ABS.

Withdrawals commenced in 1989 with the final examples withdrawn in October 2012. At the time of withdrawal, some of these buses had accumulated more than 1 million kilometres of service.

=== Canberra ===
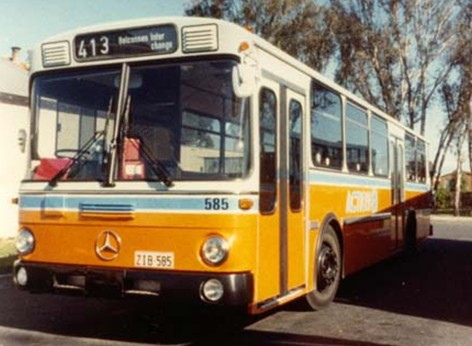
ACTION Ansair O305

ACTION took delivery of a fleet of 85 Ansair bodied Mercedes-Benz O305s between November 1981 and March 1985. They were built with standard Mercedes-Benz "StULB" fronts. After being refurbished in the early 1990s, the first were sold in 1995 and then at several other intervals until 1999. All were sold to private bus companies mainly in the Sydney and Melbourne metropolitan areas with 12 being exported to New Zealand to operate in Auckland and Wellington.

Ansair also bodied five Mercedes-Benz O305G articulated buses between February and April 1983. These were sold in 1997/98 to private bus companies around Australia.

=== Adelaide ===
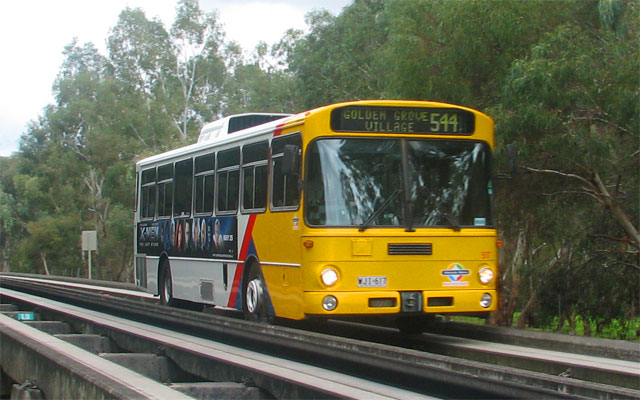
Torrens Transit O305 on the O-Bahn Busway in Adelaide

The State Transport Authority purchased 41 O305 and 51 O305G articulated buses for service on the O-Bahn Busway. The chassis were heavily modified at the Mitsubishi Motors plant in Tonsley. The rigid buses had their power increased to 240 hp (177 kW) and the articulateds to 280 hp (207 kW); they were the first buses to travel at a speed of 100 km/h on suburban routes.

== New Zealand ==
=== Auckland ===
Auckland Regional Authority and its successors had a fleet of over 300 Mercedes-Benz O305 buses which remained in use until 2005. Many of these were sold to other bus operators or converted for other uses including mobile homes. All were fitted with New Zealand Motor Bodies bodies, VoV bodies built under license.

After serving the city of Auckland, some were rebuilt with low-floor bodies by DesignLine and Fairfax Industries, for further suburban use.

=== New Plymouth ===
New Plymouth City Transport purchased seven Mercedes-Benz O305 buses over two orders:

- 4 purchased in 1976 (on the back of the Auckland Regional Authority order)
- 3 purchased in 1984

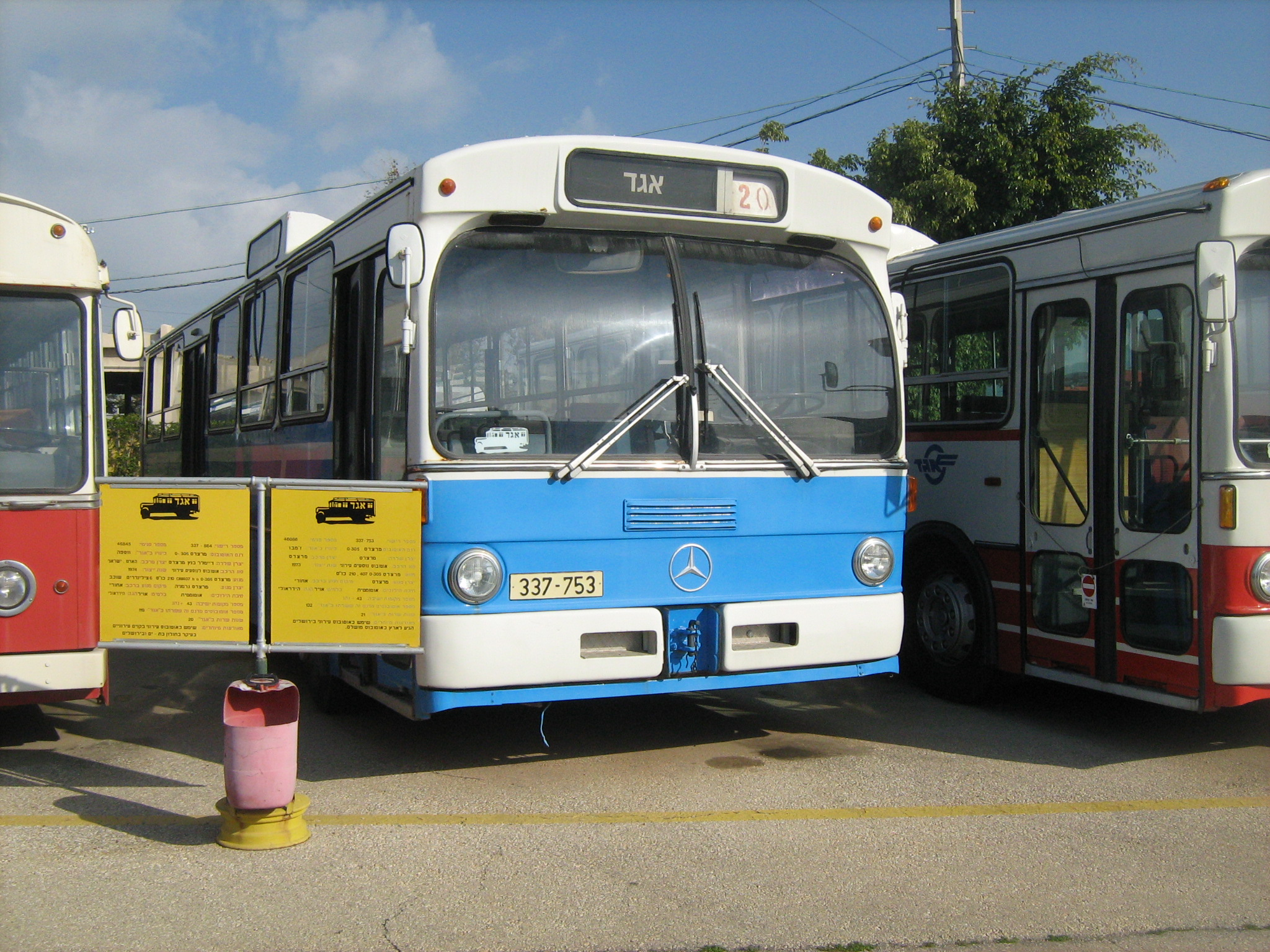
Egged O305

== Israel ==
Egged in Israel purchased large numbers of O305s, some with locally made bodies including by Ha'argaz and Mervakim and others with bodies by Mercedes-Benz.

== United Kingdom ==
=== SELNEC ===
The South East Lancashire North East Cheshire Passenger Transport Executive purchased two O305s in 1973 and had them fitted with Northern Counties bodies with 43 seats and dual doors. They were evaluated against Leyland National and Metro-Scanias.

=== Luton Airport ===
Luton Airport purchased three O305G articulated buses in 1988 with Lex Services bodies based on Heuliez framing delivered in April 1988, they were fitted with only 35 seats allowing for large amounts of standing and luggage space. As they were used within the airport and not on public roads, they were left hand drive. They were the first rear-engined 'pusher' artics to enter service in the United Kingdom.
