= JW Bolton =

Former bus body builder in Perth, Western Australia

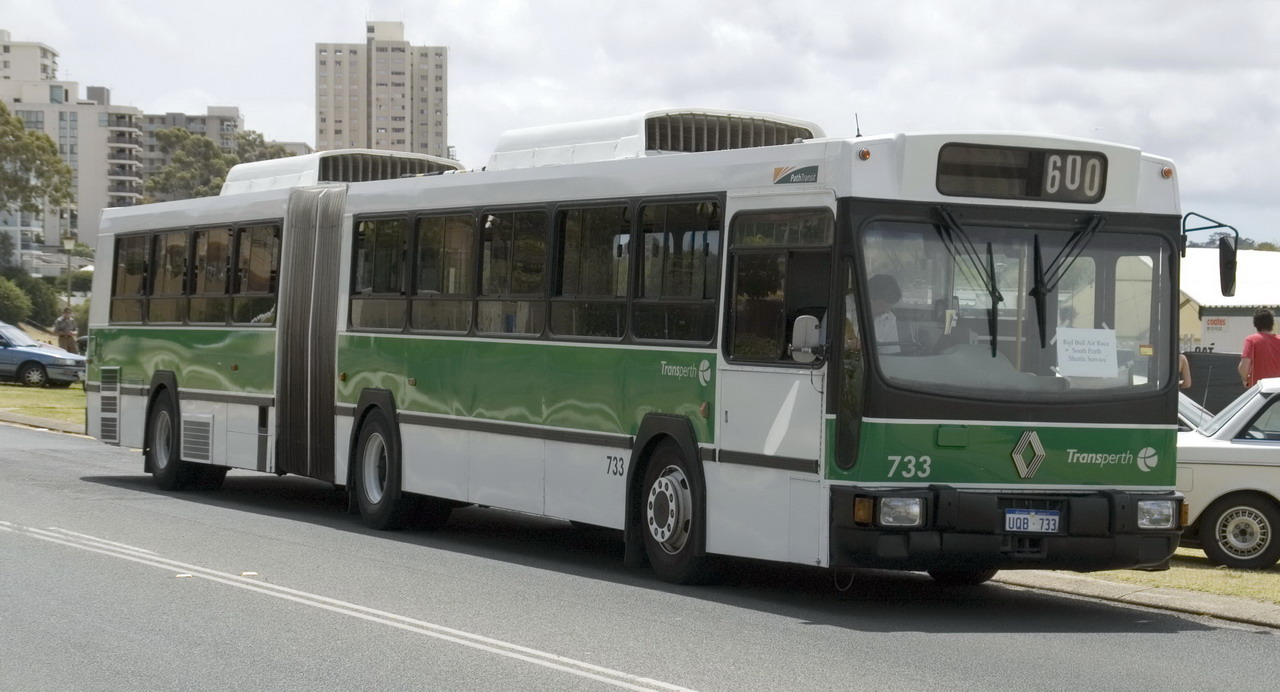
- Transperth Renault PR180.2 in Perth
- Industry: Bus manufacturing
- Founded: 1972
- Founder: John Bolton
- Defunct: 1989
- Headquarters: Kewdale

JW Bolton was an Australian bus bodybuilder in Perth.

== History ==
In 1972, John Bolton, the son of Boltons owner Keith, formed JW Bolton. It initially manufactured fire engines, before moving into bus bodying completing bodies on Leyland B21, MAN SG292H, Mercedes-Benz O305 and O305G, and Renault 100.2 and 180.2 chassis for Transperth.

In 1983, a batch of Mercedes-Benz O303 coaches were bodied by Ansair for Westrail with JW Bolton completing the fitout.
