= Heuliez Bus =

French Bus manufacturer

- Type: Subsidiary
- Industry: Manufacturing
- Founded: 1979; 47 years ago
- Headquarters: La Crenuère, Rorthais, France
- Key people: Giandomenico Demartini (President & CEO), Remy Foyer (Managing Director)
- Products: Buses
- Revenue: €118m (2008)
- Number of employees: 450
- Parent: Iveco
- Website: heuliezbus.com

Heuliez Bus is a French bus manufacturer, founded in 1979. Formerly part of French company Heuliez, it is currently a subsidiary of Italian holding company Iveco, which itself is majority owned by Tata Motors.

== History ==
Heuliez Bus has developed many types of public transport vehicles and gained the recognition of Mercedes-Benz O305 (rigid) and O305G (articulated) with other front and rear, badged as Heuliez. Around 600 of each type operated in France between 1975 and 1995.

In 1982 the company started to build the GX 17, a minibus based on the Renault Master. After that, in the 1980s, collaborated with Renault Bus to develop the GX 107 and GX 187 and built the GX 44, for the public transport authority of Nantes, which is based on an O305; and the GX 113, specifically for the city of Marseille.

In the 1980s, Heuliez Bus and Renault developed the "Mégabus" (officially the Heuliez GX237) which was a bi-articulated high-floor bus based on the Renault PR180.2. Ten of these buses were built in 1989 for Bordeaux which was used until the tram system opened in 2004.

In 1991, Renault and Volvo each acquired a 37.5% shareholding in Heuliez Bus.

In 1990 Heuliez Bus made the GX 77H midibus (The H standing for Heuliez), and in 1994, the low-floor bus GX 317, built on a Renault chassis. From 1995 to 2001, its collaboration with Volvo led to the design and production of the GX 217 and GX 417.

The GX 117 midibus, the successor to the 77H, was launched in 1999. As of 2012, with significant restyling, this is sold as the GX 327. GX 127 and GX 127L are at the planning stage.

The newest product, designed for Clermont-Ferrand, is the GX 427. Although its CNG version was turned down, it is the twin, articulated version of the Irisbus Citelis 18.

In France, buses produced by the company have the marques "Heuliez Bus"; elsewhere they are known as "Irisbus". The company manufactured 13,439 buses between 1985 and 2006.

Amongst other things, since 2002 Heuliez Bus has manufactured the Irisbus Civis and Irisbus Cristalis on behalf of the Bus business unit of Iveco Bus.

In 2008 the company had revenue of €118.1m, employing around 450 employees at its factory in Rorthais.

Although the brand survived the creation of the Irisbus and reintroduction of the Iveco Bus brands, it's now only available on francophone markets. The GX 337 and GX 447 models are branded as Iveco E-Way by Heuliez on other markets.

Since 2022, the company has exclusively manufactured its GX ELEC electric city bus, at its factory in Rorthais, Deux-Sèvres. The bus is also manufactured alongside other vehicles at the Iveco factory in Annonay, Ardèche.

== Gallery ==
Heuliez GX ELEC

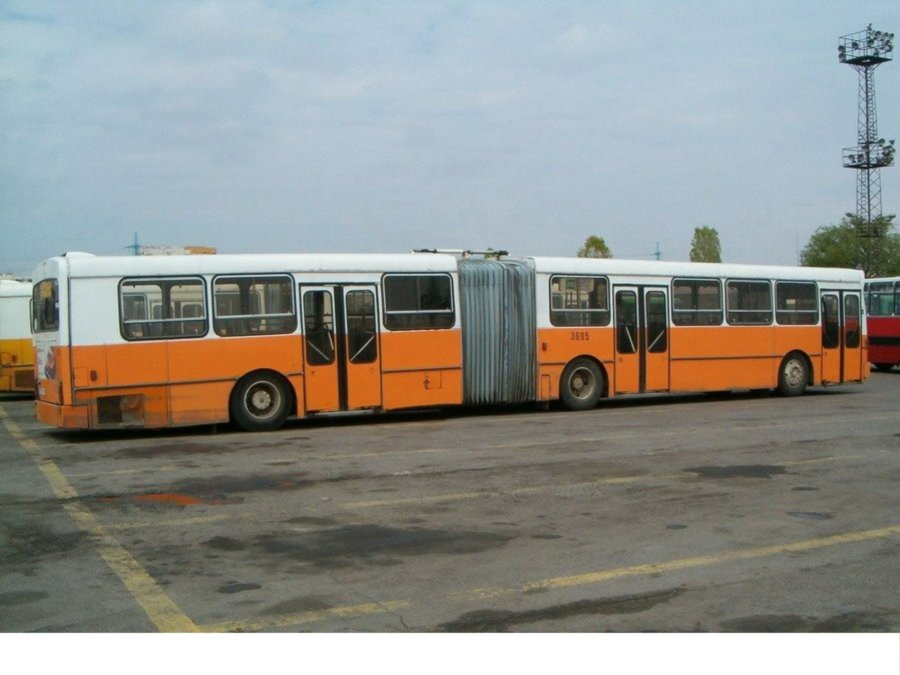
Heuliez O305G

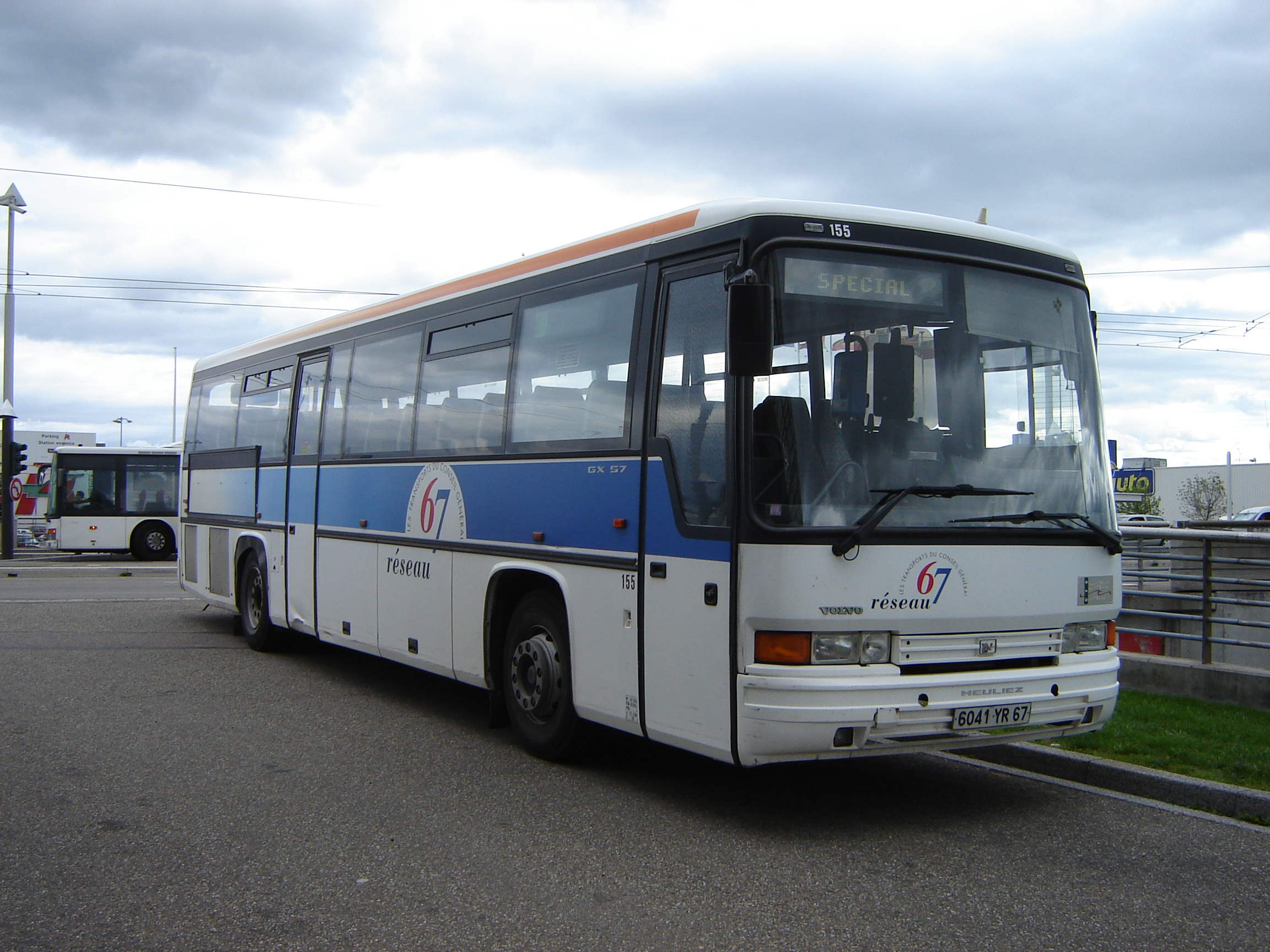
Heuliez GX 57

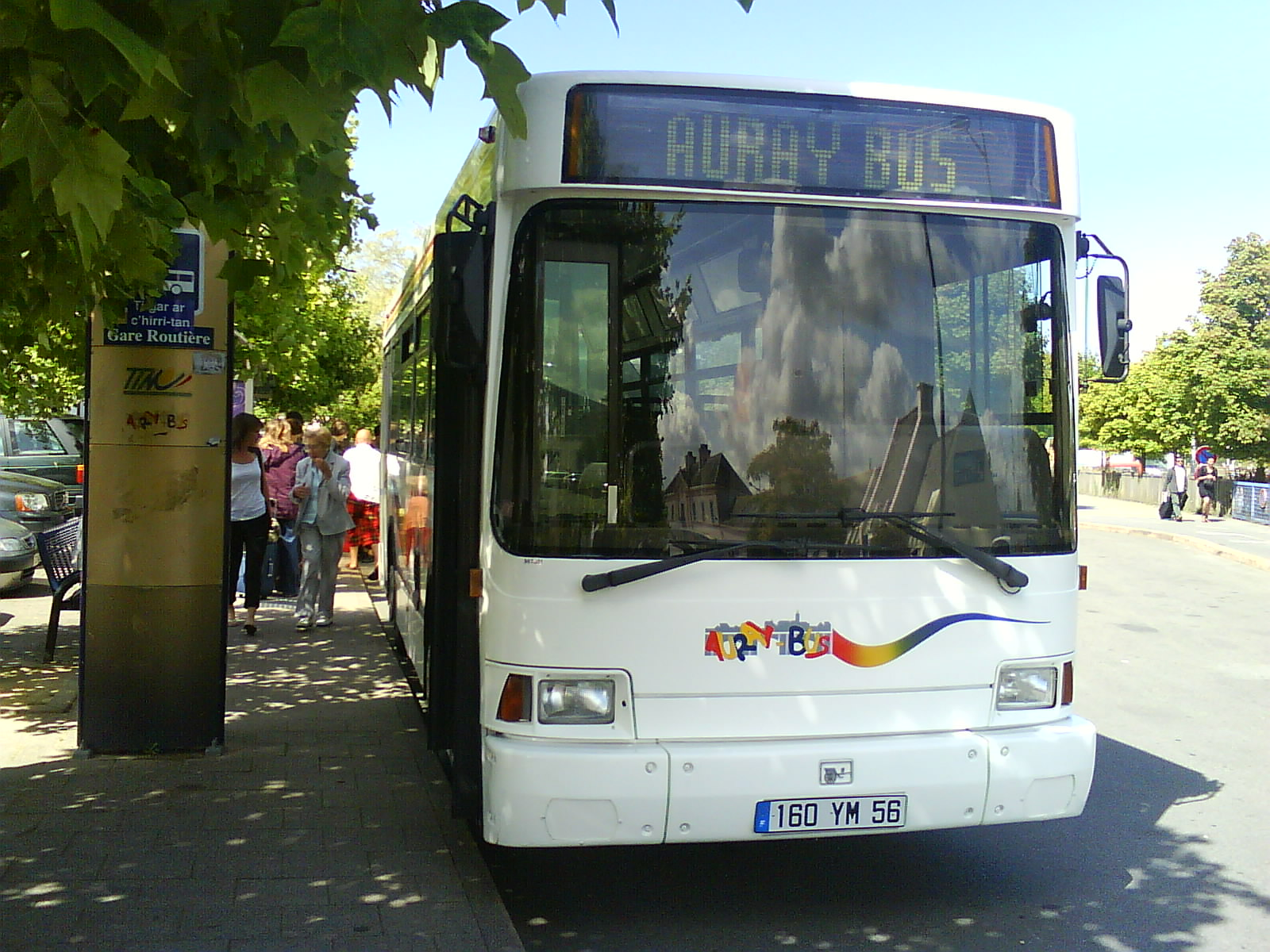
Heuliez GX 77H

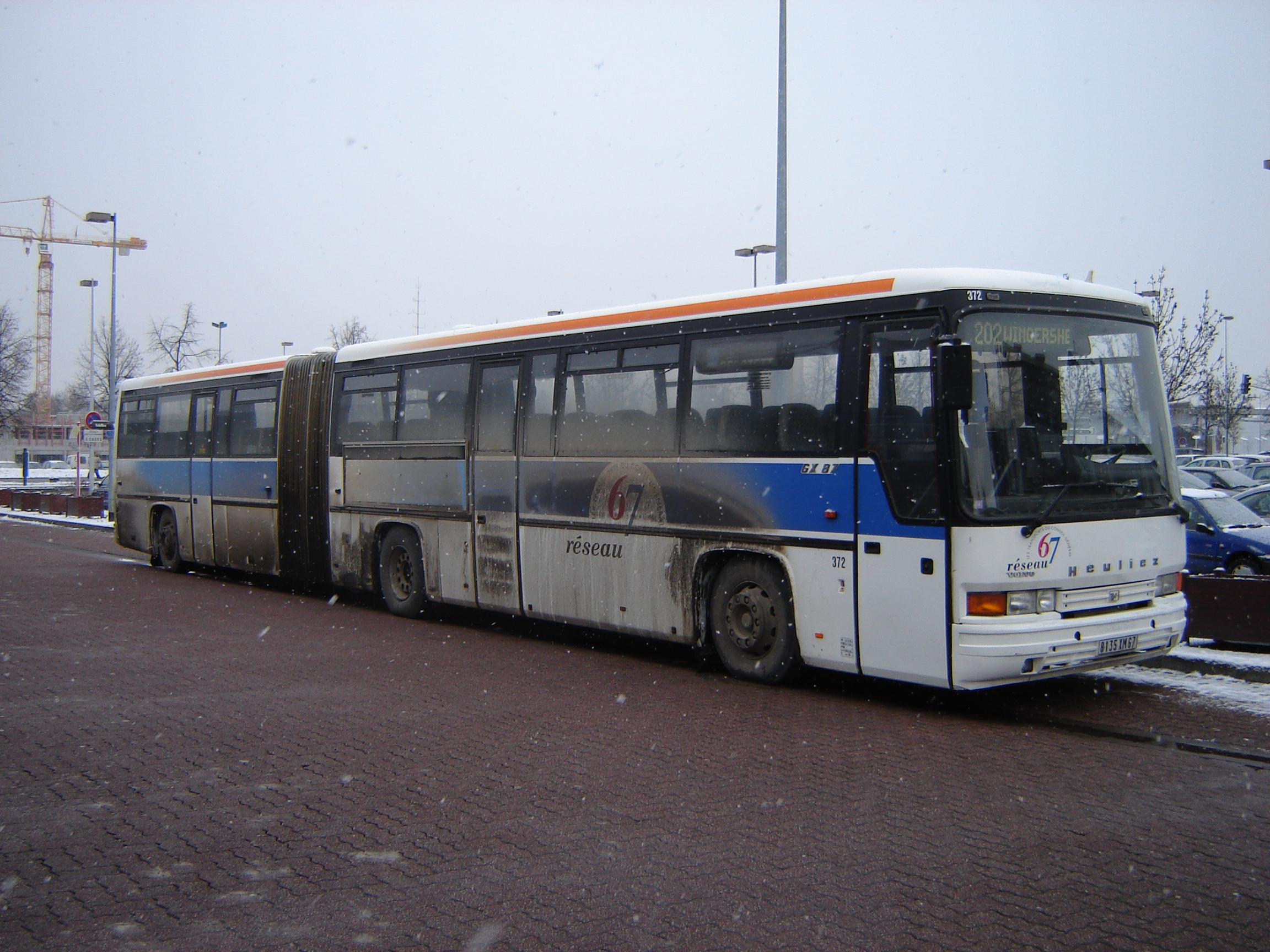
Heuliez GX 87

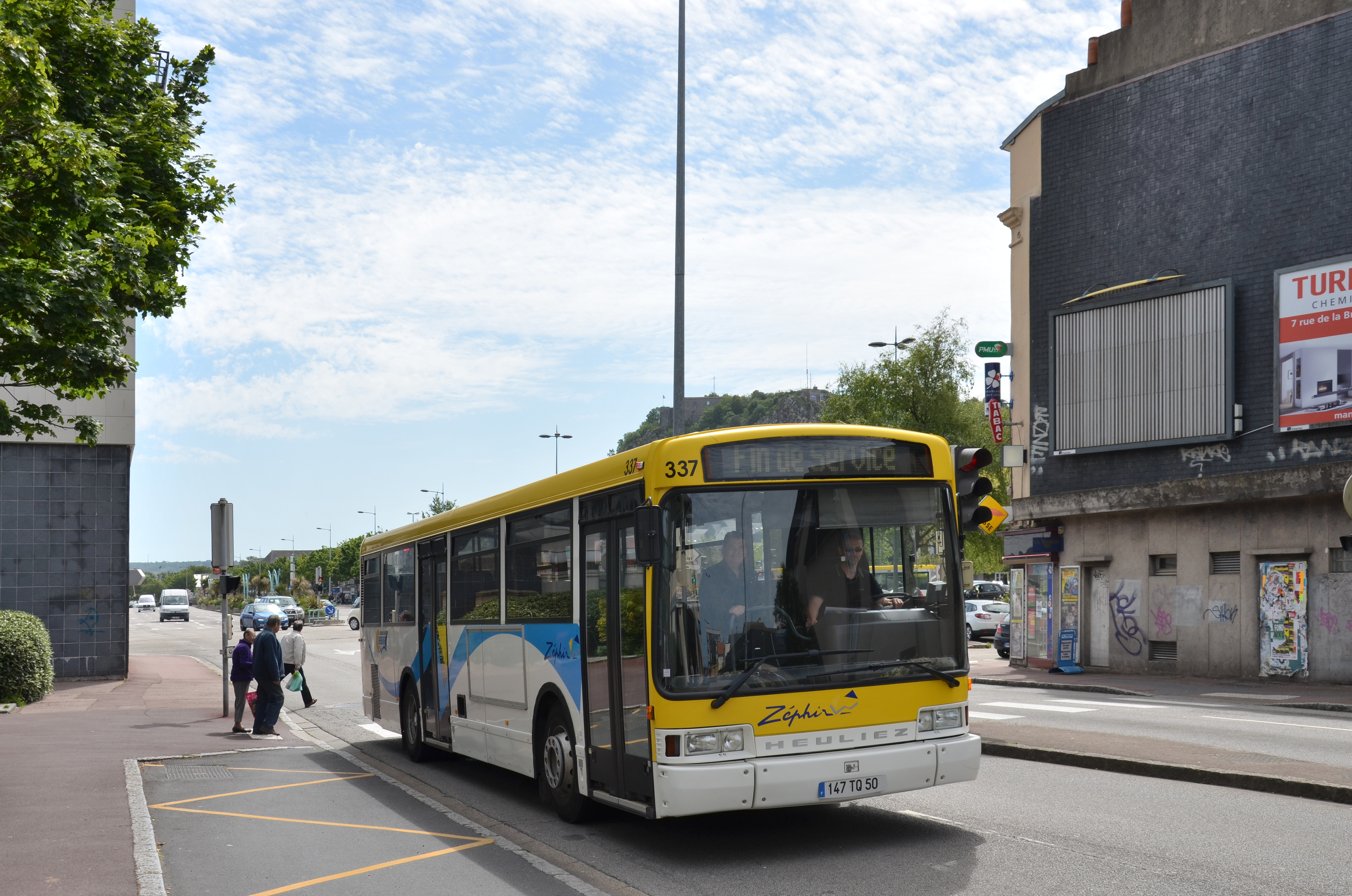
Heuliez GX 107

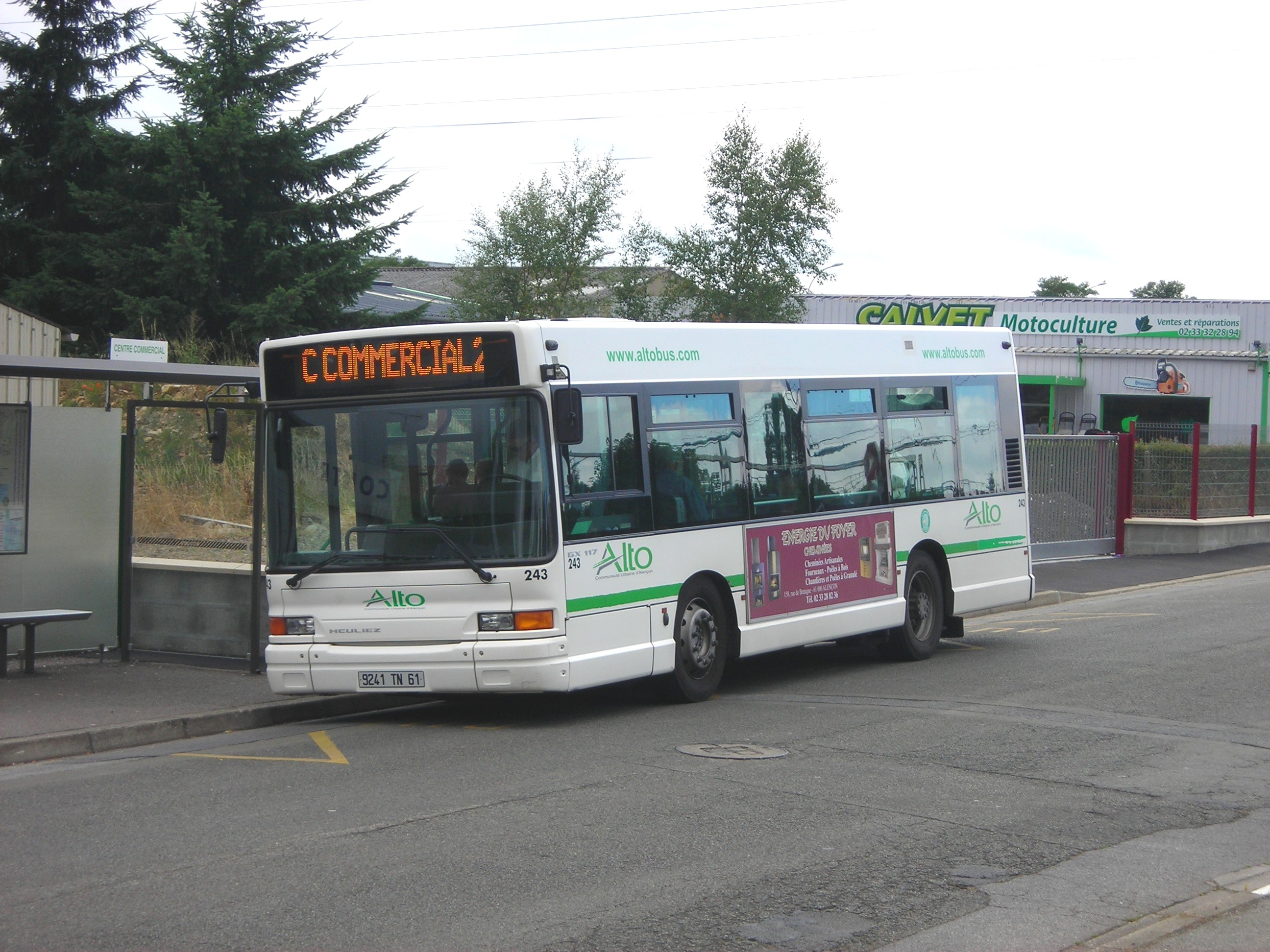
Heuliez GX 117

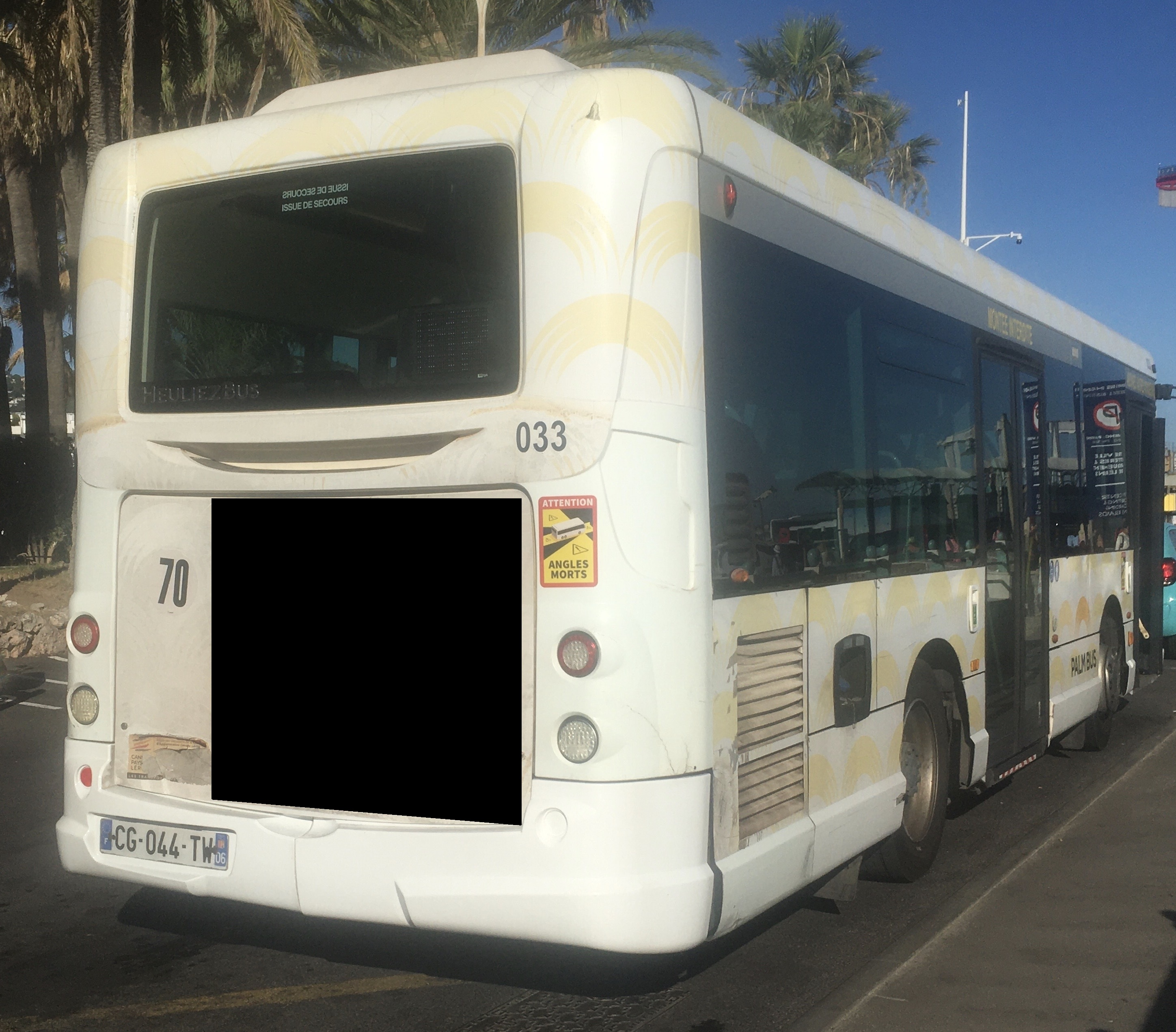
Heuliez GX 127

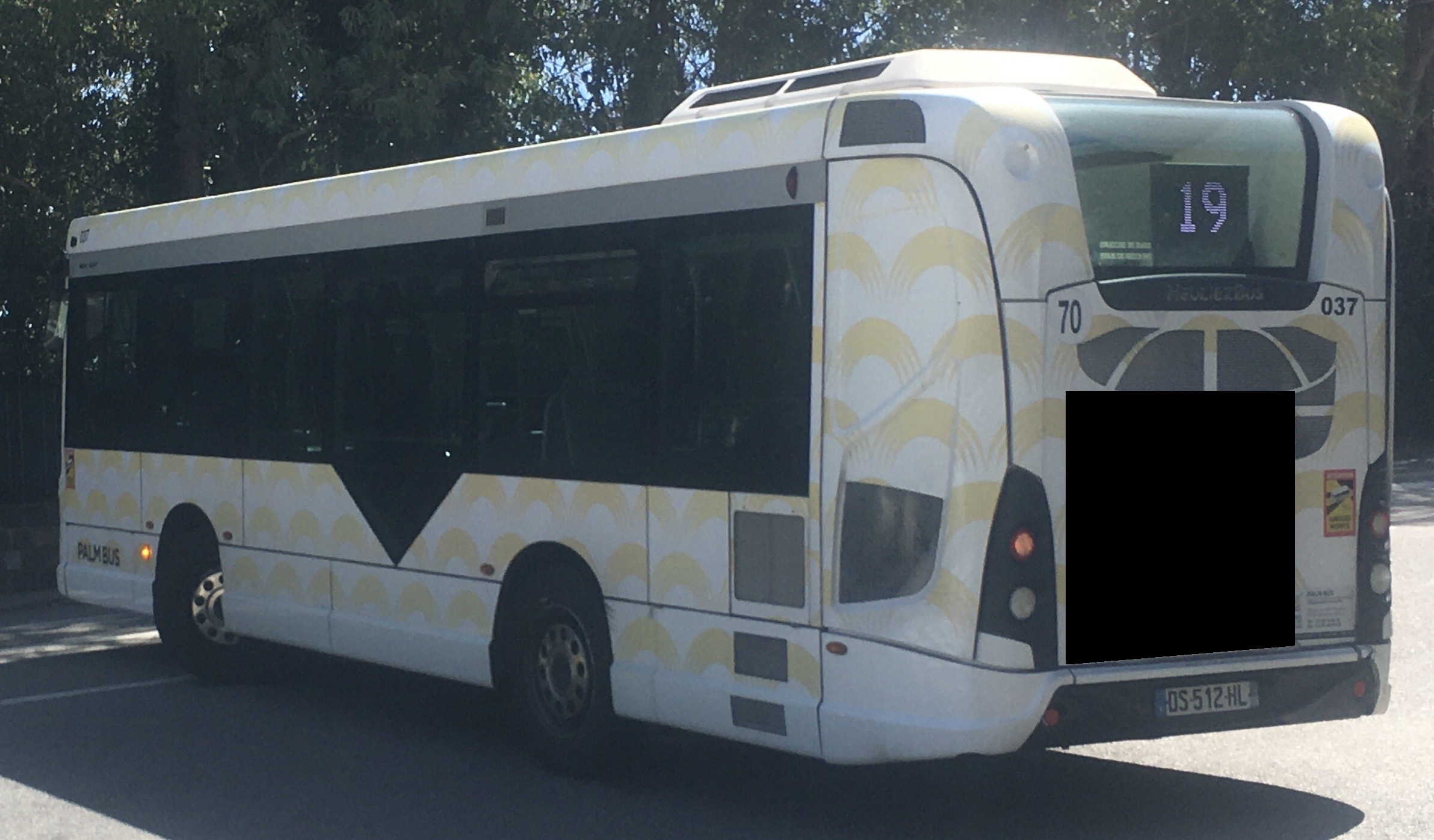
Heuliez GX 137

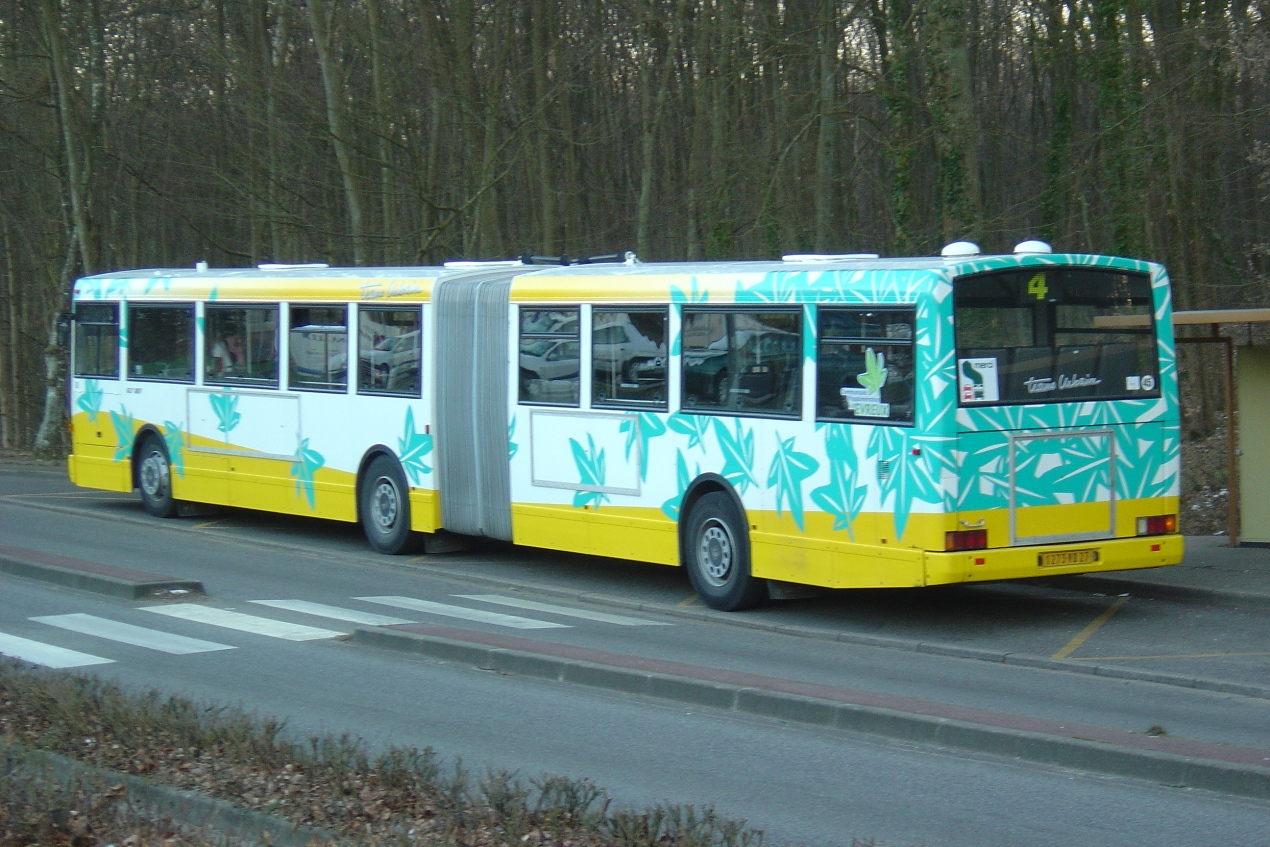
Heuliez GX 187

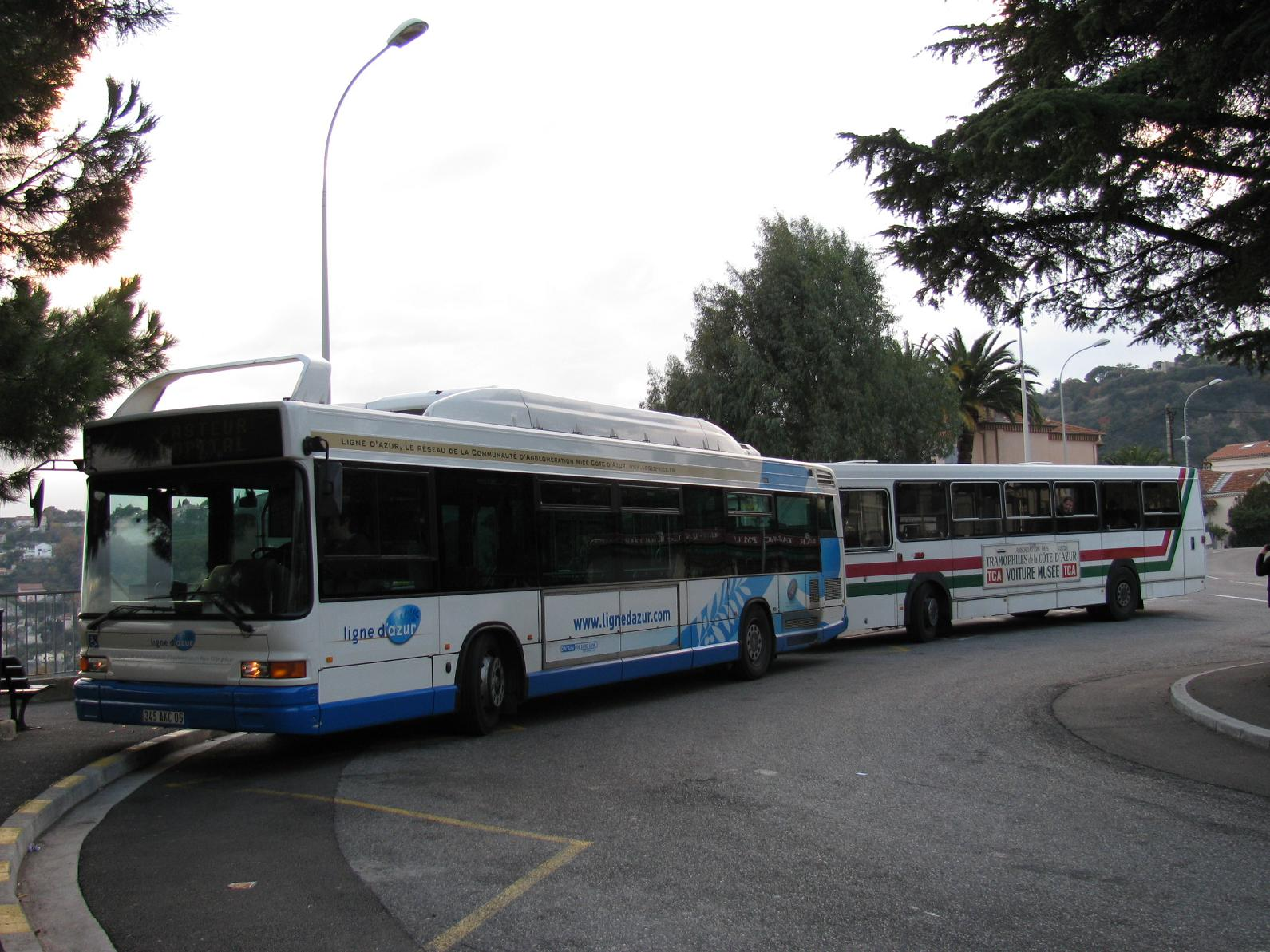
Heuliez GX 217 CNG

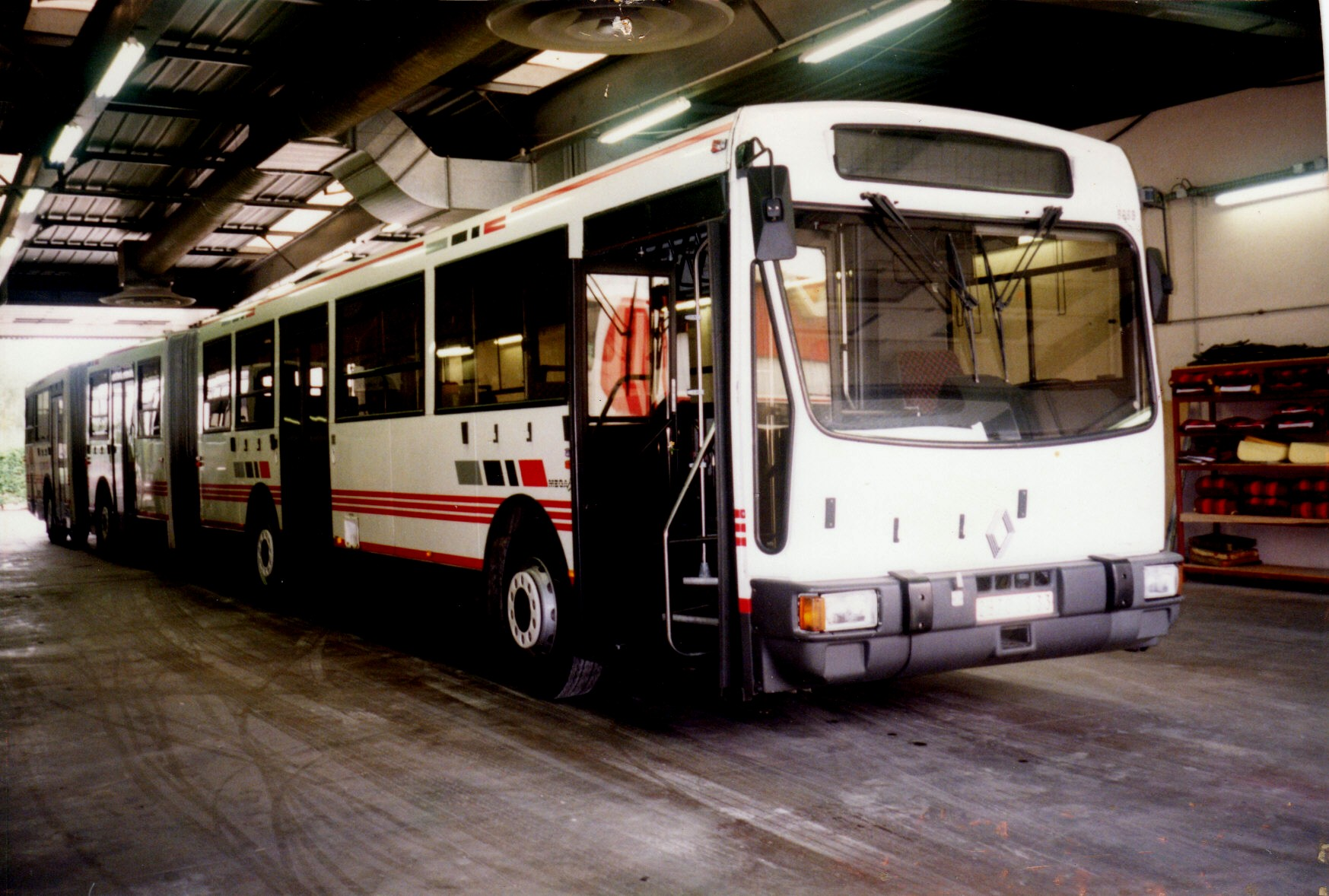
Heuliez GX 237

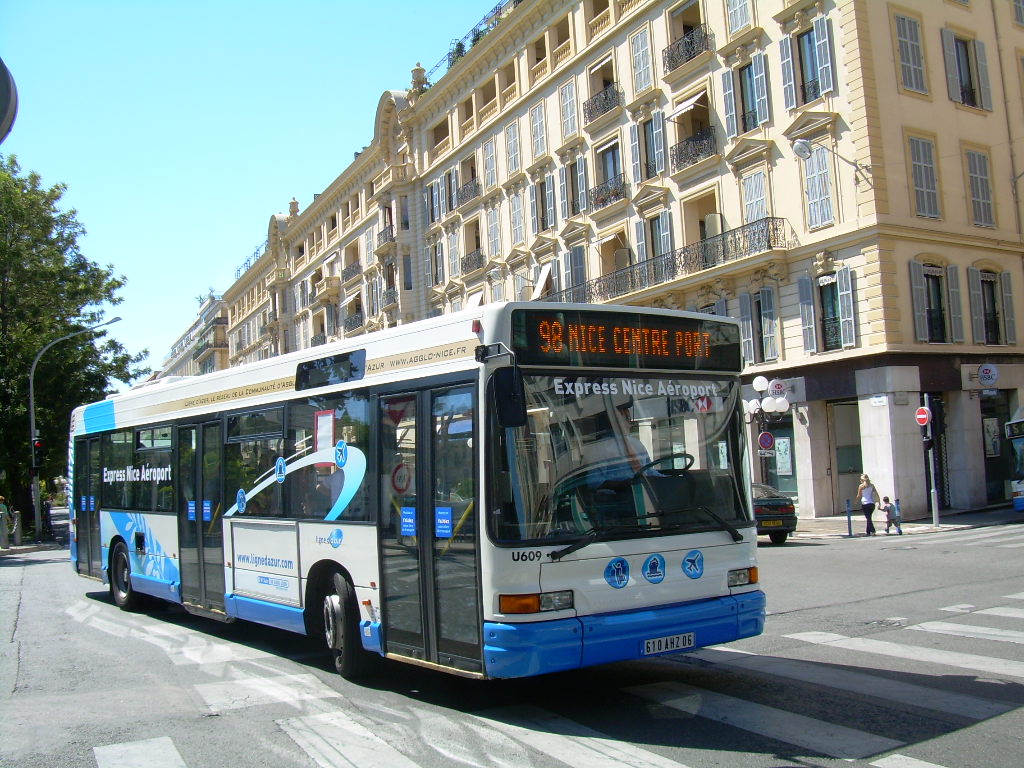
Heuliez GX 317

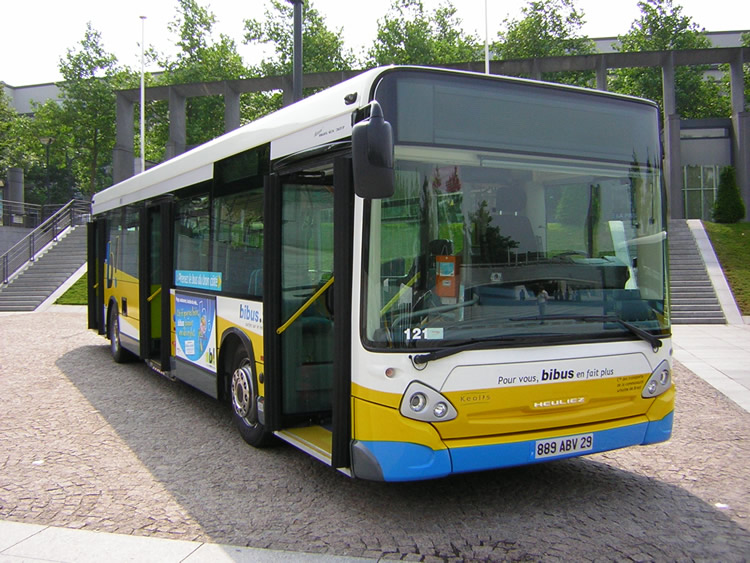
Heuliez GX 327

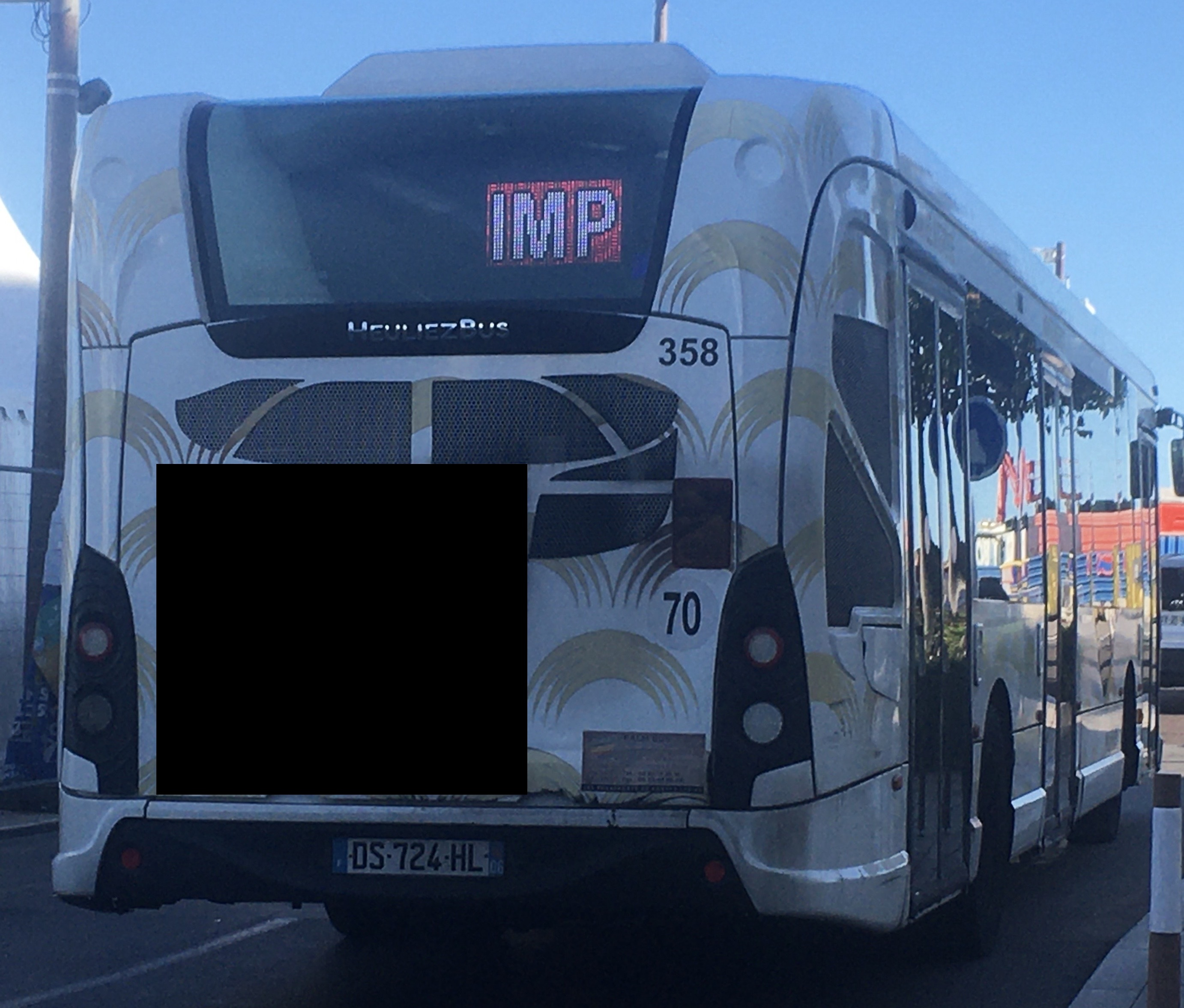
Heuliez GX 337

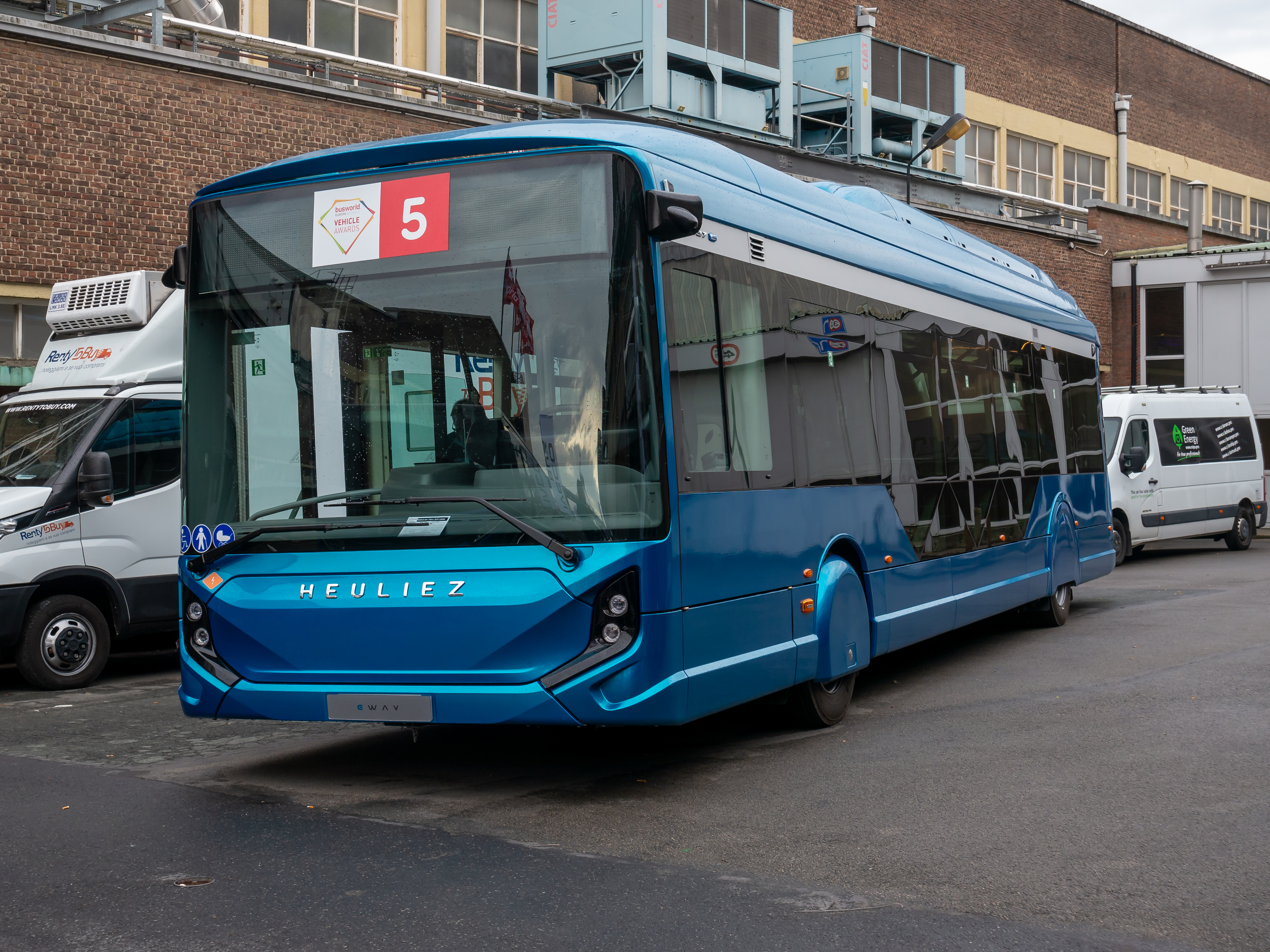
Heuliez E-Way GX 337 E

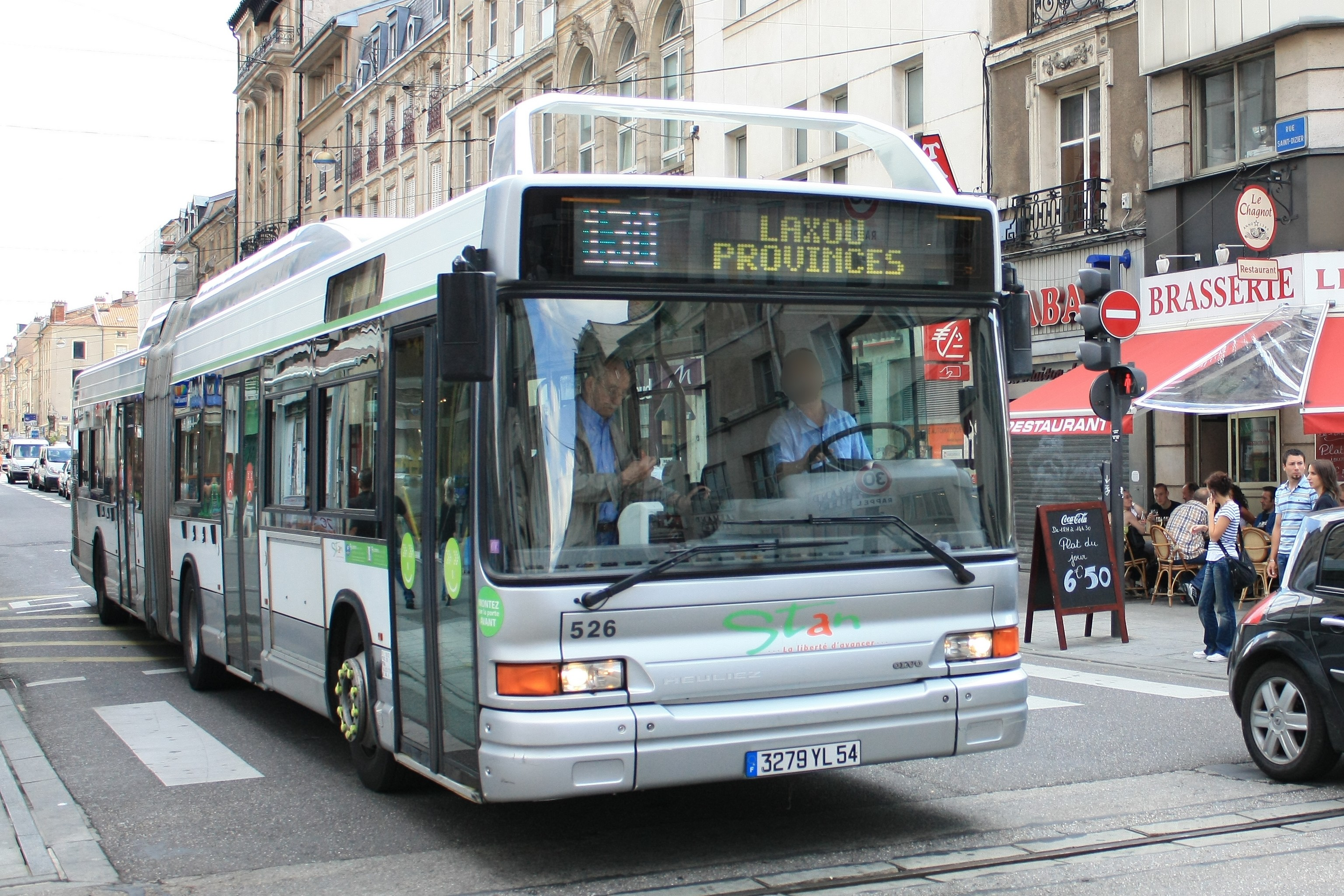
Heuliez GX 417

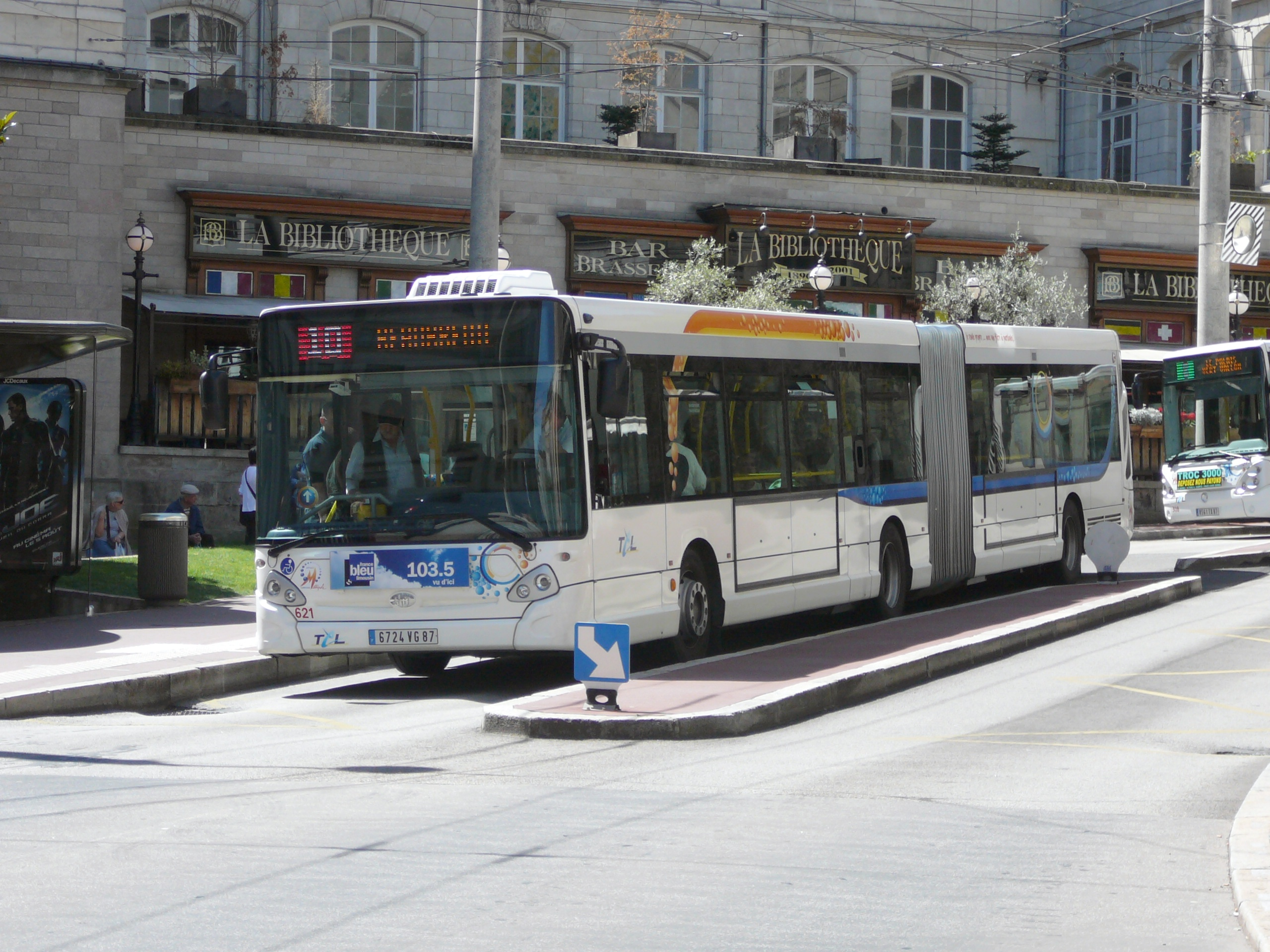
Heuliez GX 427

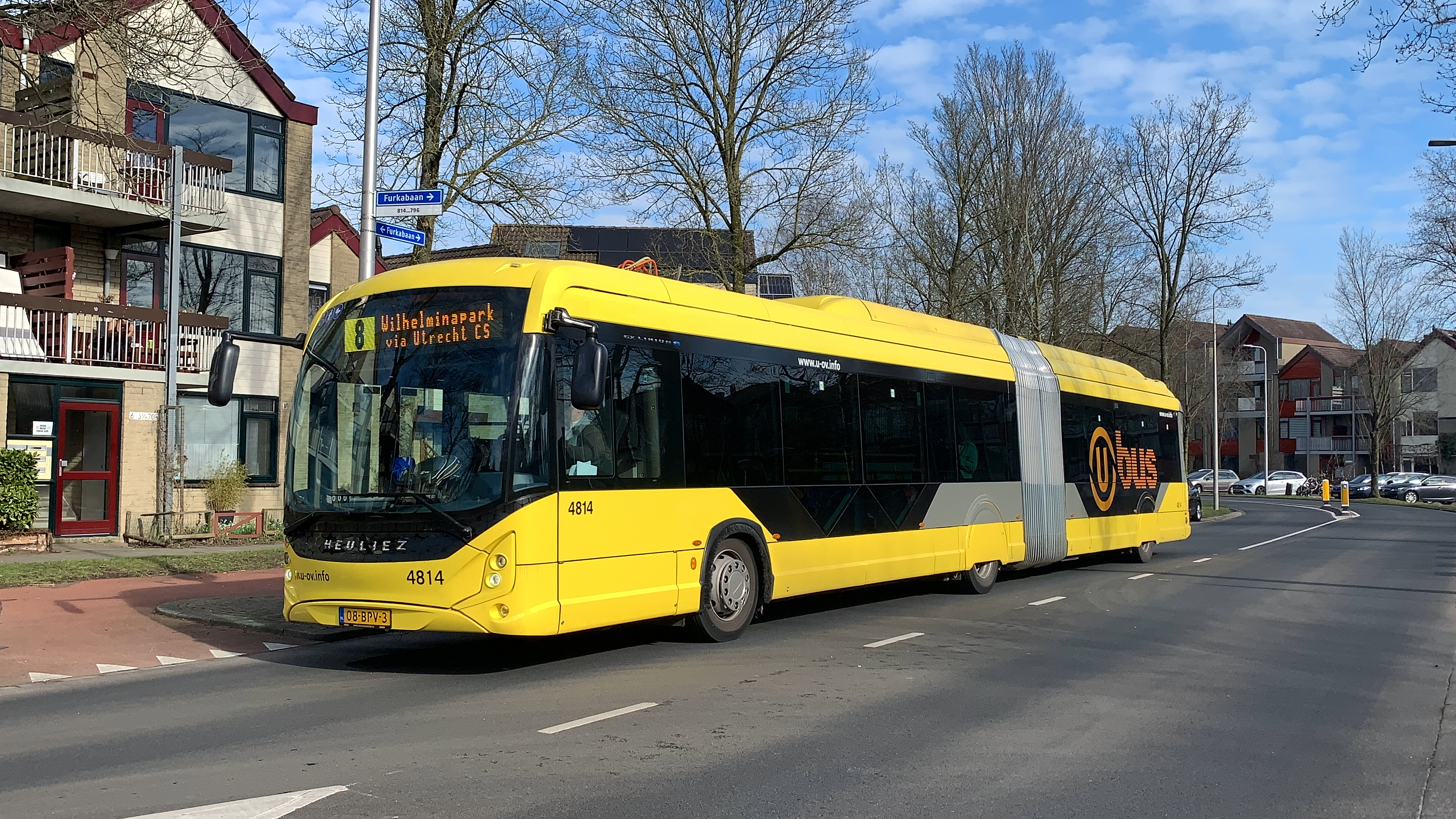
Heuliez GX 437
