= Renault PR180 =

French step-entrance articulated bus chassis

Renault PR180 and PR180.2
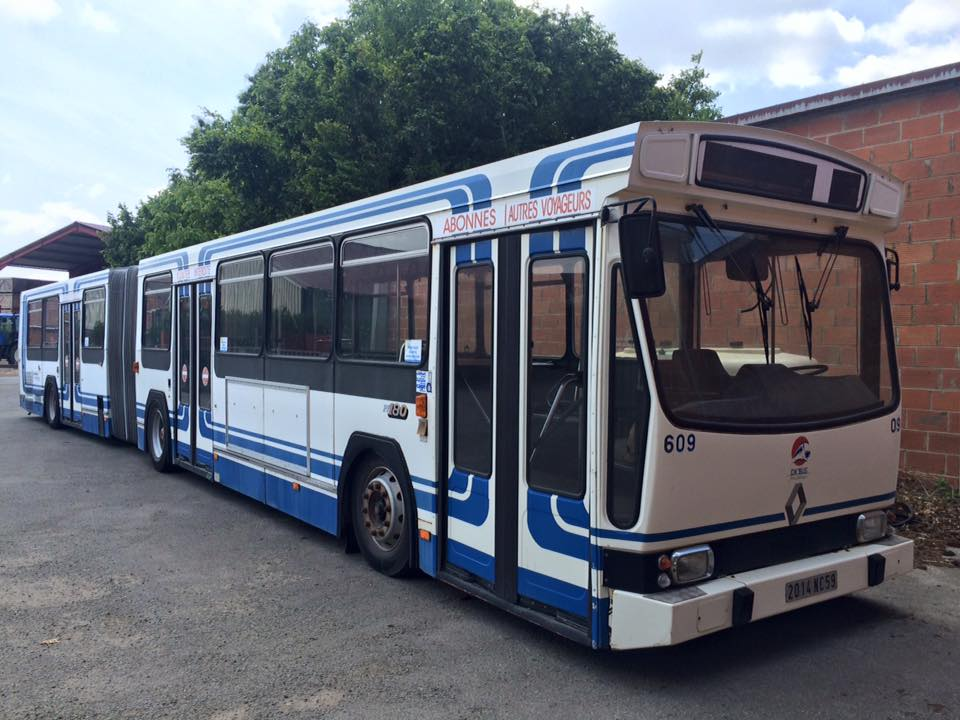

Overview
- Manufacturer: Renault Véhicules Industriels
- Assembly: Lyon, France

Body and chassis
- Doors: 2 or 3
- Floor type: Step-entrance
- Related: Renault PR100.2; Jelcz PR110

Powertrain
- Capacity: 65 to 80 seated

Dimensions
- Length: 18.1 - 19.0 metres
- Width: 2.5 metres
- Height: 3.3 metres

The Renault PR180 and PR180.2 was a step-entrance articulated bus chassis produced by Renault Véhicules Industriels in Lyon, France. The PR180 was based on Renault's popular PR100 rigid bus, and shares many common components. Once a common sight in many French cities, most PR180.2s are now at the end of their useful lives and reside with small private operators.

The Renault PR180 was designed around an interesting and unusual concept. Most articulated buses only have one driving axle - either the centre axle or the rear axle, however, the PR180 featured two driving axles - centre and rear.

== Australia ==
=== ACTION ===
ACTION purchased 34 PR180.2 buses between 1987 and 1993. These buses were badged as Macks and bodied by Ansair at Tullamarine. The first batch of 27 buses was delivered to ACTION from 1988 to 1989 with some equipped with a centre door which was later removed. A second batch of 7 buses was delivered in 1993.

=== Transperth ===
Transperth purchased 65 PR180.2 buses from 1988 until 1989. These were badged as Renaults and bodied by JW Bolton. All retained the PR100 front-end.

== Heuliez GX 237 ==
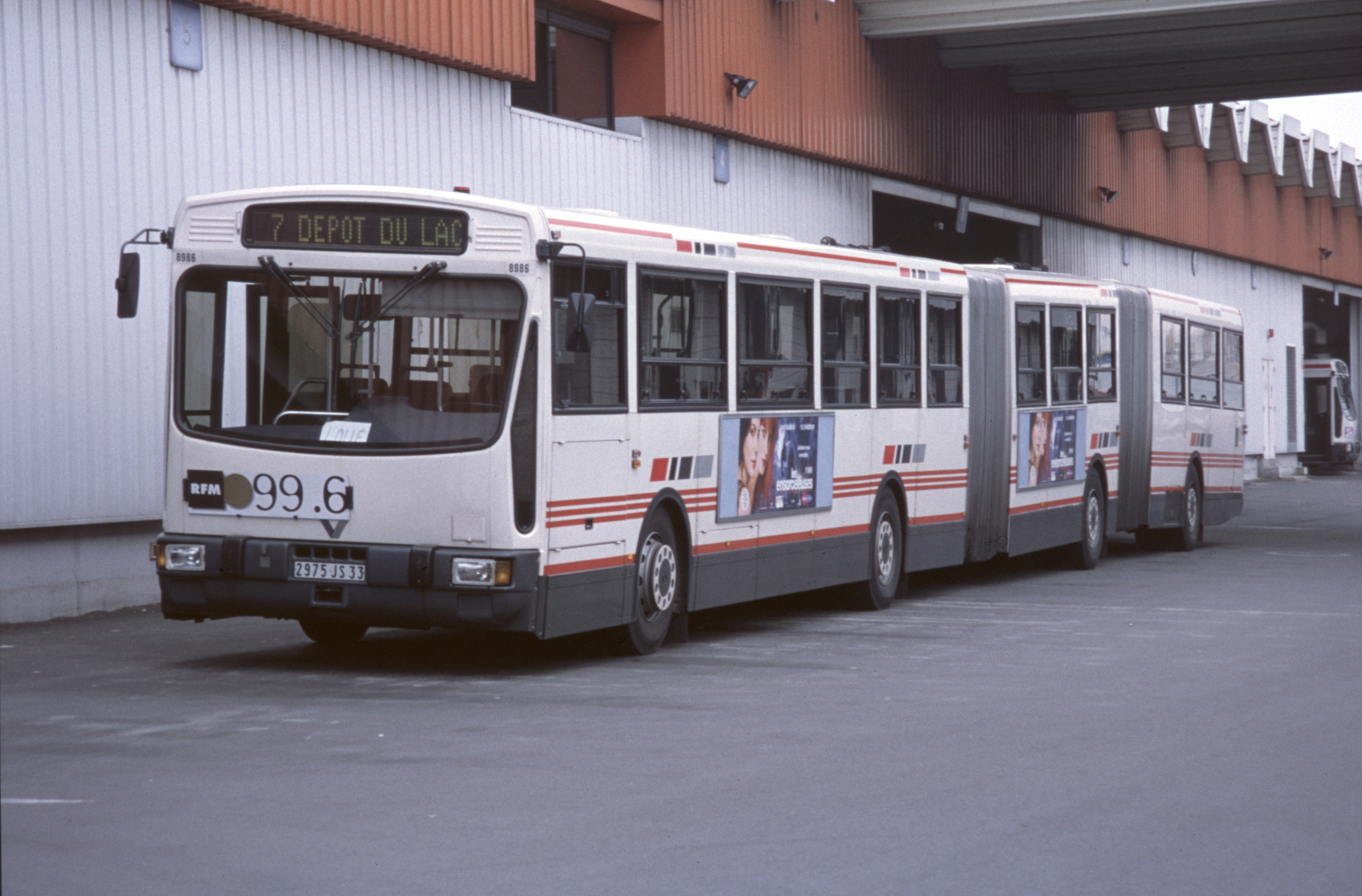
Heuliez GX 237

A bi-articulated version of the PR180.2 known as the "Mégabus" was developed by Heuliez Bus and Renault in the 1980s. Ten were purchased by CGFTE in 1989 which was used in Bordeaux until the tram network was opened in 2004.
