= Renault PR100 =

French single-decker bus chassis

Renault PR100 and PR100.2
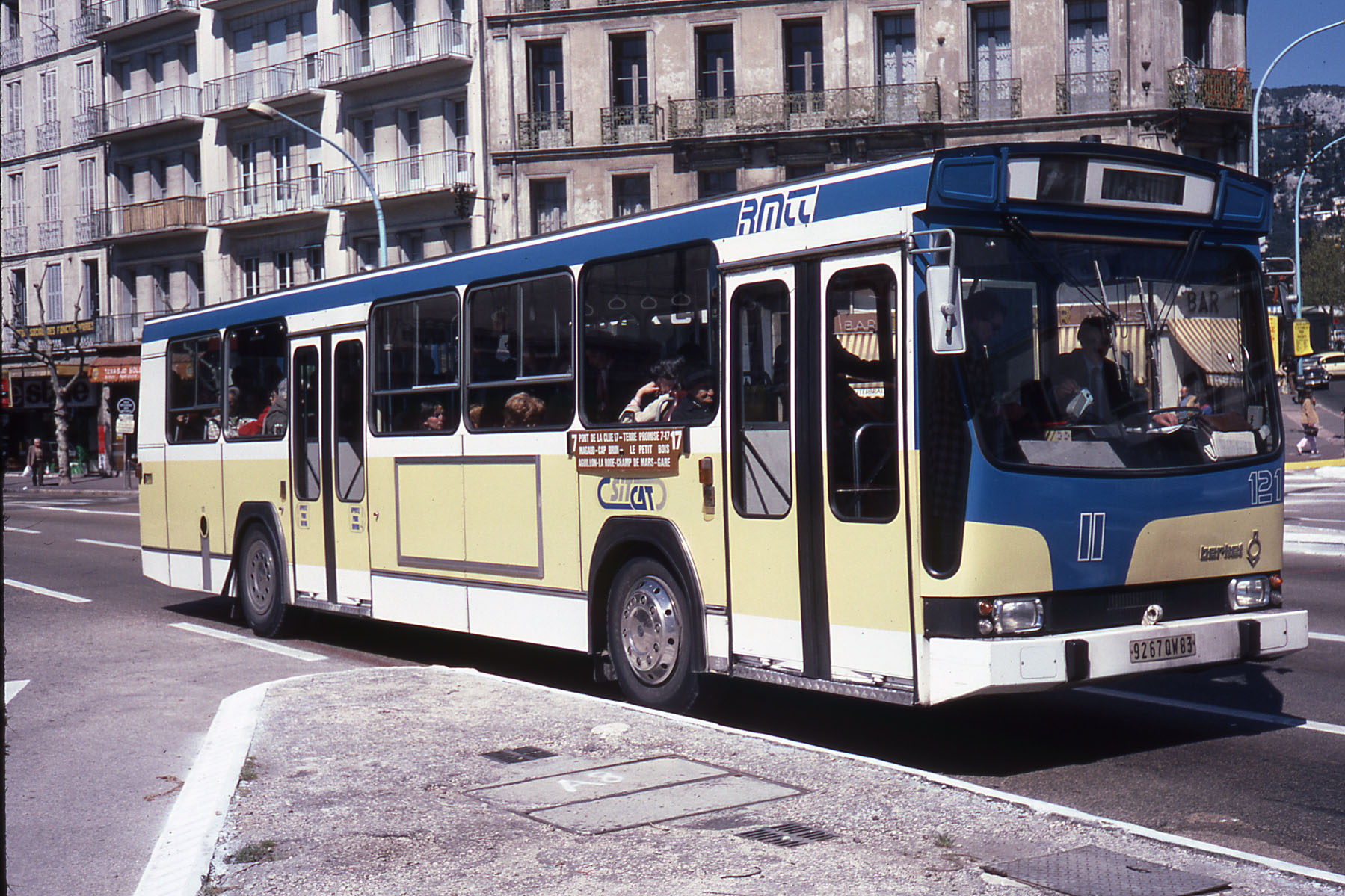
- A PR100.PB in Toulon

Overview
- Manufacturer: Renault Véhicules Industries
- Production: 1971–1999
- Assembly: Saint-Priest, France

Body and chassis
- Class: Bus chassis
- Doors: 1, 2 or 3
- Floor type: Step-entrance
- Related: Renault PR180; Jelcz PR110; Jelcz M11; Jelcz 120M; Renault ER100; Renault ER100H

Powertrain
- Capacity: 31 to 40 seated

Dimensions
- Wheelbase: 5.6 metres
- Length: 11.32 metres
- Width: 2.5 metres
- Height: 3.0 metres
- Curb weight: 14.4–18.0 tonnes

Chronology
- Successor: Renault R312

The Renault PR100 is a French full-size step-entrance single-decker bus chassis built and marketed originally by Berliet from 1971, and sold as a Renault following the merging of Berliet into Renault Véhicules Industriels.

The PR100 was intended to be replaced by the 1987 Renault R312 but sales continued with a revised model called the PR100.2 and in 1993 with a further revised version called the PR112 with the last delivery in 1999. Over 13,500 buses of the PR100 range were produced in France. An articulated version was also produced from 1980, the Renault PR180.

== PR100 and PR100.2 ==
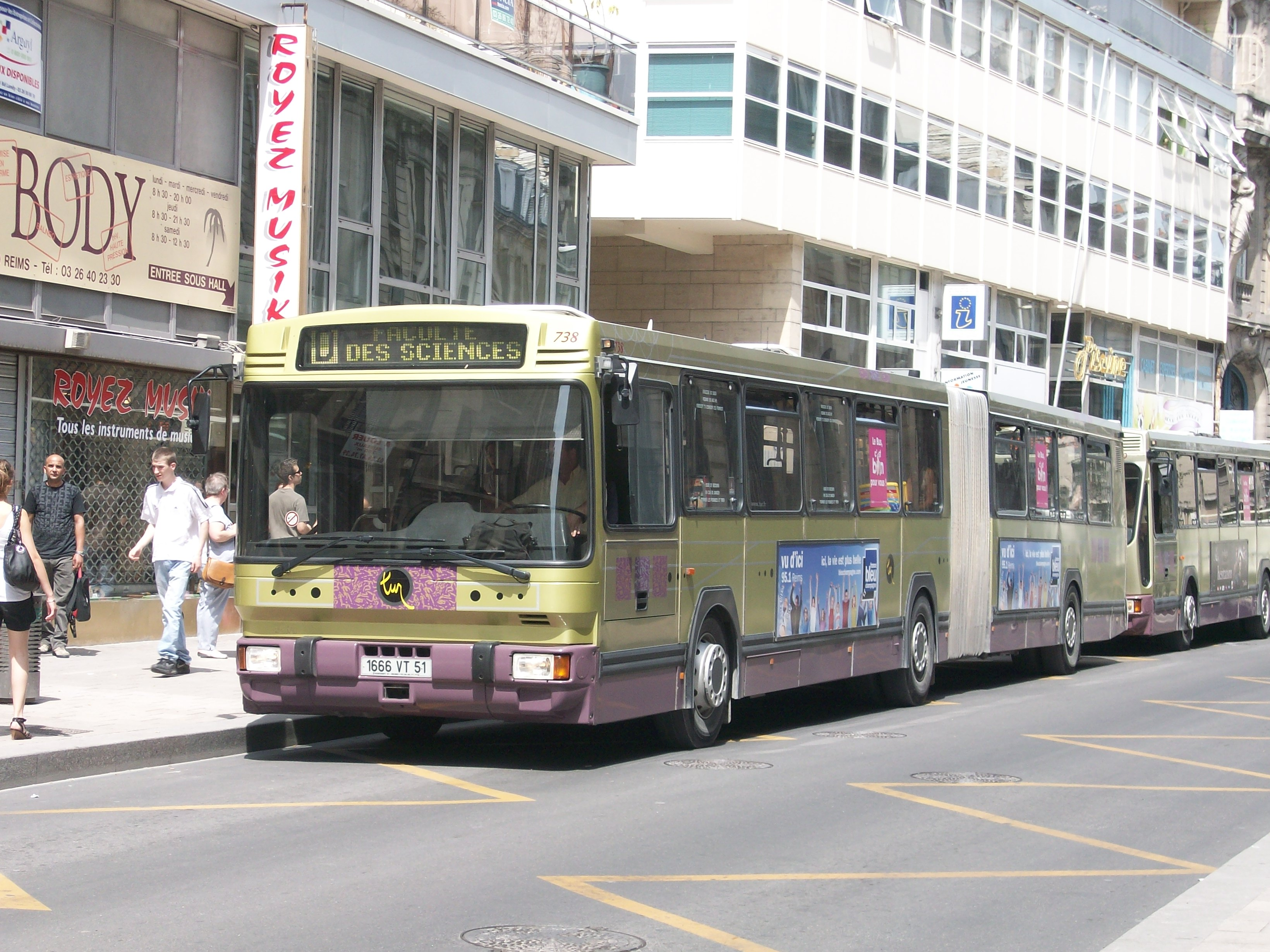
A Renault PR118

The original PR100 was developed and manufactured by Berliet using mainly plans of the German "VÖV-Standard-Linienbus" of the late 1960s with an altered front-end and back. It was 11.23m long and had a wheelbase of 5.6m. It had a different interior to the German VÖV, with three variations of seating/standing combinations available with 2 or 3 doors. The engine was mounted underfloor in the rear. At first it was available with a Perkins V8.510 diesel engine producing 178 PS (131 kW; 176 bhp). By 1973 a Berliet diesel engine was available (PR100.PB). From 1979 the PR100 featured the Renault badge.

The PR100 received a slightly altered front end in 1984, along with some technical improvements. This new model was called the PR100.2 and can be identified by the revised front bumper arrangement incorporating the lights with an asymmetrical windscreen, arched top and a separately mounted destination display in the new front end.

The PR100 was mainly used in France, with some exported to Algeria, Australia and Morocco. The design was used by Jelcz in Poland under license, and large numbers were delivered to many Polish cities. The PR100.2 chassis was also assembled in Spain, with Hispano Carrocera bodywork but retaining the Renault front for early models.

The PR100.2 was available with a Renault MPS turbo diesel 6-cylinder engine with two power options; 206 PS (152 kW; 203 bhp) and 900 N⋅m (664 lb⋅ft) or 253 PS (186 kW; 250 bhp) and 1,000 N⋅m (738 lb⋅ft). The gearbox was a four-speed ZF automatic unit.

The PR100.2's body was 11.4m long on a wheelbase of 5.6m and 2.5m wide.

The PR100 was launched in the United Kingdom in 1988 with bodywork by Northern Counties of Wigan, marketed as a competitor to the Leyland Lynx integral single-deck. Only one demonstrator was subsequently delivered to London Regional Transport's East London business unit, followed by a further three delivered with additional nearside and offside centre doors for use as airside buses at London Luton Airport. Additionally in 1989, a PR100 bodied by Ansair of Australia was exported to Singapore as a demonstrator operated by Singapore Bus Services, however, demonstration was unsuccessful and the unit returned to the manufacturer.

When Renault became the majority shareholder of Mack Trucks, Renault demonstrated the bus in Australia in 1985. ACTION purchased 258 and Transperth 250 PR100.2s. The ACTION buses were badged as Macks and bodied by Ansair, the Transperth examples as Renaults and bodied in Perth by Howard Porter, JW Bolton and Volgren. All retained the PR100 front-end.

== PR112 ==
In 1993 the PR112 was launched as an updated and revised version of the PR100 with a new front end designed by Safra, losing the distinctive windscreen and front quarterlight design. The last PR112 was delivered in 1999.

== The articulated buses PR180 and PR118 ==
The PR180 was a tri-axle articulated version of the PR100 and was referred to in marketing literature as the Megabus. Standard configuration was for 62 seats and 144 standing. The front half retained the 5.6m wheelbase of the PR100, with the rear half being 5.15m and an overall length of 24.38m. Its engined produced 302 PS (222 kW; 298 bhp).

ACTION purchased 34 and Transperth 65. The ACTION buses were badged as Macks and bodied by Ansair, the Transperth examples as Renaults and bodied by JW Bolton. All retained the PR100 front-end.

It was replaced in 1993 by the PR112 based PR118.

== The trolleybus versions ER100 and PER180 ==
A trolleybus version of the PR100 was produced, called the ER100, and an articulated version with two fronts called the PER180. Berliet and Renault built the ER100 and PER180 for several French cities including Grenoble, Lyon, Marseille, Nancy and Saint-Étienne.
