= Jelcz M125M =

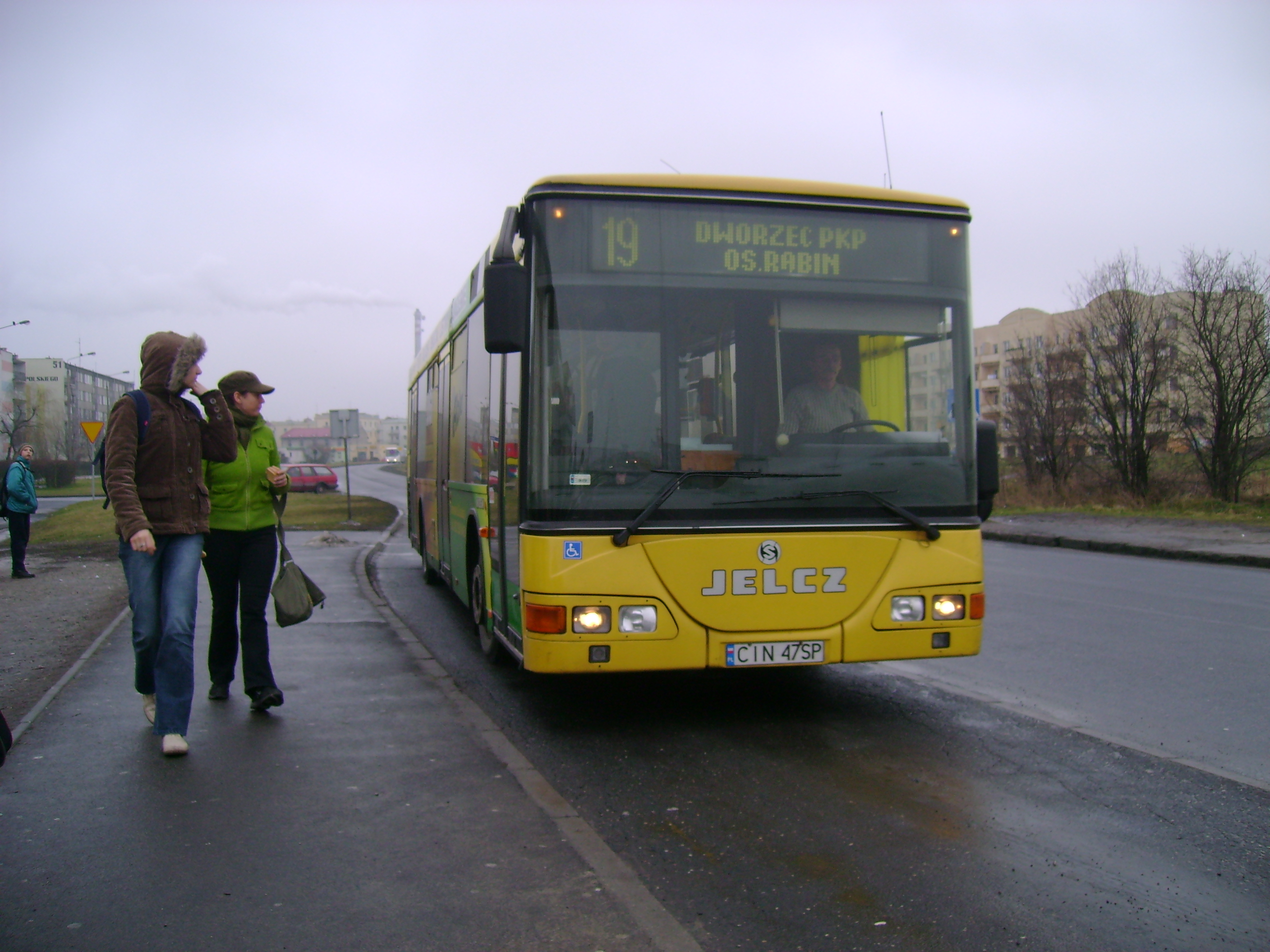

Overview
- Manufacturer: Zakłady Samochodowe Jelcz S.A.
- Also called: Jelcz M125M "Dana" (1998-2001); Jelcz M125M "Vecto" (2001-2008)
- Production: 1998-2006 (formally 2008)
- Assembly: Poland, Jelcz-Laskowice

Body and chassis
- Class: Commercial vehicle
- Body style: Full size rigid low-floor bus
- Layout: Rear-engine rear-wheel-drive
- Doors: 1 door, 2 doors or 3 doors (1 front)/(1 front, 1 centre)/(1 front, 1 centre, 1 rear)
- Floor type: Low floor
- Related: Jelcz M125M/4 CNG

Powertrain
- Engine: MAN D0826 LUH12; MAN D0826 LUH02
- Transmission: Voith D851.3; Voith D854.3E; ZF 5HP500

Dimensions
- Wheelbase: 5950mm
- Length: 11,970m (11.97 metres)
- Width: 2500mm
- Height: 2850mm
- Curb weight: 18000kg

The Jelcz M125M (to 2001 called "Dana", after "Vecto") – 12-meters long, first rigid (non-articulated) full-size low-floor bus designed by Zakłady Samochodowe Jelcz S.A. in Jelcz-Laskowice (and the first Polish 100% low-floor bus). Produced from 1998 to 2006, it was supplied by Jelcz until their collapse in 2008. It is a competitor to the other full-size low-floor buses from other European countries.

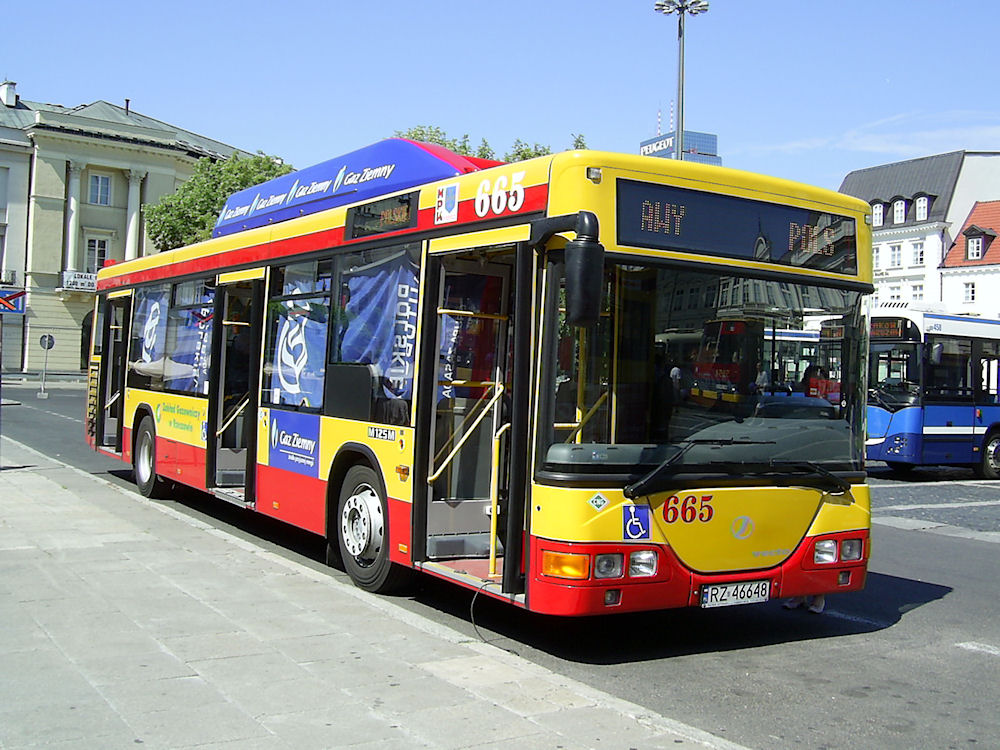
Jelcz M125M CNG

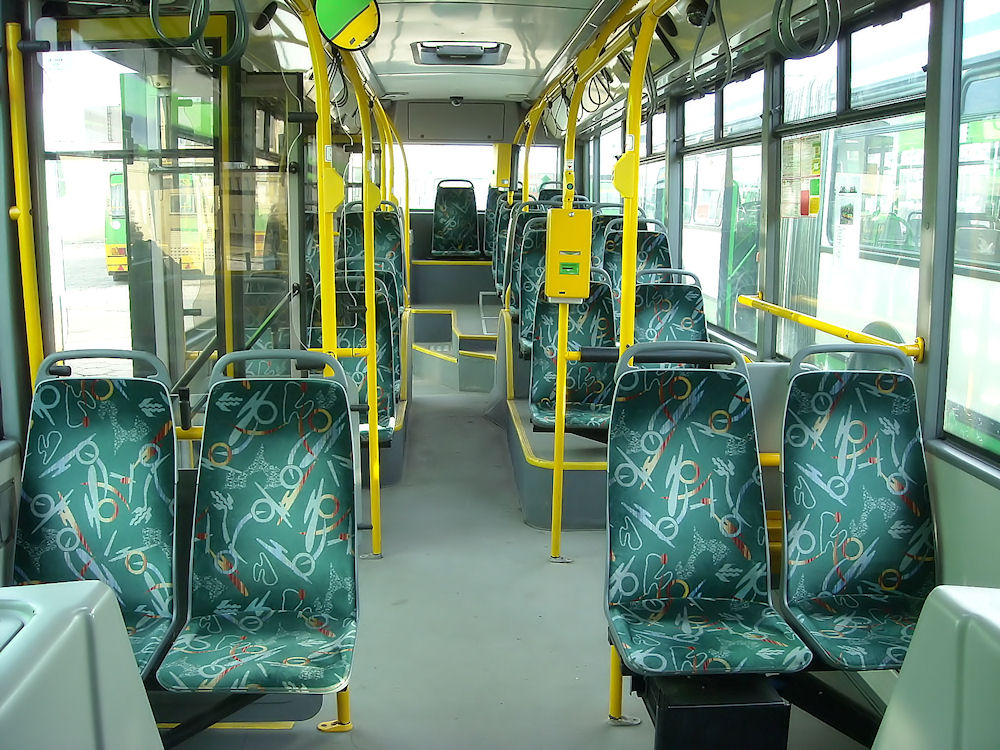
Bus interior

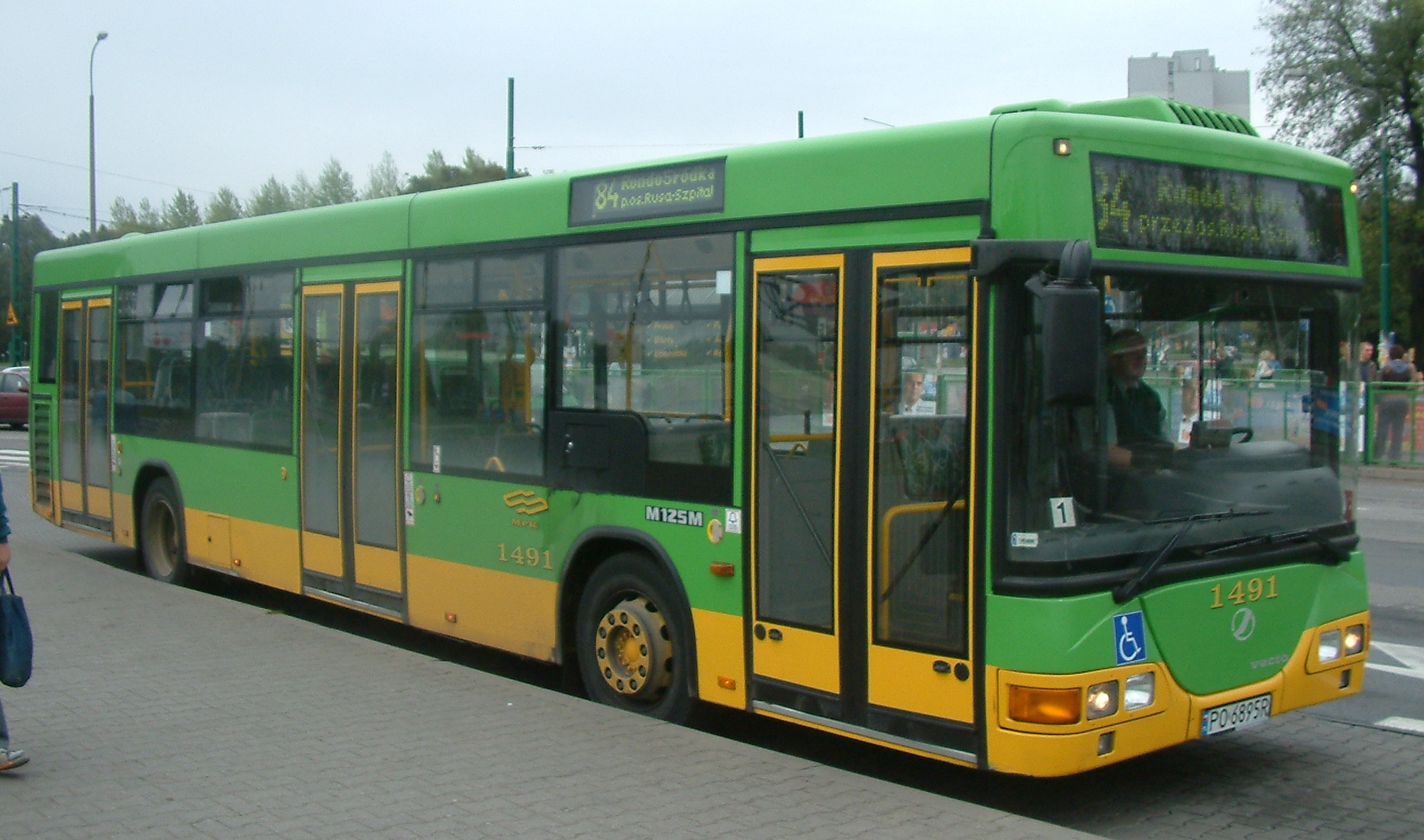
Jelcz M125M in Poznań

The M125M Vecto model was created from scratch and was not directly structurally based on the previous vehicles from Jelcz. Compared to buses previously produced by Zakłady Samochodowe, Jelcz differed primarily in the drive unit, which was the MAN D0826 engine with 220 HP.

== See also ==
- Jelcz M11 (step entrance full-size)
- Jelcz PR110 (step entrance full-size)
- Jelcz PR110D (low floor coach)
