= Ikarus-Zemun IK160P =

Bus manufactured by Jelcz company

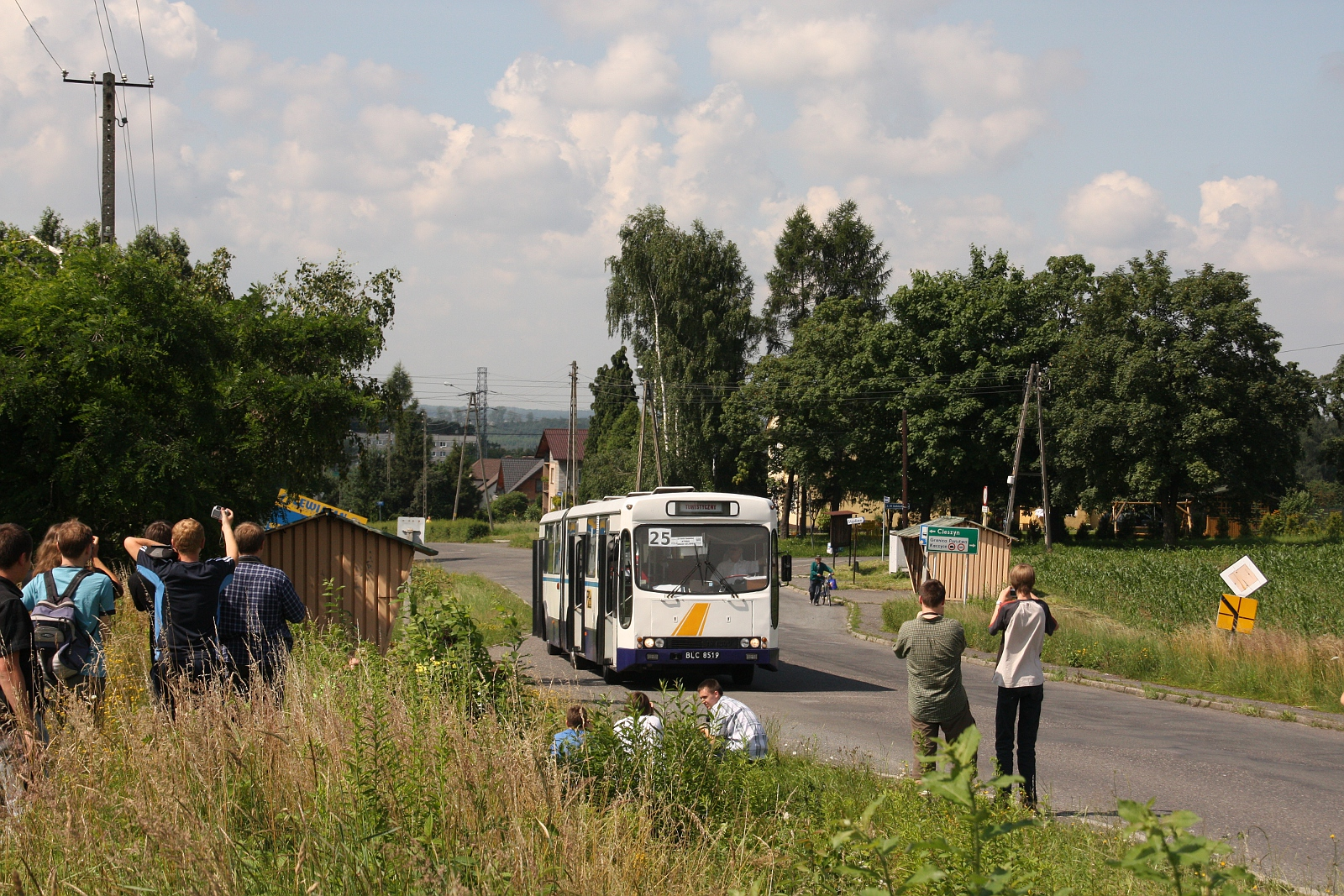

Overview
- Production: 1982–1991
- Assembly: Jelcz-Laskowice, Poland; Zemun, Serbia

Body and chassis
- Body style: MEGA-class high-floor articulated bus
- Doors: 3

Powertrain
- Engine: WS Mielec SW680/56/4; 136 kW (185 hp)
- Transmission: 6-speed S6-90

Dimensions
- Wheelbase: 5,250 mm (207 in)
- Length: 16,760 mm (660 in)
- Width: 2,450 mm (96 in)
- Height: 3,030 mm (119 in)
- Curb weight: 22,000 kg (49,000 lb)

The Ikarus-Zemun IK160P was a high-floor, articulated bus designed for suburban, local, and urban transport. It was assembled between 1982 and 1991 by Jelcz using chassis and bodies provided by the Yugoslav company Ikarus-Zemun. Approximately 880 units were produced. During its operation, due to a decrease in the number of passengers transported, some of the IK160P buses were converted into non-articulated units.

== History ==
=== Origins ===
In the spring of 1972, the Yugoslav company Ikarus, previously known for producing airplanes, decided to expand its operations and begin bus manufacturing. At the same time, the authorities of the Polish People's Republic decided to modernize the country's urban transport fleets and expand its city networks. Initially, only high-capacity buses (from 11 to 12 meters long) were needed. Through Polish-French cooperation, the 12-meter Jelcz PR110 bus was developed, featuring three pairs of doors. These vehicles were made with 50% of their parts imported from France.

The economic crisis of the 1980s left the Polish People's Republic without the foreign currency needed to purchase parts for these vehicles. In early 1984, the cost of imported parts for one bus was $2,000 USD. Jelcz urgently sought domestic alternatives to avoid production halts. Despite being unable to purchase parts required for production, the production in Polish factories continued. Additionally, the WSK Mielec engine factory could only produce a maximum of 1,000 engines annually. In 1981, a Polish-Yugoslav trade agreement was signed, leading to a collaboration between Jelcz and the Yugoslav TAM company.

There was also a shortage of high-capacity buses needed for suburban routes with high passenger volumes. As a result, an annex to the Polish-Yugoslav trade agreement was signed for the supply of components for Ikarus Zemun IK160 buses. The buses produced in Poland were designated with an additional letter P (similar to the Fiat 127p) to differentiate them from the non-Polish made ones.

=== Production ===
The first components were sent to the Jelcz factory in December 1982.

The vehicle bodies and chassis were produced at the Ikarbus factory in Zemun, Belgrade. The assembly of the Polish powertrain was also carried out in Yugoslavia. The Jelcz-Laskowice factory completed the final assembly by installing seats (identical to those in the PR110), handrails, and other interior elements.

These buses were showcased at the Jelcz booth in 1987, 1988, and 1989. The last batch of 25 buses was completed in 1991. However, there were no buyers for these vehicles, and they could only be sold in 1993.

Approximately 880 buses of the IK160P type were built through the Polish-Yugoslav cooperation.

=== Operation ===
Initially, the Ikarus Zemun IK160P buses were intended for suburban and local routes. Over time, they were also used for urban connections.

Due to a lack of demand for high-capacity buses, and to reduce operating costs, many units were converted into rigid busses by removing the trailer section.

In July 2011, one of the last units in operation (PKS Przasnysz) was acquired by the Warsaw Public Transport Enthusiasts Club for preservation as a historical vehicle. This unit, in the late 1980s, had operated express routes between Przasnysz and Warsaw. These buses were also seen in Warsaw operated by PKS Grójec. The base version, Ikarus IK 160, was operated in Yugoslavia, Romania, and Turkey.

MPK Poznań purchased 15 "Zemun" buses in 1992 for the newly built bus depot on Darzyborska Street (in Darzybór). These buses were kept in service until 2002. The Rail Vehicle Enthusiasts Club organized a farewell event with #1576 bus leading. All buses, except #1580, which was converted into a technical vehicle, were scrapped.

=== Preserved units ===
Artur Lemański's private museum in Paterek near Bydgoszcz houses two units – a complete IK160P formerly used by PTS Bustrans Tychy and a shortened two-door rigid bus version.

The Warsaw Public Transport Enthusiasts Club owns a complete unit previously belonging to PKS Przasnysz.

Modertrans Poznań has one unit that belonged to MPK Poznań until 2002 and bore the fleet number #1580. After being retired, it was modified into a rigid-bus-based technical rescue vehicle, i.e., it also had its rear section removed. It has likely been out of use since around 2012, as it no longer has license plates.

== Construction ==
=== Chassis ===
==== Powertrain ====
The bus is powered by a naturally aspirated WS Mielec SW 680/56/4 diesel engine, a version of the Leyland O.680 engine built under licence. It has a displacement of 11.1 liters, and generates a maximum power of 185 hp (136 kW); its BMEP is 0.8 MPa. The engine is located under the floor between the first and second axles (in the front section). The power is transmitted through a S6-90 gearbox that was produced by FSP Polmo Tczew in Poland.

==== Suspension and braking system ====
The bus is equipped with axles produced by the Hungarian Rába company. The front axle is a RABA-IKARUS V039.32.140 axle, the middle axle is a RABA 018.15-3300 one, and the rear axle is a RABA-IKARUS V140.32.100 one. Drum brakes were installed on all wheels. The bus has two braking systems, a service brake with adjustable braking force and a parking brake. The wheelbase is 5,250 mm + 6,100 mm. By standard, the IK160P has 11.00 R20 tires.

=== Body ===
==== Frame and bodywork ====
The bus has a body-on-frame design with a ladder frame. Unlike the Yugoslav original, several minor changes were made to the IK160P's body. Some design features were later used in the construction of the body for the Jelcz M11. The articulated joint is identical to those used in other Yugoslav articulated buses.

==== Doors ====
The bus is equipped with doors in a 2-2-0-2 layout. The doors are of a double-leaf type, and opened inward. They copies of the doors used in the German-made MAN SG192 and Mercedes-Benz O305 buses.

==== Seats ====
The buses produced in Poland are equipped with seats identical to those in Polish Berliets and Jelcz buses assembled in Jelcz during that period. The bus offers 47 seats and 98 standing places (145 total). The seats are soft, covered with artificial leather, and padded with foam.

==== Electrical system and lighting ====
The Ikarus-Zemun IK160P buses are fitted with front lights from the Jelcz PR110.

== Bibliography ==
- Stiasny, Marcin (2008). Atlas autobusów (in Polish). Poznań: Poznański Klub Modelarzy Kolejowych. ISBN 978-83-920757-4-5.
- Połomski, Wojciech (2011). Pojazdy samochodowe i przyczepy Jelcz 1971-1983 (in Polish). Warsaw: Wydawnictwa Komunikacji i Łączności. ISBN 978-83-206-1817-4.
