= Orzeł Futsal Jelcz-Laskowice =

Futsal club in Jelcz-Laskowice, Poland

- Full name: KS Orzeł Futsal Jelcz–Laskowice
- Nickname(s): Orły (The Eagles)
- Founded: 2015; 10 years ago
- Ground: CSiR Hall
- Capacity: 892

KS Orzeł Futsal Jelcz-Laskowice is a Polish futsal club based in Jelcz-Laskowice. Founded through an initiative of futsal fans from the Wrocław area, the club competed in the Ekstraklasa (futsal), the top tier of Polish futsal, from 2018 to 2021.

For the 2015–16 season, after Antonio Hotel became the club's titutal sponsor, the club was renamed to "KS Antonio Orzeł Futsal Jelcz-Laskowice".

Following the conclusion of the 2020–21 campaign, Orzeł withdrew from the Ekstraklasa due to financial issues, and has since focused on operating youth teams.

== Honours ==
- I liga South
  - Champions: 2017–18
  - Runners-up: 2016–17
