= Jelcz M11 =

Polish vintage bus

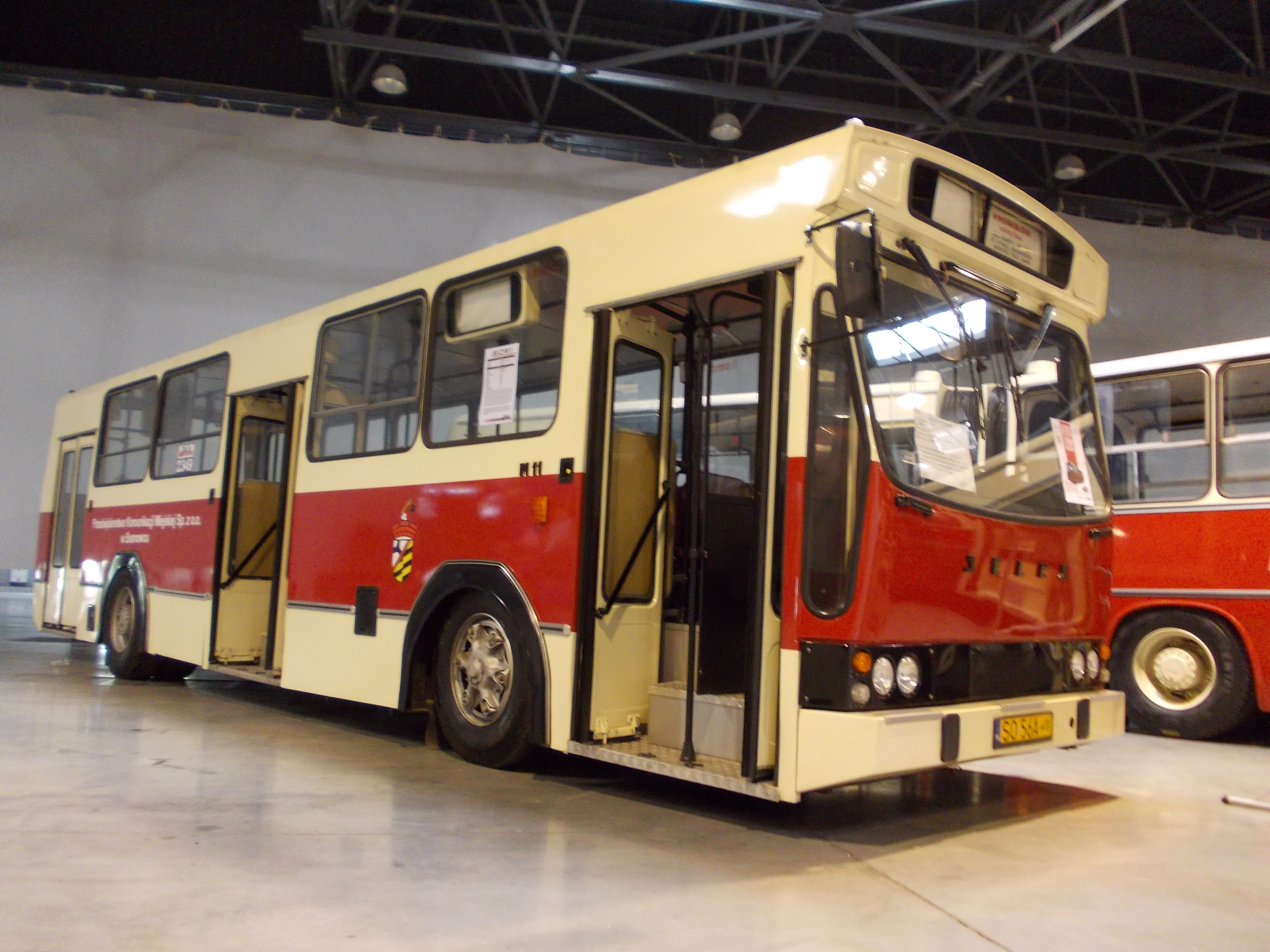

Overview
- Manufacturer: Jelczańskie Zakłady Samochodowe
- Production: 1989–1992
- Assembly: Poland, Jelcz-Laskowice

Body and chassis
- Class: Commercial vehicle
- Body style: step entrance rigid full-size bus
- Related: Ikarus 260

Powertrain
- Engine: Raba-MAN D2156HM6U
- Transmission: Csepel ASH75.2

Dimensions
- Wheelbase: 5.4 m
- Length: 11.000 m
- Width: 2.5 m
- Height: 3.08 m

Chronology
- Successor: Jelcz 120M

Jelcz M11 is a Polish step-entrance city bus manufactured by Jelczańskie Zakłady Samochodowe in Jelcz-Laskowice, near Oława. Manufactured from 1985 to 1990, the Jelcz M11 is a bus with a hybrid design, featuring a modified Jelcz PR110 body combined with the frame and drivetrain of the Ikarus 260.

== History ==
=== Genesis ===
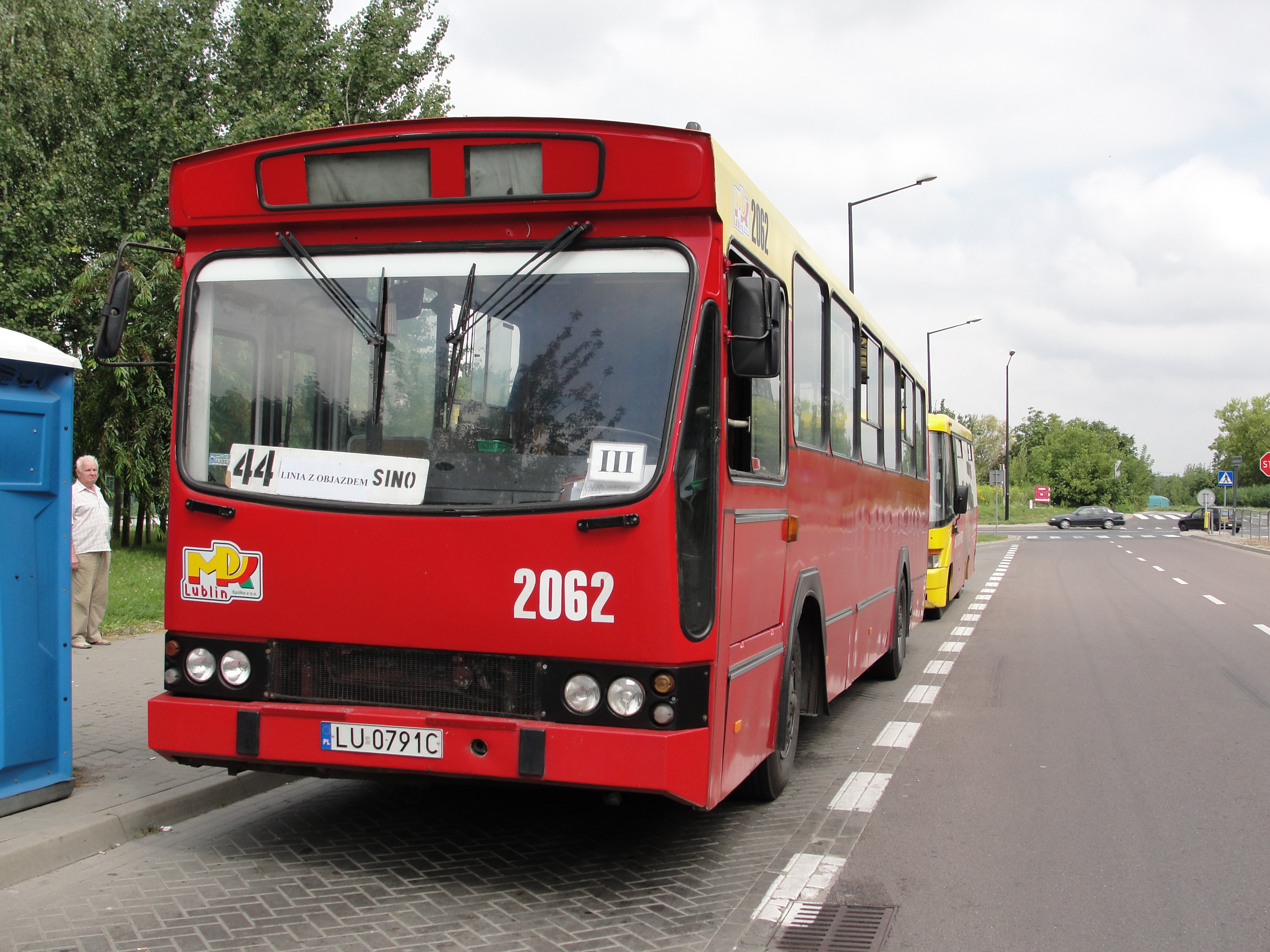
MPK Lublin Jelcz M11 in Lublin, Poland in 2009

In the early 1970s, the authorities of the Polish People's Republic decided to modernize their city transport fleet. Between 1970 and 1972, they conducted tests of various bus models in Warsaw, including the Hungarian Ikarus 242, West German Magirus-Deutz M170-S11H, French Berliet PR100, Italian Fiat 420A, British-Danish Leyland Lidrt 12/4 Worldmaster, Spanish Pegaso 5023, Japanese Hino RC620 and Czechoslovak Karosa ŠM 11. Of these models, the Berliet PR100 proved to be the most successful. Initially considered a temporary solution due to evolving transportation needs, the Berliet PR100's design was later modified to include a third set of double doors, resulting in the Jelcz PR110—a 12-meter bus featuring three sets of doors. Approximately 50% of the parts used in the Jelcz PR110 were imported from France.

The economic downturn of the 1980s caused a shortage of foreign currency in the Polish People's Republic, making it difficult to purchase parts needed for manufacturing these vehicles. By early 1984, assembling one bus with imported parts cost $2,000 USD. Domestic production of these parts was also unfeasible, and the WSK Mielec engine plant could only produce up to 1,000 engines per year. In response to these challenges, Poland decided to collaborate with Hungarian People's Republic. A trade agreement signed in Warsaw on October 24, 1983, led to the first deliveries of Hungarian-made Ikarus 260 buses and Csepel 260.88 chassis to Poland. In exchange, Hungary was receiving Polish Fiats 125p and 126p, as well as Star trucks. According to the agreement, Hungary was to deliver approximately 1,500 complete chassis equipped with engines and gearboxes between 1986 and 1990. The Jelcz M11 (initially named Jelcz M110) was intended as a transitional solution, with production planned to end upon the introduction of the new Jelcz M120, which was to be entirely manufactured by Polish industry. Issues with the M11's reliability accelerated the development of the M120 model.

=== Production ===
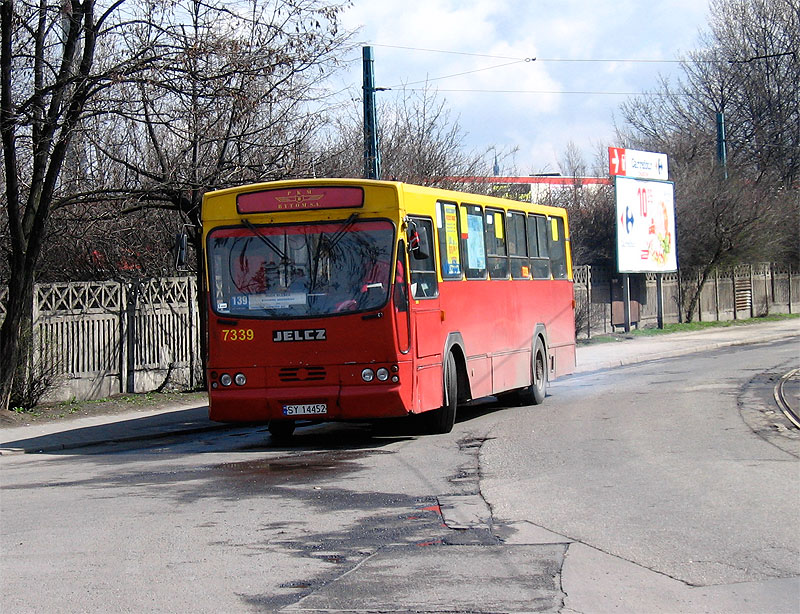
Jelcz M11 from PKM Bytom

The new Jelcz M11 bus was built on the Csepel 260.88 chassis with the engine. Its body, with minor modifications, was adapted from the Jelcz PR110. The first prototype was completed in 1983. During testing in Budapest, local polytechnic engineers conducted computer-based endurance tests on the structural elements of the bus. Serial production of the Jelcz M11 began in 1984 and continued alongside the Jelcz PR110 and, until 1986, the Jelcz 043. Production of the M11 concluded in 1990, with approximately 2,600 units produced.

=== Service ===
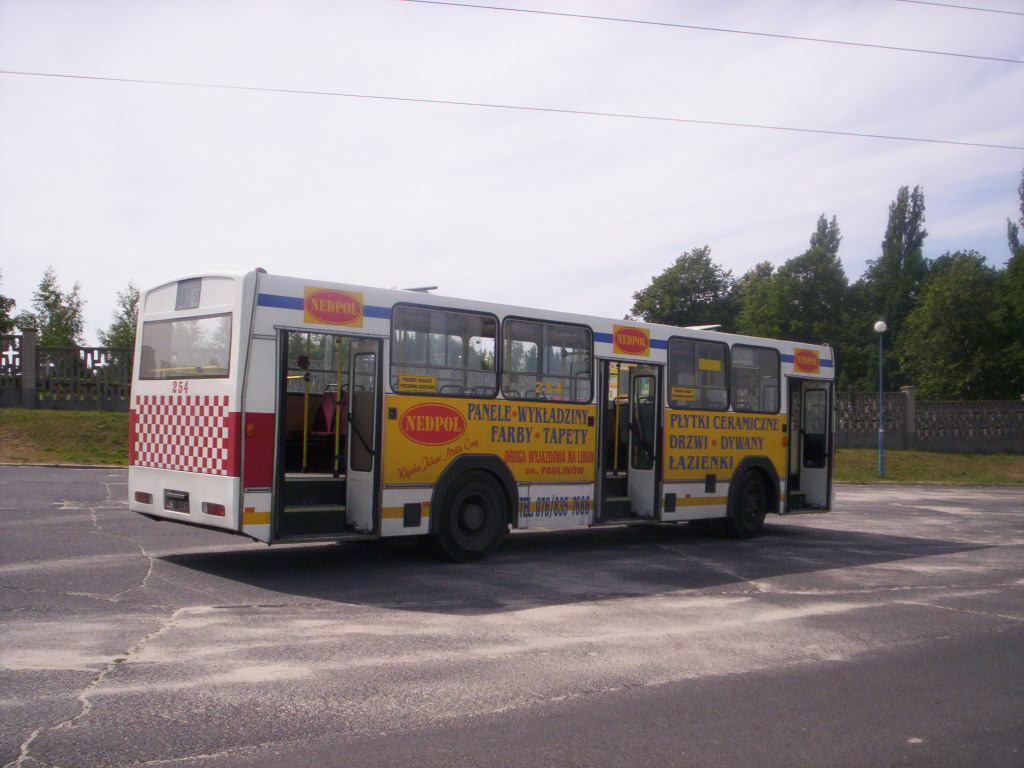
KM Głogów Jelcz M11 rear in Głogów, Poland in June 2005

Jelcz M11 buses were deployed to city transport operators across Poland, excluding Warsaw. In the 1990s, the M11 was introduced to Warsaw, where it was primarily used by private operators.

=== Modernization ===
In 1994, plans were made to adapt city buses to accommodate people with physical disabilities. Expert evaluations determined that the Jelcz M11 buses, along with Ikarus 260 and 280 buses, which were based on the same chassis, were unsuitable for retrofitting with elevators. Additionally, the high floor plate made the installation of folding ramps impractical. As a result, efforts shifted to designing new buses with low-floor configuration rather than modifying existing models.

== Construction ==
Throughout its six-year production run, the Jelcz M11 saw no significant changes.

=== Undercarriage ===
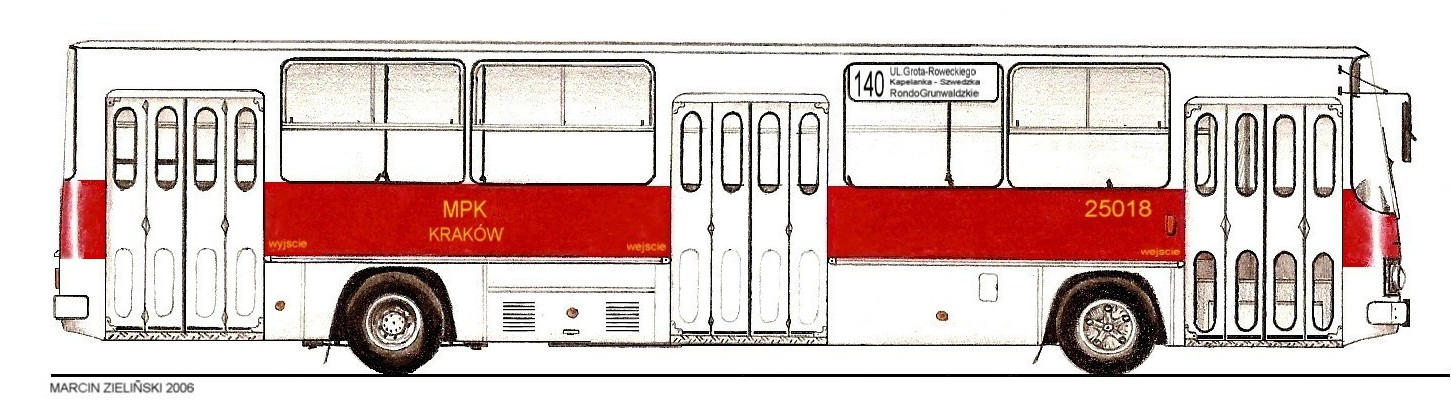
Ikarus 260

Jelcz M11 was equipped with the Hungarian Csepel 260.88 chassis, which was also used in the Ikarus 260 buses. It was characterized by a high, flat floor. While the chassis was responsible for most of the defects in the Jelcz M11, it allowed for the interchangeability of engine parts between the Jelcz M11 and the Ikarus 260 and 280.

==== Drivetrain ====
The bus was powered by a six-cylinder in-line diesel engine RABA-MAN D2156HM6U, with a displacement of 10,350 cm³ and a maximum power of 193 HP. This engine enabled the Jelcz M11 to achieve a top speed of 82 km/h, which was lower than that of the Ikarus 260. Unlike the Hungarian bus, Jelcz M11 was designed primarily as an urban vehicle. The engine was mounted horizontally in the middle of floor plate.

Power was transmitted through a 5-speed manual gearbox, the Csepel ASH 75.2. The power from the gearbox was conveyed via a driveshaft produced by Gewes to the rear axle, which was supplied by Raba. The Jelcz M11 used the Raba 118 rear axle, an upgrade from the axle used in the Ikarus 260.
