= Jelcz PR110D =

Polish-made coach and intercity bus

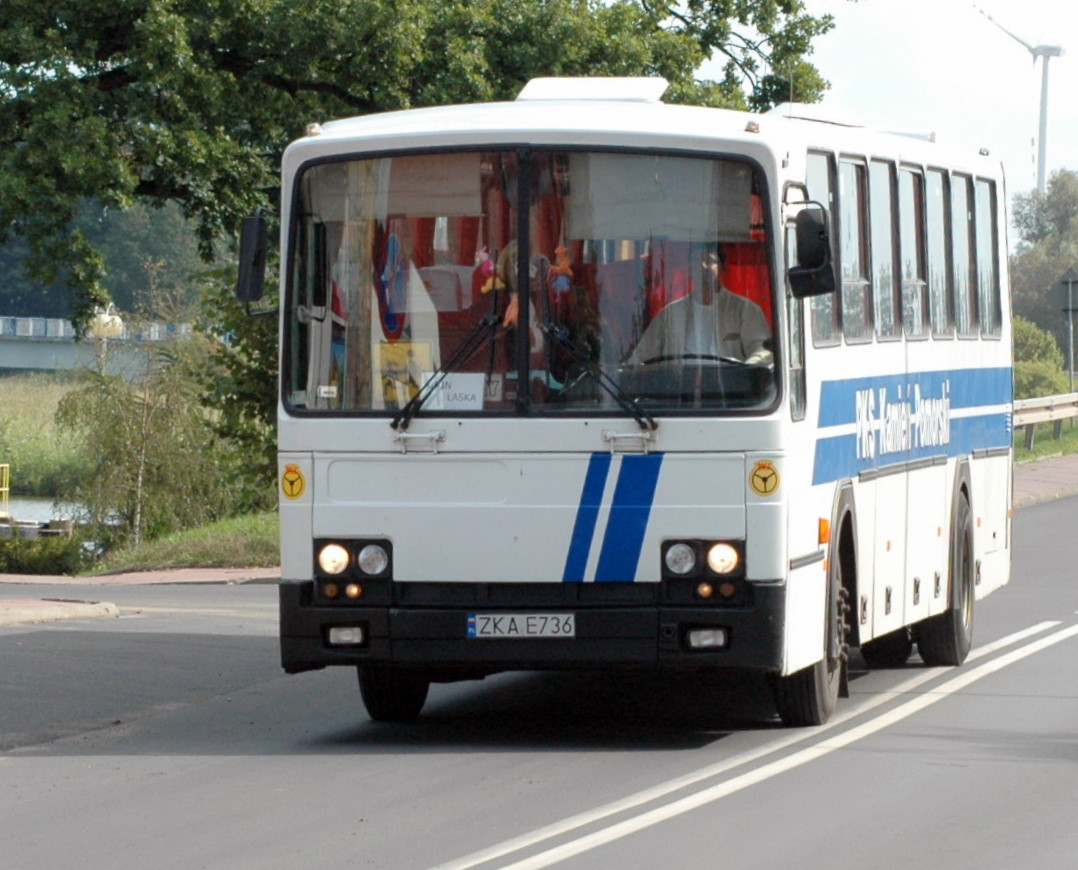

Overview
- Manufacturer: Jelcz
- Production: 1984-1992
- Assembly: Jelcz-Laskowice, Poland

Body and chassis
- Class: Intercity bus/Coach
- Doors: 2 doors
- Floor type: Step-entrance; Low floor

Powertrain
- Engine: WS Mielec SW680/165
- Capacity: 51 (Standard); 46 (Lux)
- Power output: 202 HP
- Transmission: S6-90

Dimensions
- Length: 12000 mm
- Width: 2500 mm
- Height: 3180 mm
- Curb weight: 16000 kg

Chronology
- Successor: Jelcz D120

The Jelcz PR110D is a coach and intercity bus produced by the Polish company Jelcz in Jelcz-Laskowice near Oława in Poland in 1984–1992.

== History of the model in Poland ==
The predecessor of Jelcz PR110D bus was a French Berliet PR110 TOURISME (1977). The bus was built on its basis in 1984 with several units of the bus named Jelcz PR110D. The letter D means long-distance.

== Specification ==
The engine was a Mielec SW680 / 164. Initially, it reached 186 horsepower power, however, since 1988 the engine had the power of 202 HP and with the marking SW680 / 165. The mechanical gearbox, which was used, wore the designation S6-90 and had 6 gears. The bus steering mechanism had a ballscrew hydraulic power of type 8065. Jelcz also had a dual-circuit brake that worked on the front axle and rear axle; the emergency brake and parking brake were pneumatic, working in the rear axle. The engine brake was activated pneumatically by cutting off the fuel injection and exhaust flow throttling. Lowering the front wall of the cab resulted in lower drag, and better handling on the road. Under the floor of the bus there is an extensive baggage compartment with a capacity of 6m^{3} and fuel tank with the capacity to have 250 litres. Jelcz PR110D was 12000 mm long, 2500 mm wide and 3180 mm high.
