= Jelcz =

Polish vehicle manufacturer

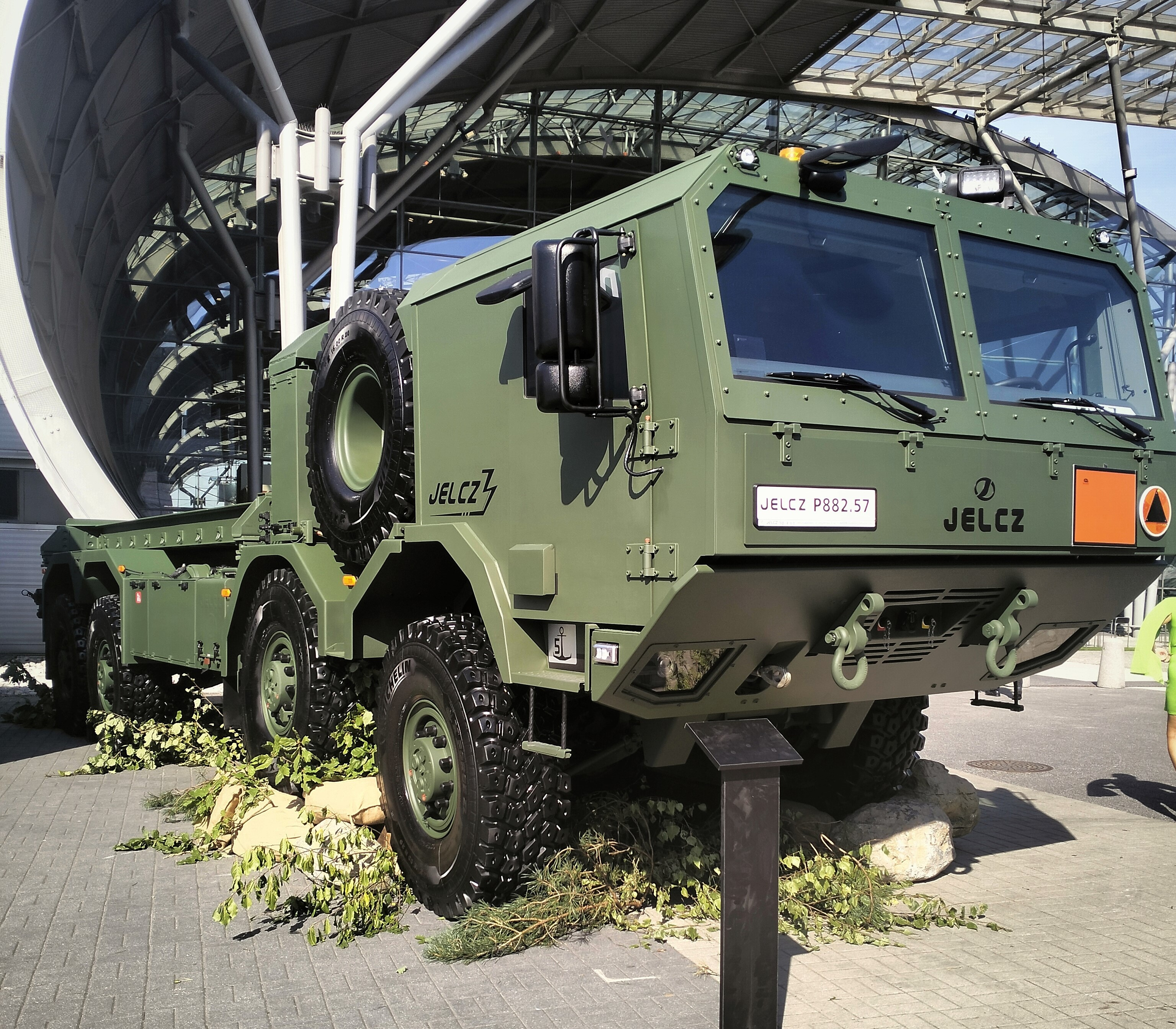
- Type: Spółka z ograniczoną odpowiedzialnością
- Industry: automotive, defence
- Founded: 28 March 1952 (2014 Jelcz Sp. z o.o.)
- Headquarters: Jelcz-Laskowice, Poland
- Key people: Władysław Czubak CEO
- Products: trucks
- Number of employees: 600 (2021)
- Website: www.jelcz.com.pl

Jelcz (Note: Polish pronunciation: [jɛlt͡ʂ]) is a Polish manufacturer of trucks, buses, trolleybuses and different types of dedicated chassis.

Since 2013, the company has been part of the Polska Grupa Zbrojeniowa and focuses on manufacturing off-road military vehicles.

== History ==
In 1952, a decision was made to use a former German armaments factory in Jelcz-Laskowice near Wrocław for production in western Poland. A company called Zakłady Budowy Nadwozi Samochodowych (Automobile Chassis Works) was established. After the factory was rebuilt, the company started to develop and build bus bodies for Lublin and Star trucks, including buses such as the Jelcz PR110D.

In 1974, the Polish expedition to Lhotse used a Jelcz 316 car to travel from Warsaw to Nepal. In 1975, the expedition of the Wrocław Mountain Club to Broad Peak Central, in Pakistan, used a Jelcz 315-M car to travel from Wrocław to Islamabad, driving up to 9,000 km between 2 and 21 May.

Since 2004, Jelcz Sp. z o.o. has concentrated on producing military trucks, mainly for the Polish Armed Forces (for example, the WR-40 Langusta MLRS).

Since 2012, the sole owner of Jelcz sp. z o.o. has been Huta Stalowa Wola, which is a part of the Polska Grupa Zbrojeniowa.

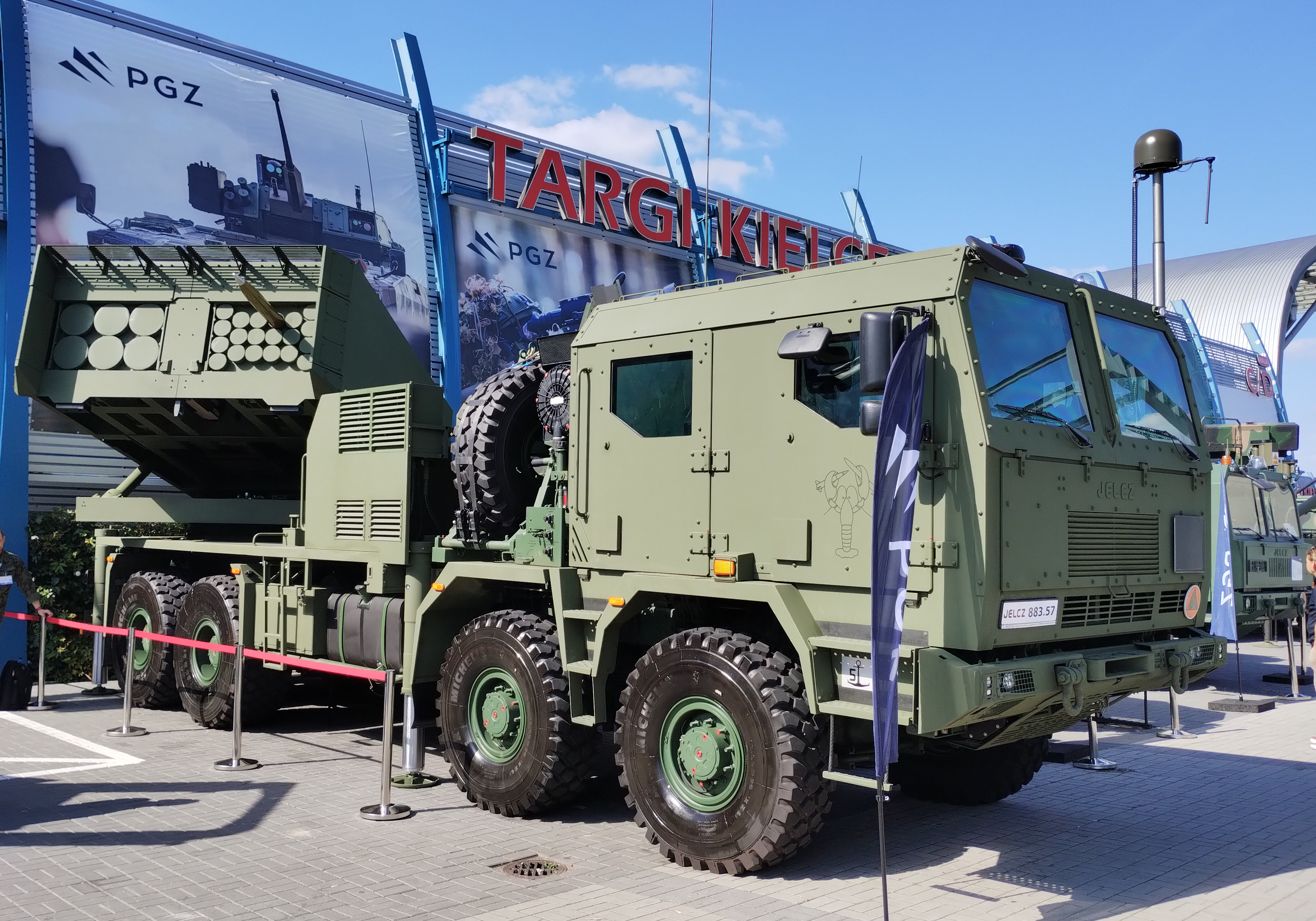
Homar-K prototype on Jelcz P882.57 chassis

In 2023, the Jelcz P882.57 8x8 chassis was selected as the base chassis in the Polish Homar-K multiple launch rocket system program. The vehicle has been integrated with the TOPAZ combat management system, the Fonet digital vehicle communication platform, the Radmor radio communication system and the K239 rocket launcher module.

At the MSPO military fair in 2023, the company presented the advanced third-generation P883.57 chassis for the first time, which is dedicated to the future standard chassis in the Polish Armed Forces.

== Gallery ==
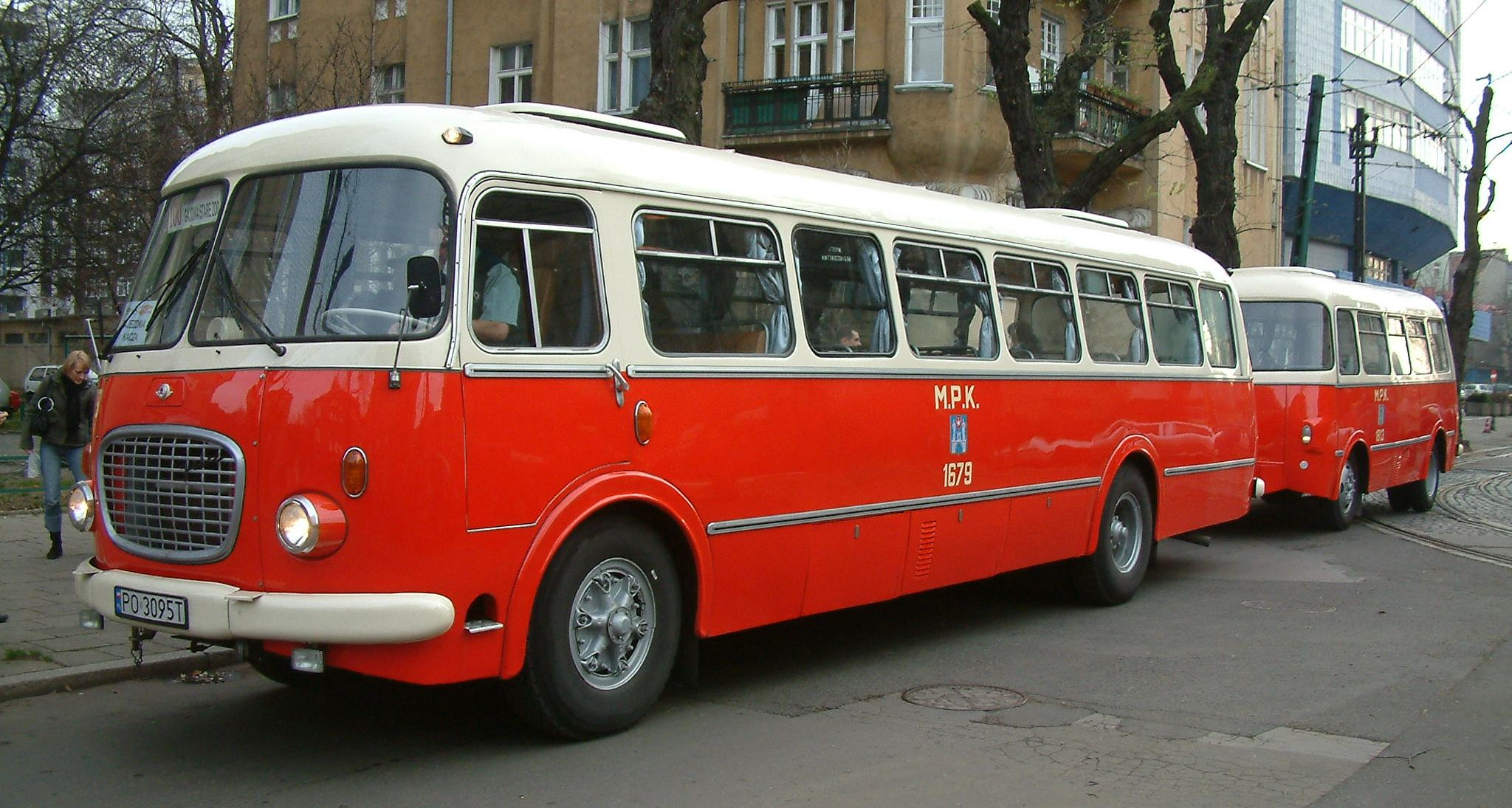
Jelcz 043 and Jelcz P01

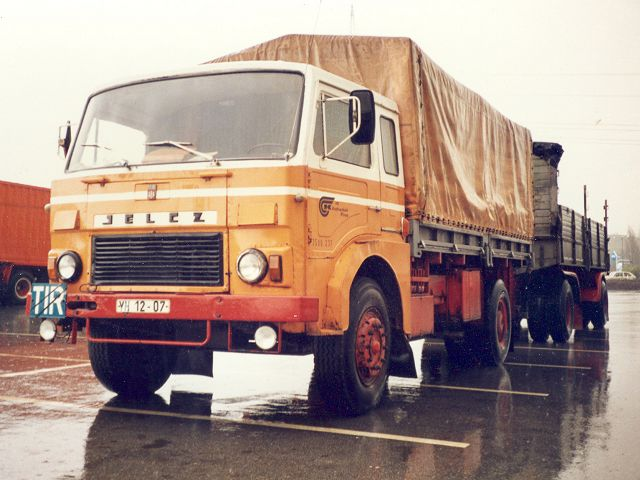
Jelcz 315

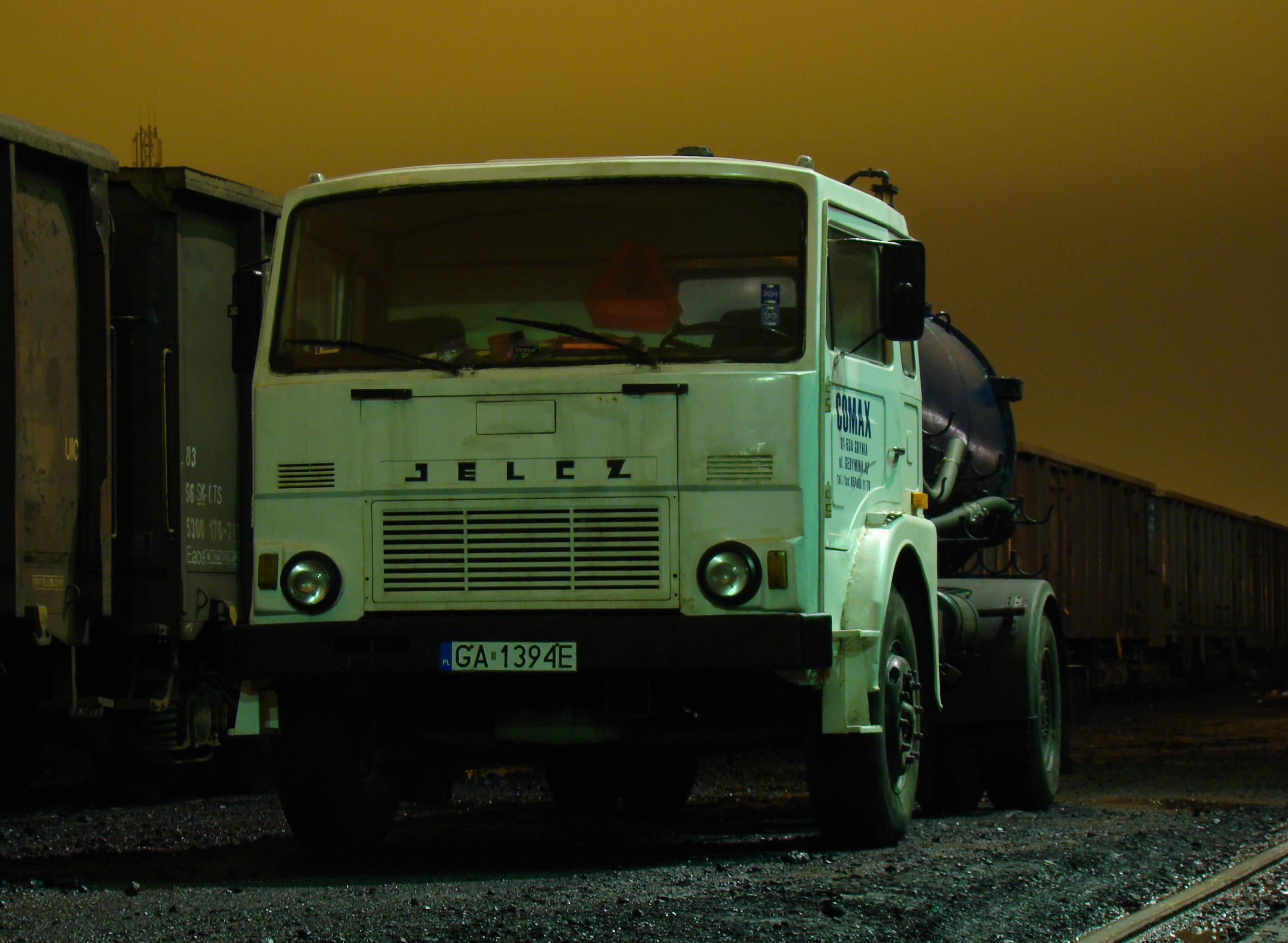
Jelcz 325

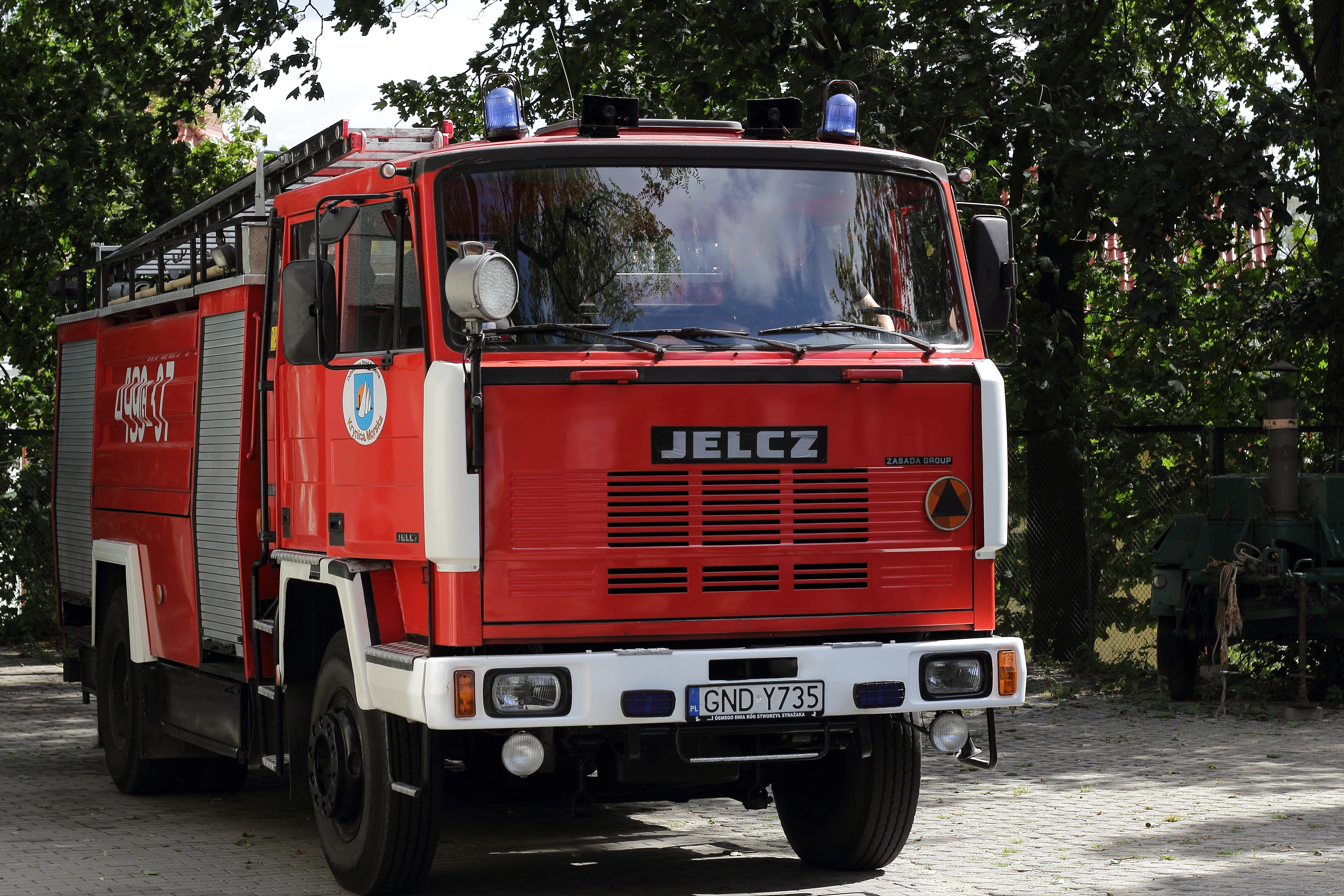
Jelcz P422

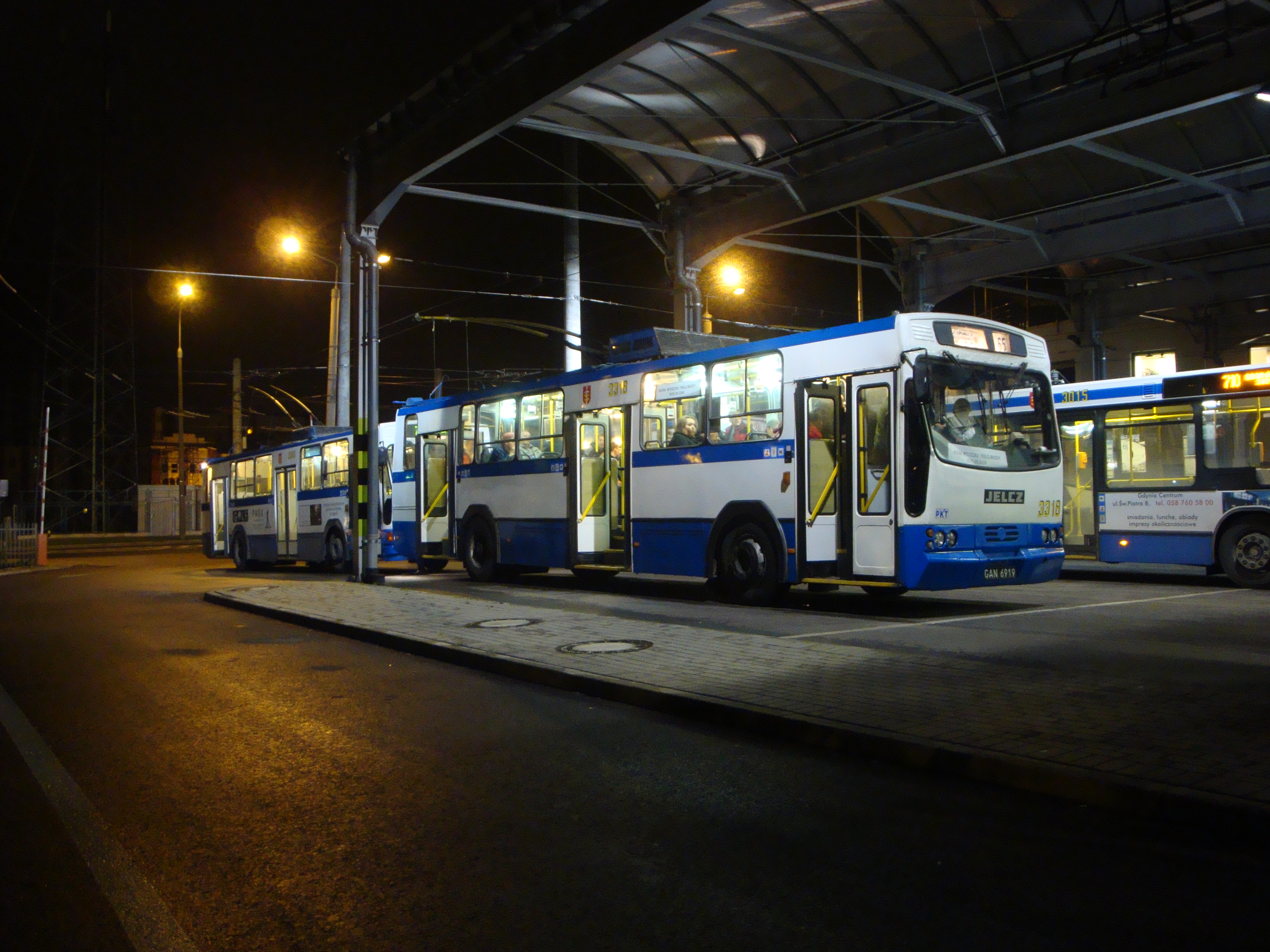
Jelcz 120ME

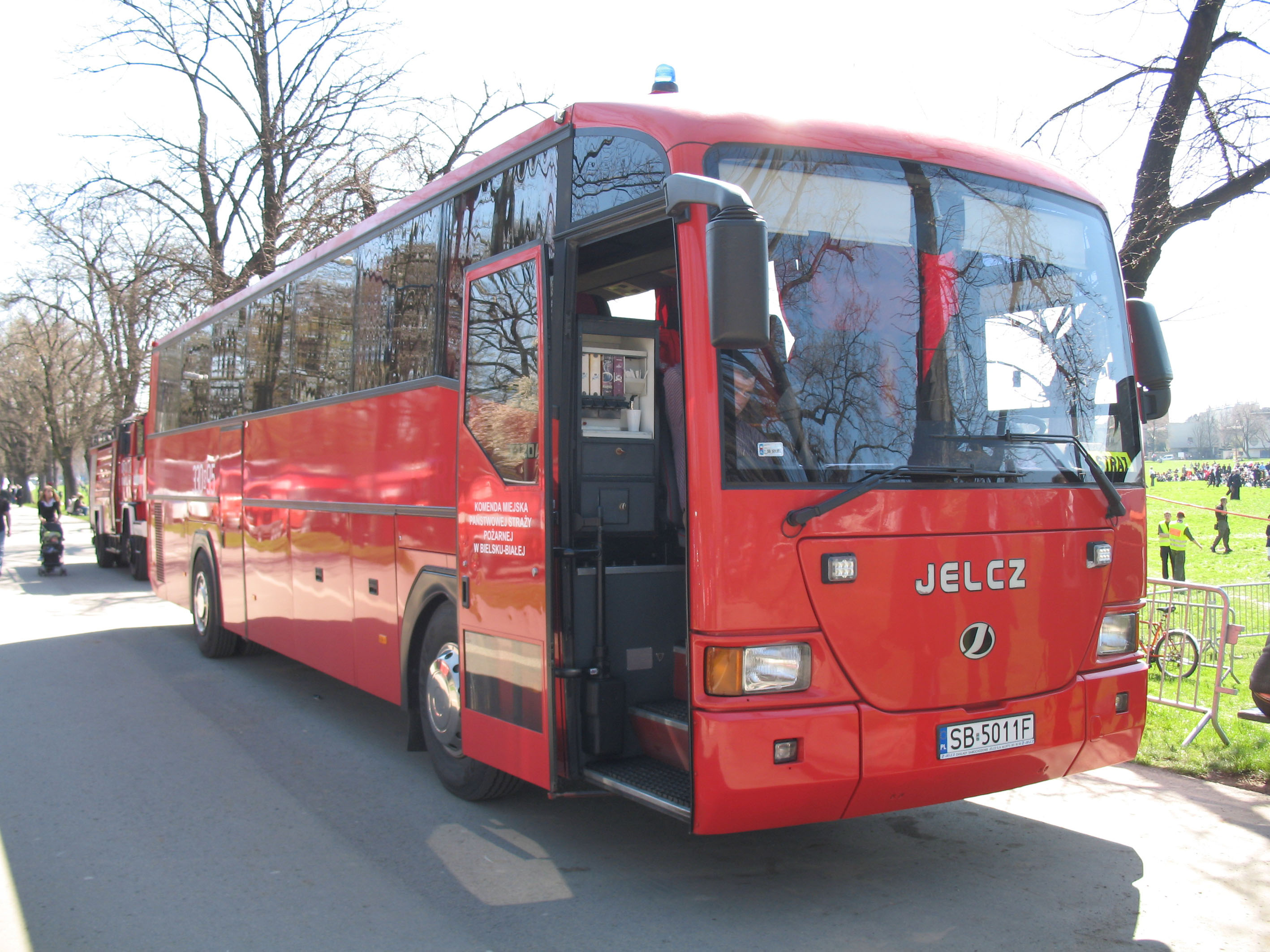
Jelcz T120-2

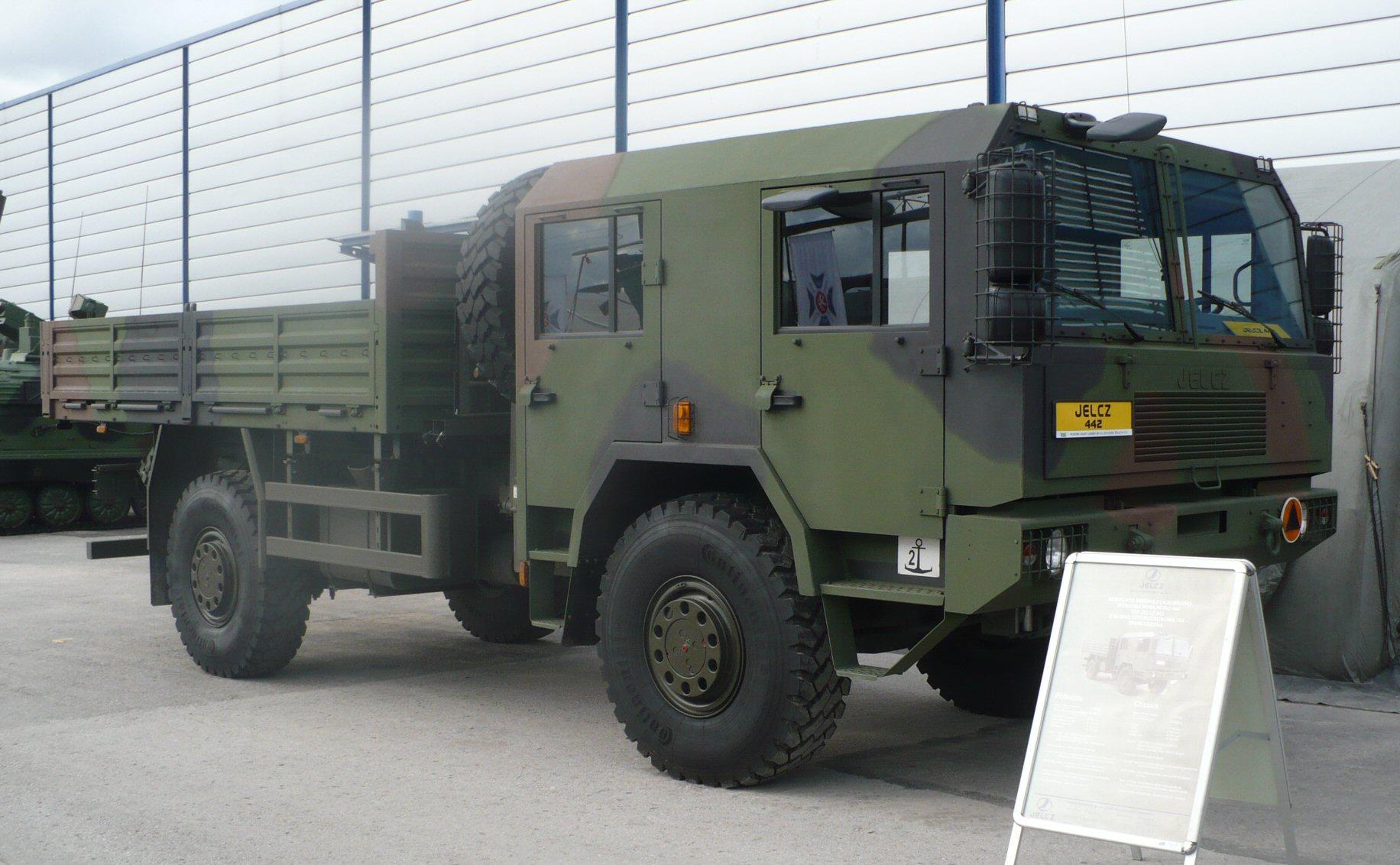
Jelcz S442.D28

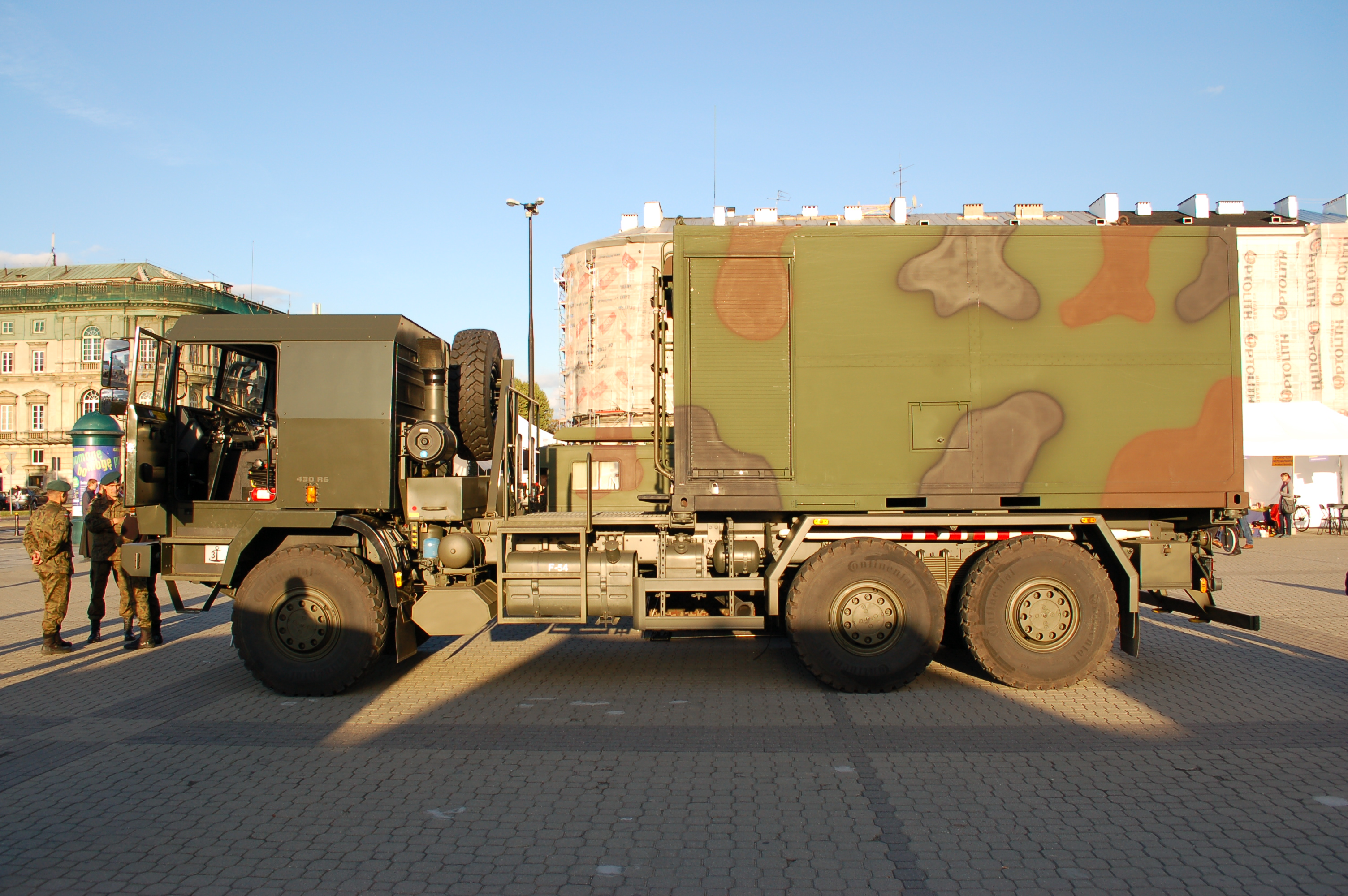
Jelcz P662 "Jaśmin"

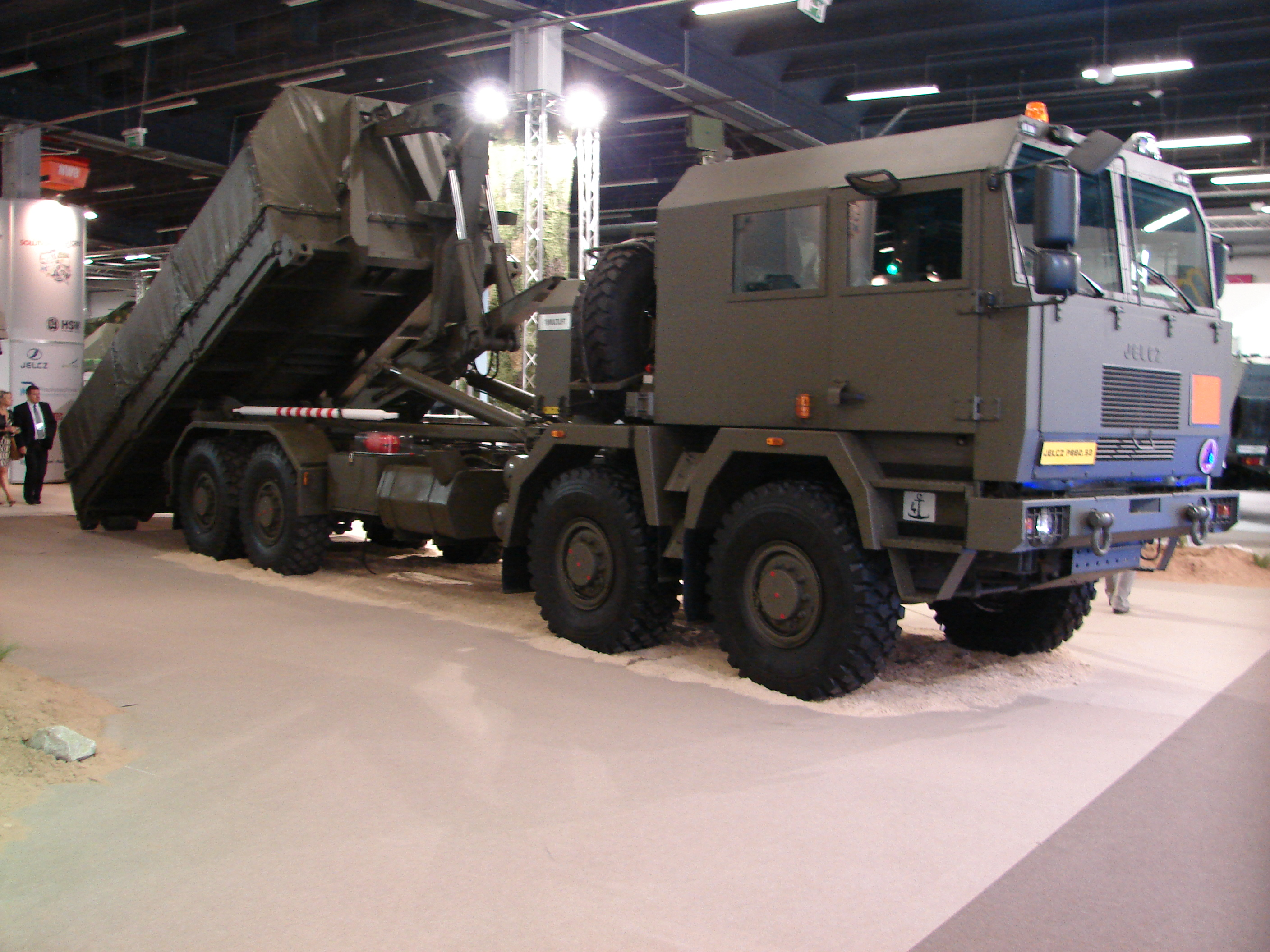
Jelcz P882.D53

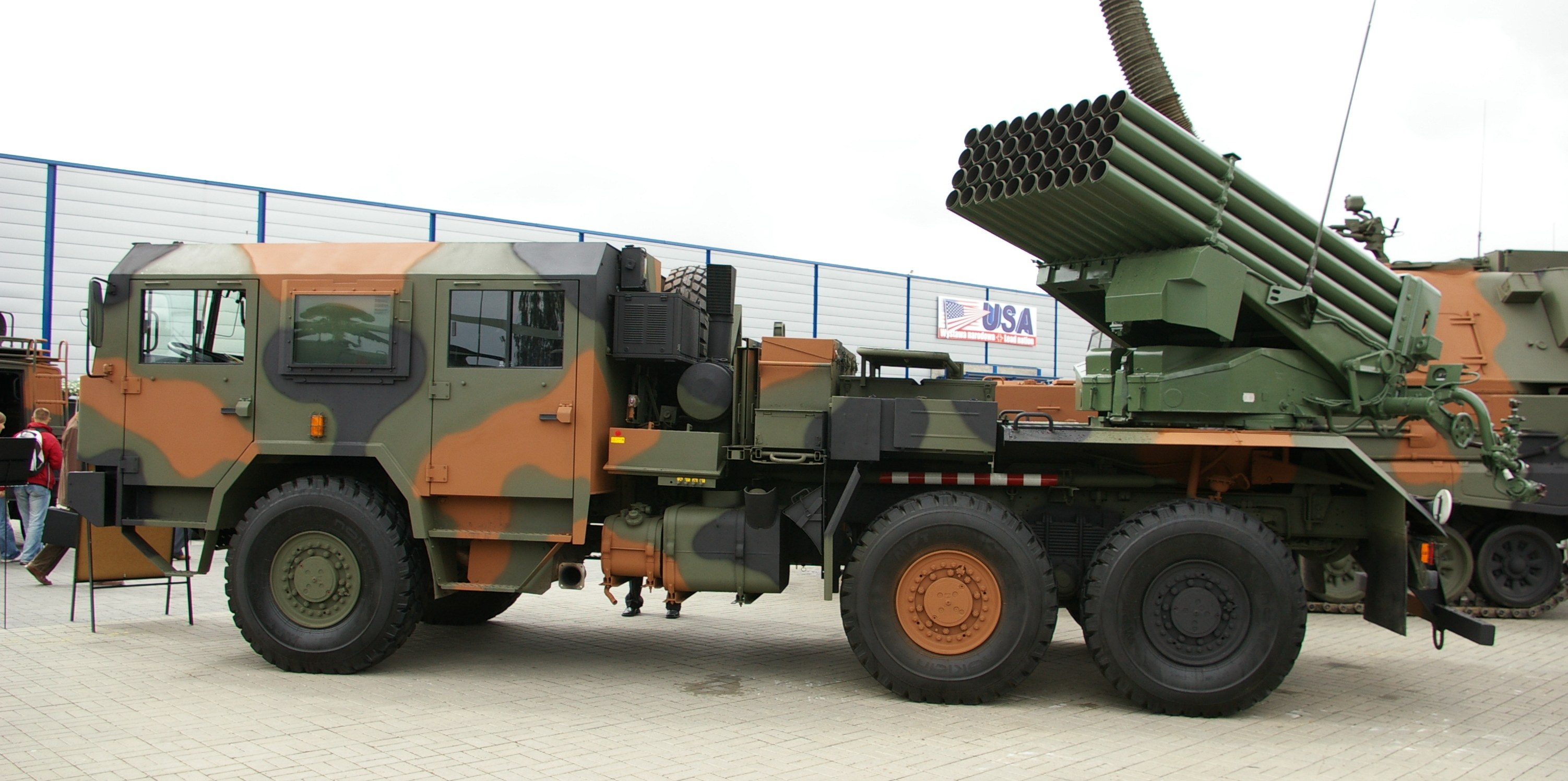
WR-40 Langusta on Jelcz P662.D35

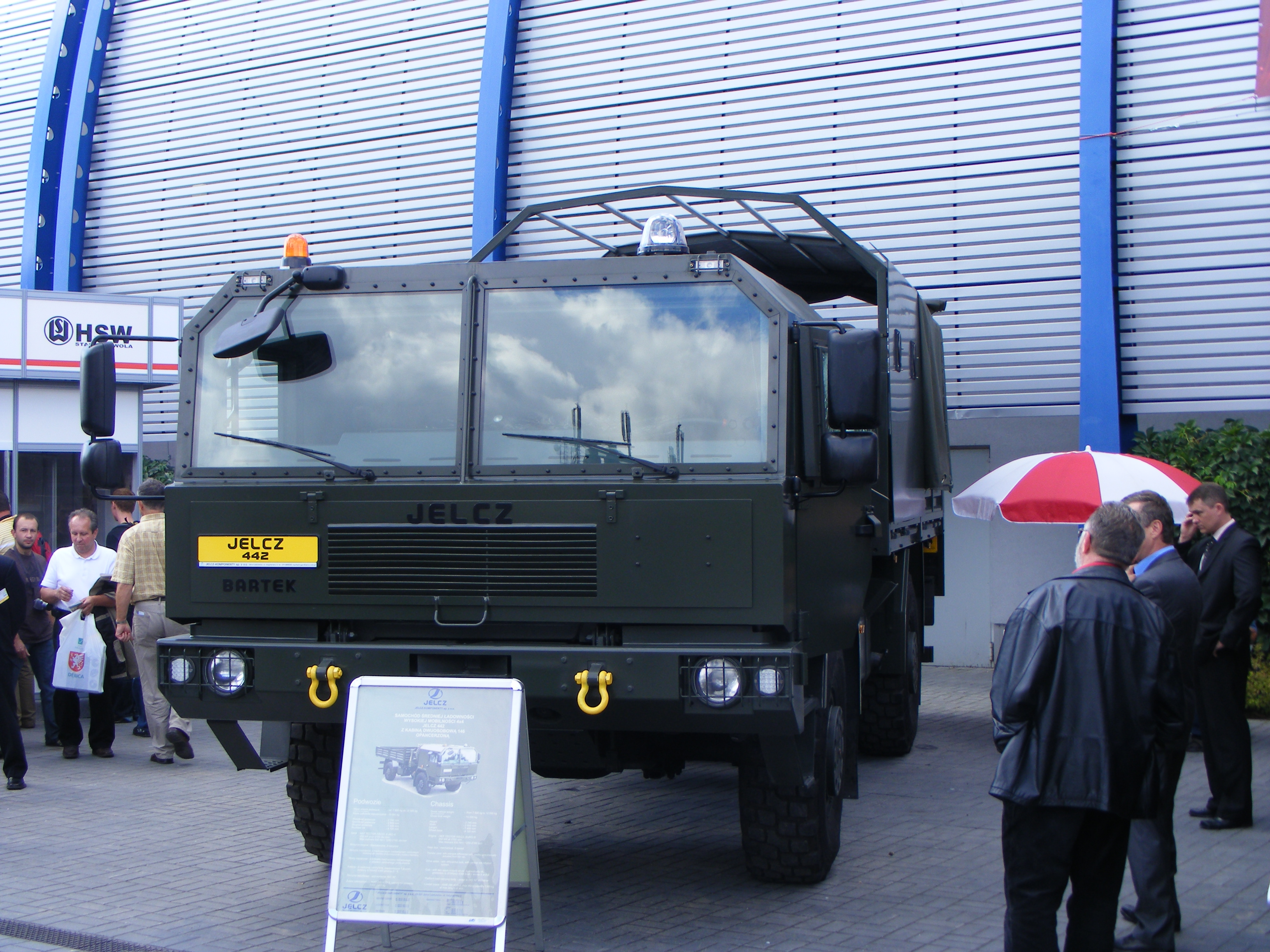
Jelcz P442.28 "Bartek"

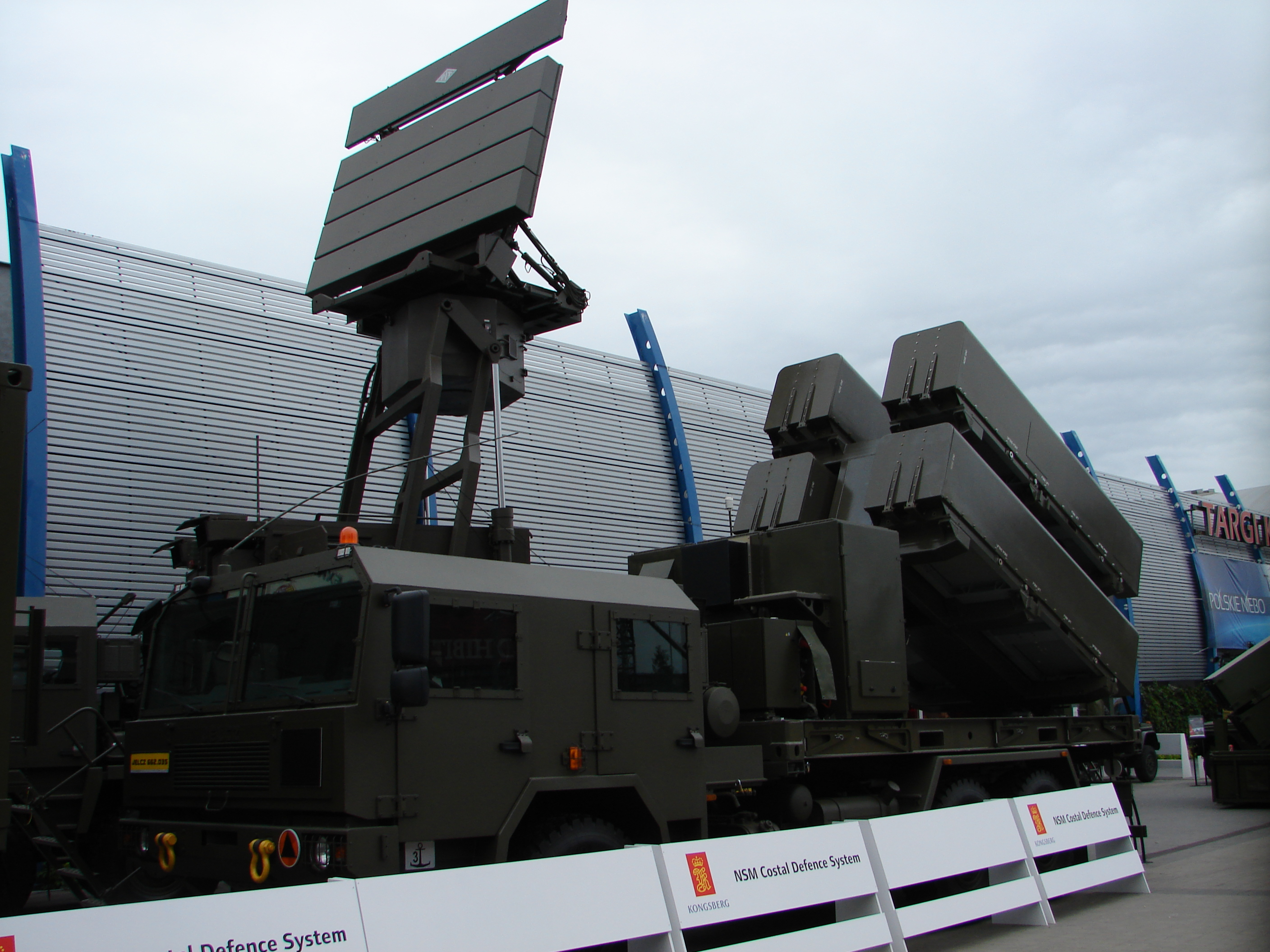
Jelcz P662.D43

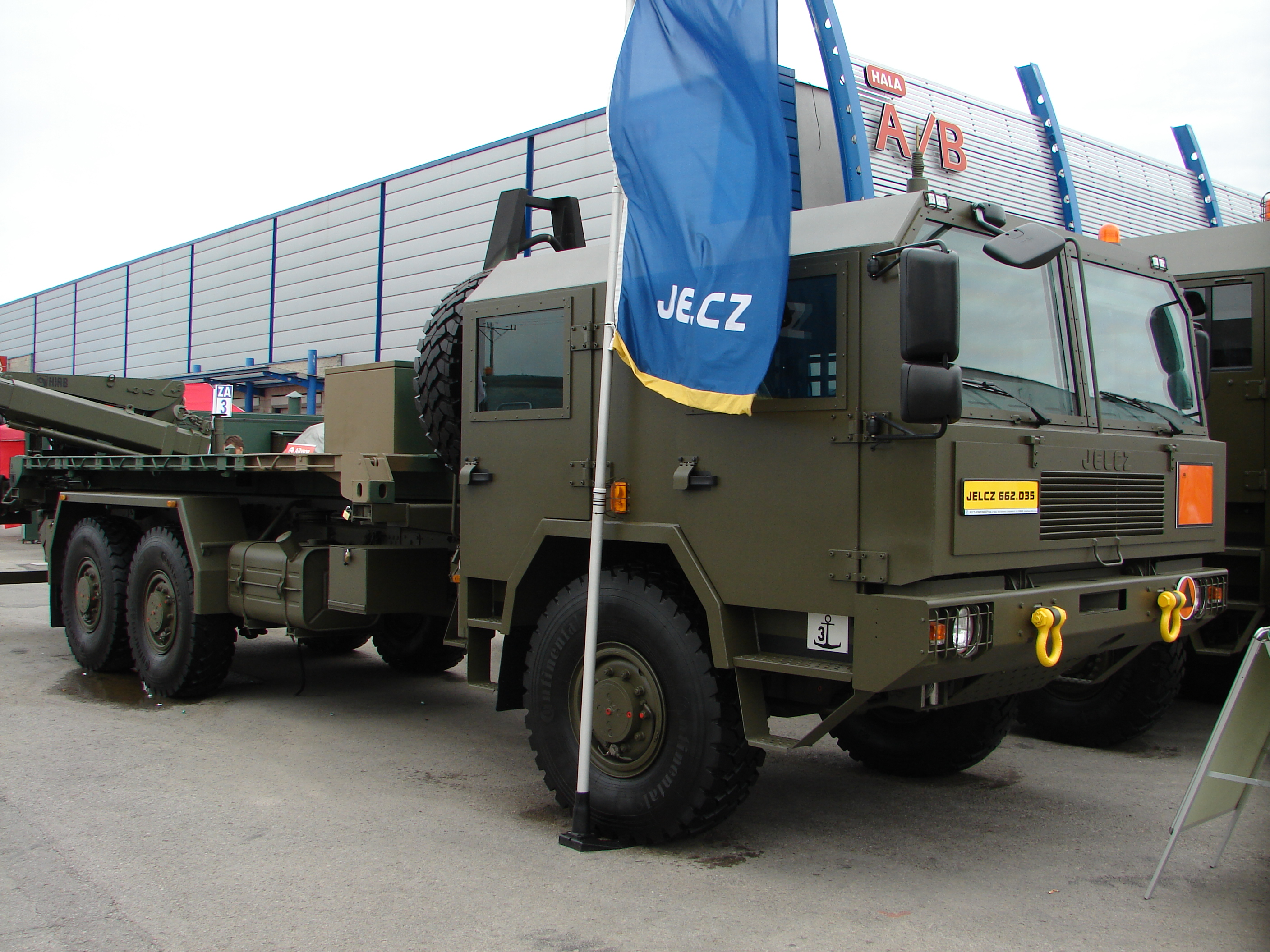
Jelcz P662.D35

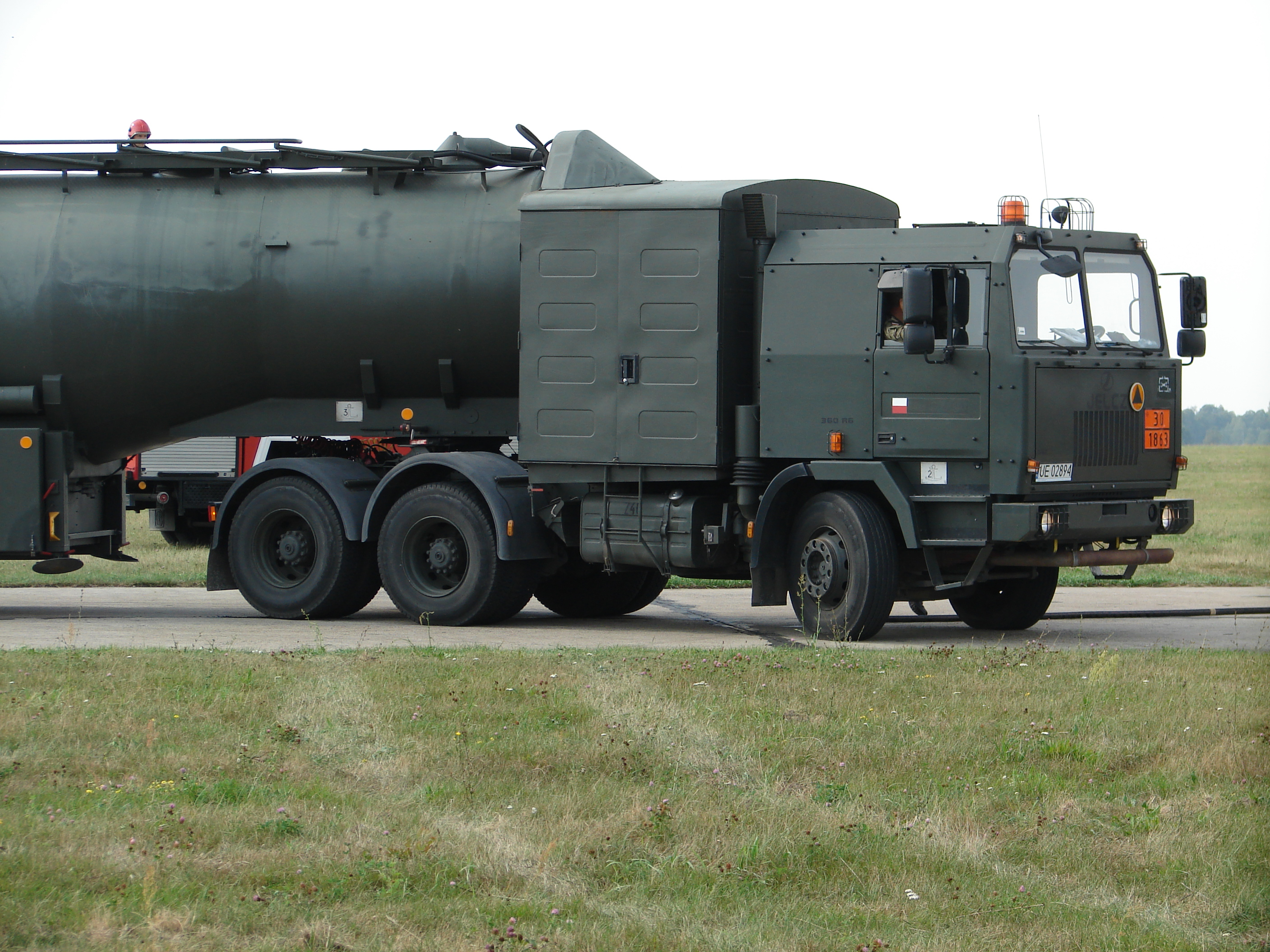
Jelcz C642.D43

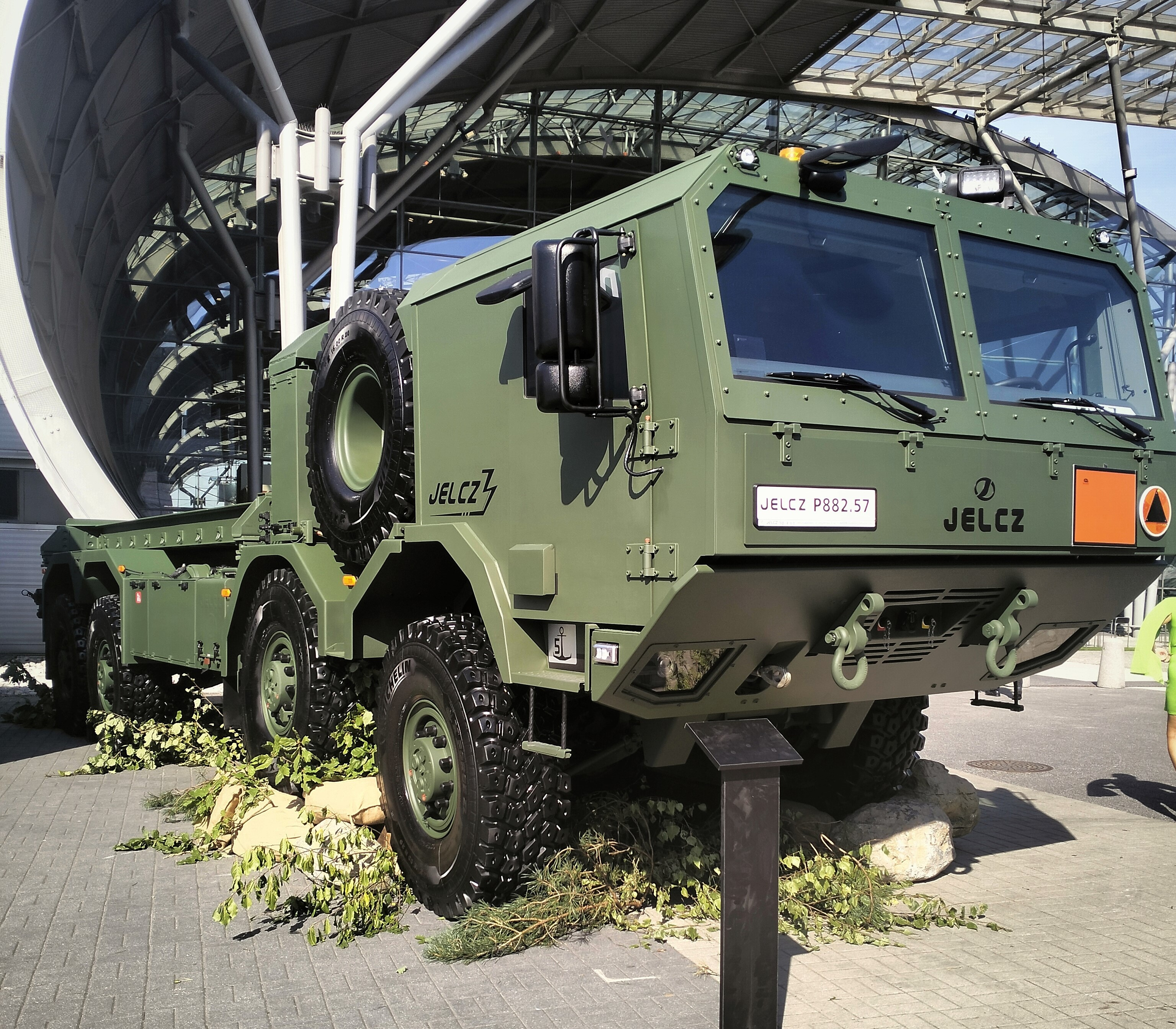
Jelcz 883.57

Jelcz M121I

Jelcz M121M

Jelcz M181MB Tantus

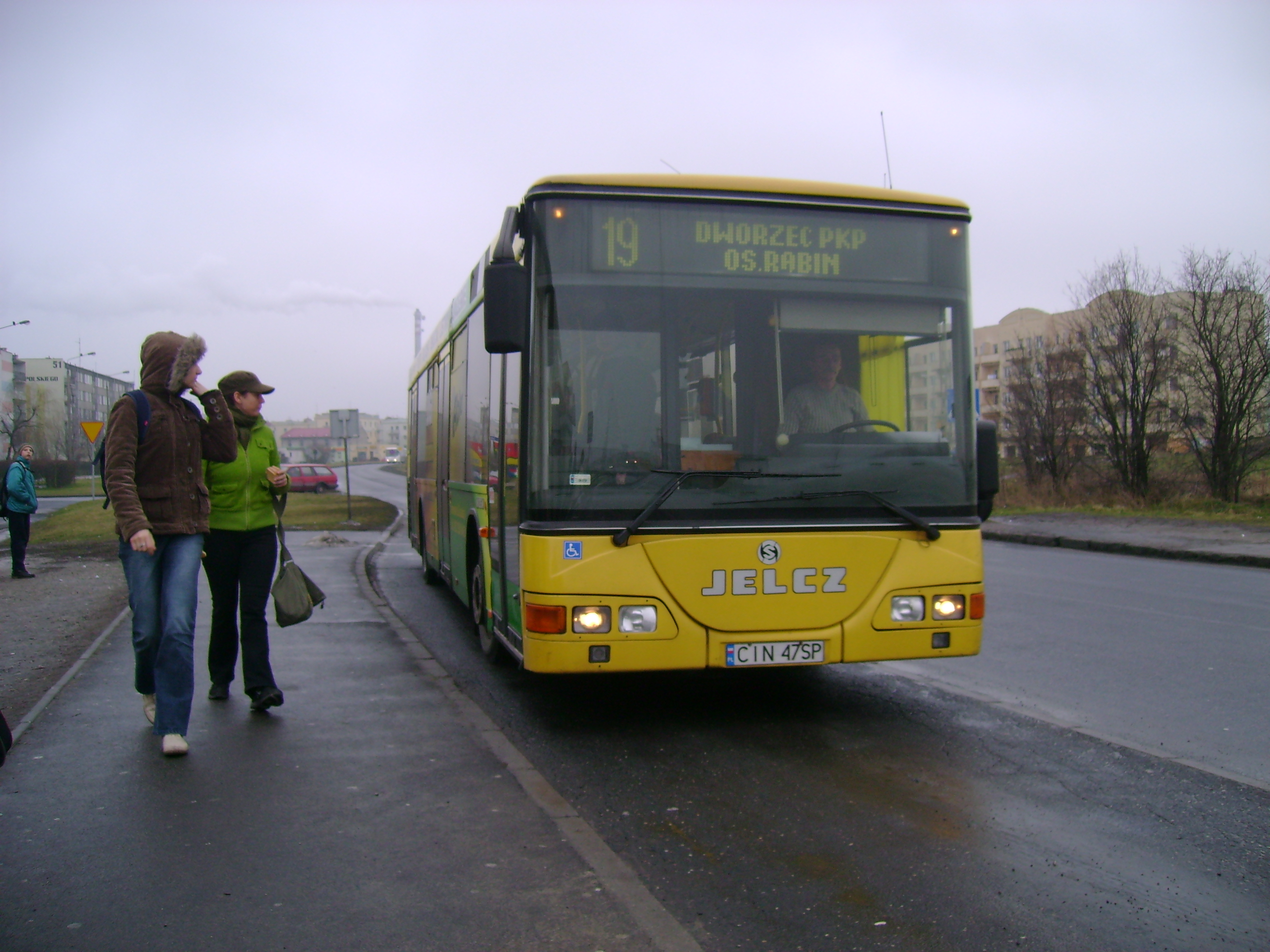
Jelcz M125M Dana

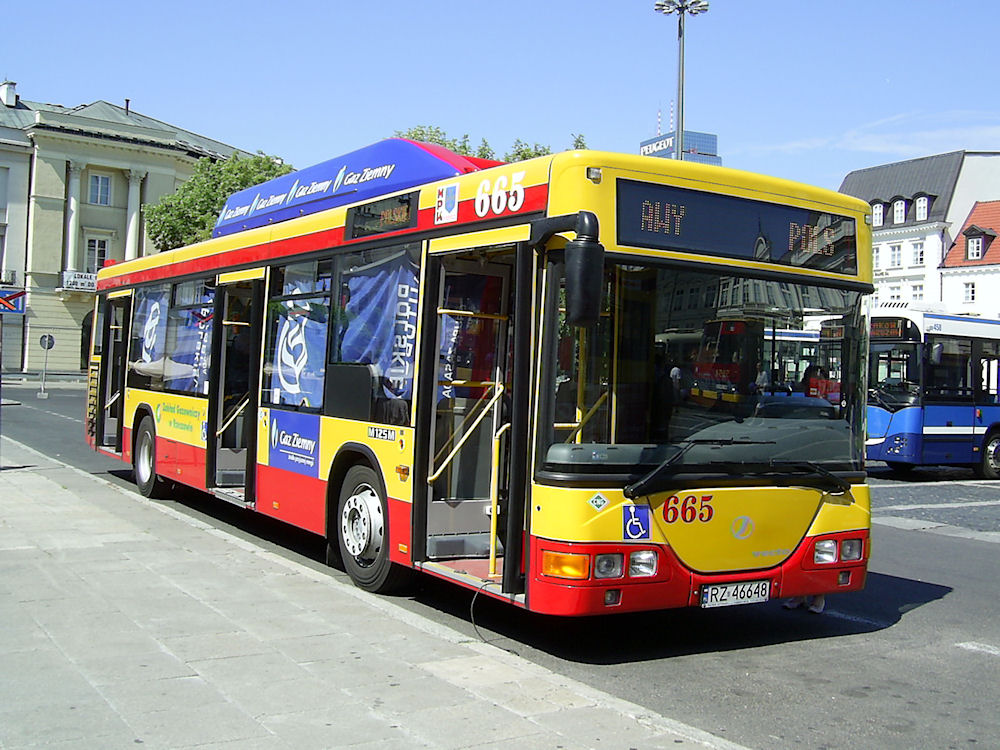
Jelcz M125M CNG

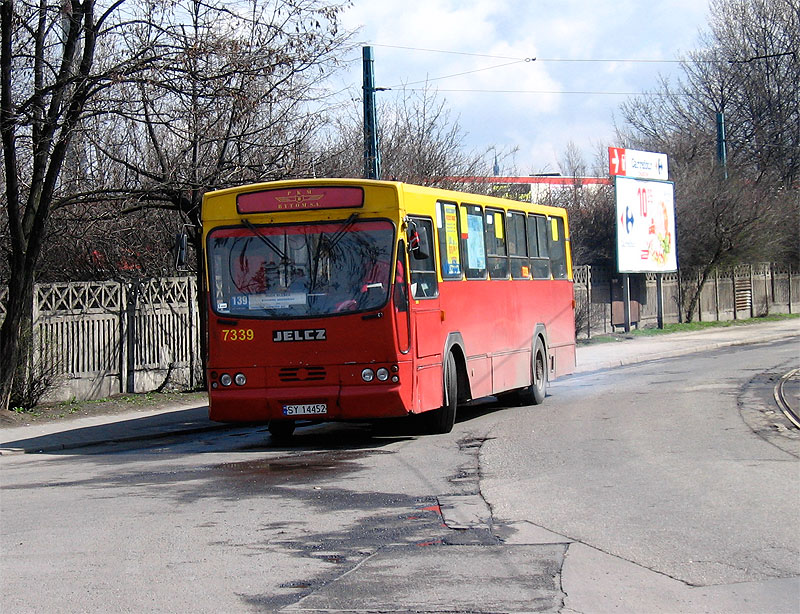
Jelcz M11

== See also ==
- Jelcz M11
- Jelcz PR110
- Jelcz M125M
