= Jelcz PR110 =

Jelcz-Berliet PR110U (1975-1983) Jelcz PR110M (1983-1992)
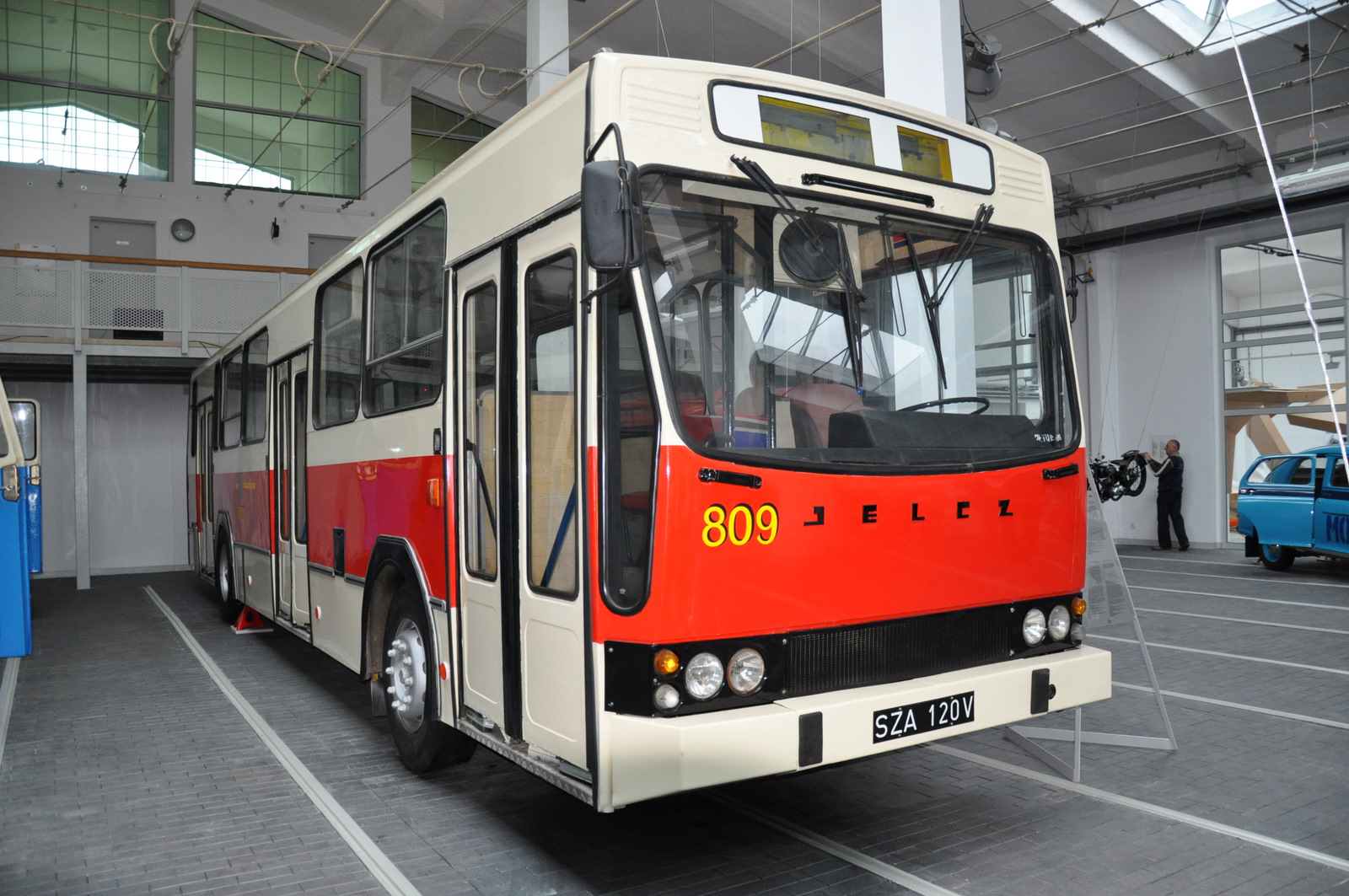

Overview
- Manufacturer: Jelczańskie Zakłady Samochodowe
- Production: 1975-1992
- Assembly: Poland, Jelcz-Laskowice

Body and chassis
- Class: Commercial vehicle
- Body style: Full size high-floor bus
- Related: Berliet PR100

Powertrain
- Engine: WS Mielec SW/680/56/3 (till 1978); WS Mielec SW680/78/1 (since 1978)
- Transmission: FPS Tczew S4-95

Dimensions
- Wheelbase: 6.1 m
- Length: 12.000 m
- Width: 2.5 m
- Height: 3.04 m
- Curb weight: 17,280 kg

Chronology
- Predecessor: Jelcz PR100
- Successor: Jelcz 120M

The Jelcz PR110 was a Polish full-size high-floor city bus, manufactured between 1975 and 1992 by Jelczańskie Zakłady Samochodowe in Jelcz-Laskowice, licensed by the French Berliet. It was successor of Jelcz PR100. The main differences between PR100 and PR110 was new transmission, a third door pair in PR110 and more Polish parts used in PR110 than in its predecessor.

The bus was designed for city public transport.

Jelcz PR110 was produced on French license with name PR110U till 1983, when the license expired. Since 1983 bus has been produced with new name, PR110M, but with no important changes.

From 1976 to 1992, approximately 12,000 models of PR110 were produced.

== See also ==
- Jelcz
- Jelcz M11
