= Jelcz-Laskowice =

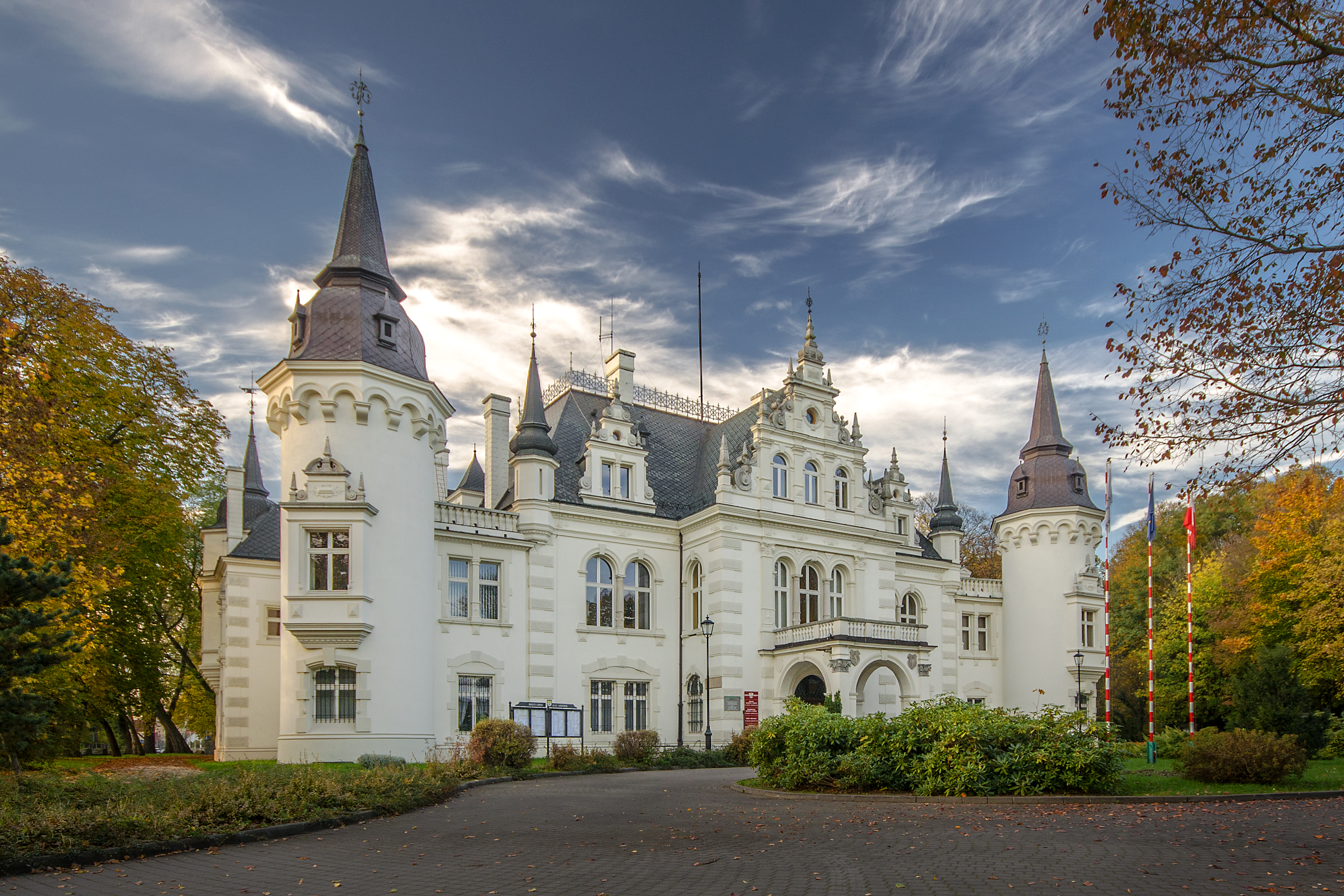
- Laskowice Oławskie Palace, now city council

- Coat of arms

- Location within Poland
- Coordinates: 51°2′N 17°20′E
- Country: Poland
- Voivodeship: Lower Silesian
- County: Oława
- Gmina: Jelcz-Laskowice
- Town rights: 1987

Area
  - Total: 17.06 km^{2} (6.59 sq mi)

Population (2019-06-30)
  - Total: 15,803
  - Density: 926.3/km^{2} (2,399/sq mi)
- Time zone: UTC+1 (CET)
  - Summer (DST): UTC+2 (CEST)
- Postal code: 55-221 or 55-220
- Website: http://www.jelcz-laskowice.pl/

Jelcz-Laskowice ([ˈjɛlt͡ʂ laskɔˈvʲit͡sɛ]) is a town in Oława County, Lower Silesian Voivodeship, in south-western Poland. As of 2019, the town has a population of 15,803.

== History ==
The town was created on January 1, 1987, as a union of the former municipalities of Jelcz (German: Jeltsch) and Laskowice (Laskowitz). It was best known for its large bus factory, owned by the company Jelcz S.A., though since the bankruptcy of that company the largest employers have been Toyota and the Mechanical Institute.

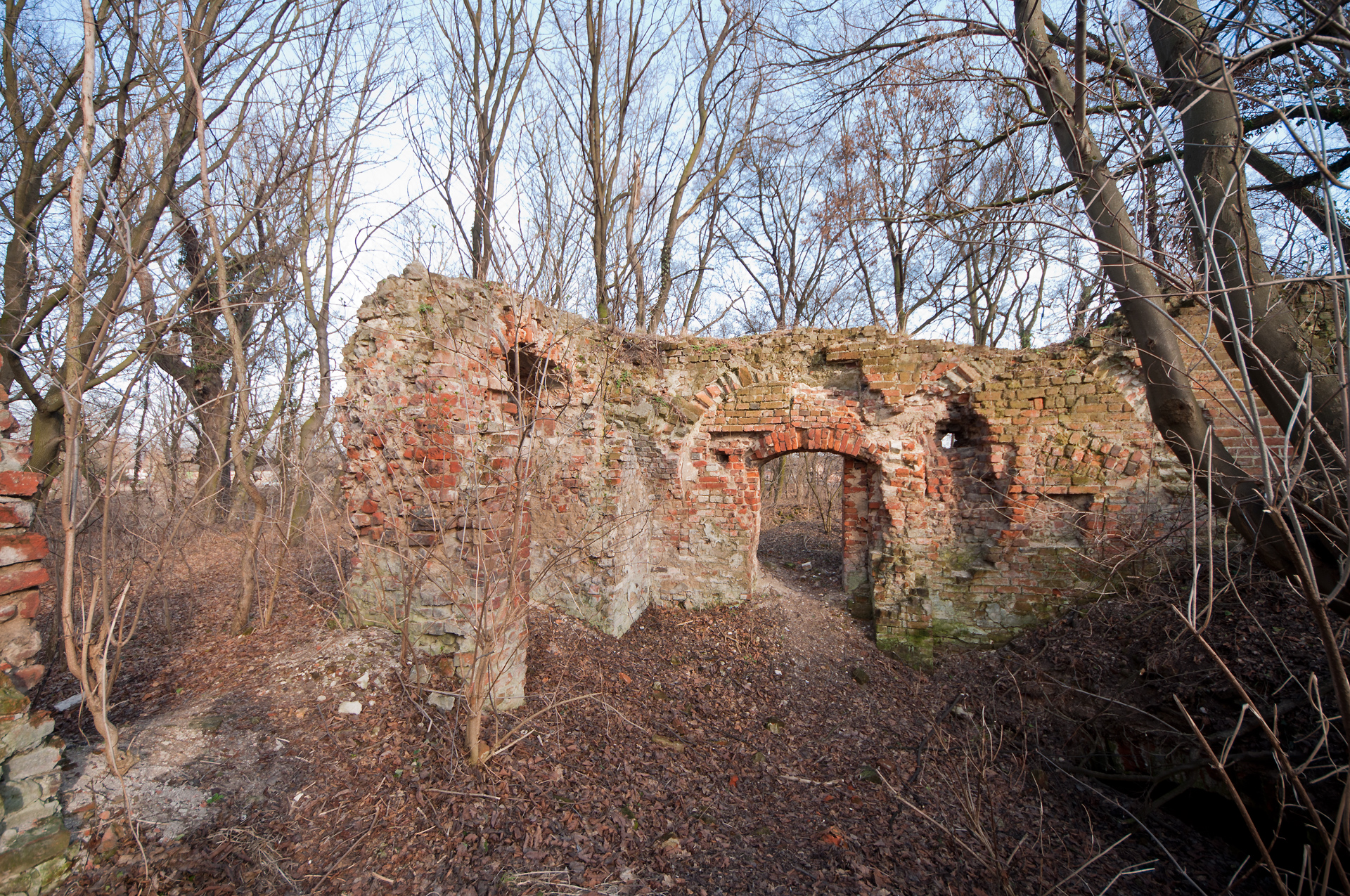
Ruins of the medieval castle

The oldest traces of human settlement in present-day Jelcz-Laskowice date back to the Neolithic period.

In the Middle Ages both Jelcz and Laskowice were part of the Kingdom of Poland ruled by the Piast dynasty. The first known mentions of both villages come from the 13th century, although they probably already existed in the 12th century. Laskowice was first mentioned in 1203, when it was granted by Duke Henry the Bearded to Polish noble Leonard Włostowic, the grandson of Piotr Włostowic. Jelcz was first mentioned as Jalche in a 1245 deed, when Pope Innocent IV assigned it to the Archdiocese of Wrocław. In 1277 Duke Bolesław II the Bald of Legnica here captured and arrested his nephew Duke Henryk IV Probus of Wrocław. Bolesław's grandson, Duke Bolesław III the Generous had a castle erected on an island in the Oder river about 1331. The village of Laskowice, on the other hand, was reestablished in 1293 in a slightly different location by Duke Henry V.

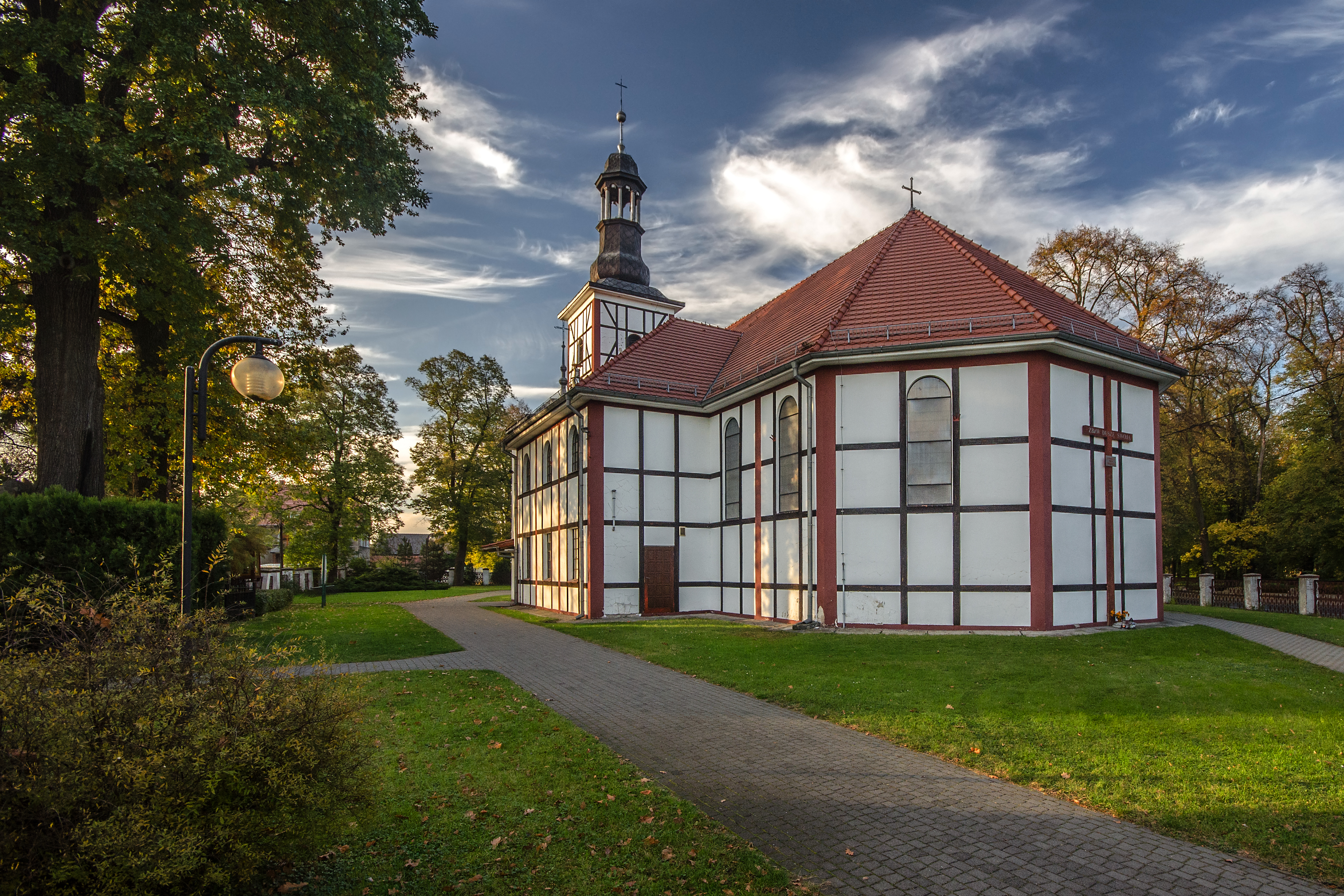
Baroque Saint Stanislaus church

From 1871 to 1945 the area was part of Germany, and between 1943 and 1945, during World War II, the nearby hamlet of Miłoszyce was the site of the Fünfteichen subcamp of the Nazi German Gross-Rosen concentration camp, where forced labourers built 145 mm (6 in) howitzers for the Berthawerke, a branch of the German Krupp company. Testing grounds still feature concrete installations 2 km (1.2 miles) east of the village of Nowy Dwór. Howitzers were hauled on rails from the branch Berthakrupp via Laskowice, Piekary and north of Nowy Dwór. Since 1945 Soviets sent over 160 railway sorties, presumably to Smolensk leaving very little behind them.

In 1945 the area according to the results of the Potsdam Conference became again part of Poland. In 1949 Polish Ministry of Defense began the production of Mobile Repair Vehicles and Ambulances for military purpose. Bus production by Jelcz S.A. started in 1952.

== Transport ==
The town is served by Jelcz-Laskowice railway station, which is seen by regional Lower Silesian Railways trains.

== Sports ==
Since 2015 a futsal club Orzeł Futsal Jelcz-Laskowice Sport Club created from initiative of Futsal Lovers from Wrocław and surroundings, has the headquarter in Centrum of Sport and Recreation (CSIR) in Jelcz-Laskowice and arrives in the first division of Polish Futsal League.

== Twin towns – sister cities ==
See twin towns of Gmina Jelcz-Laskowice.
