= Autosan H7 =

Series of buses

Autosan H7-10 Autosan H7-20
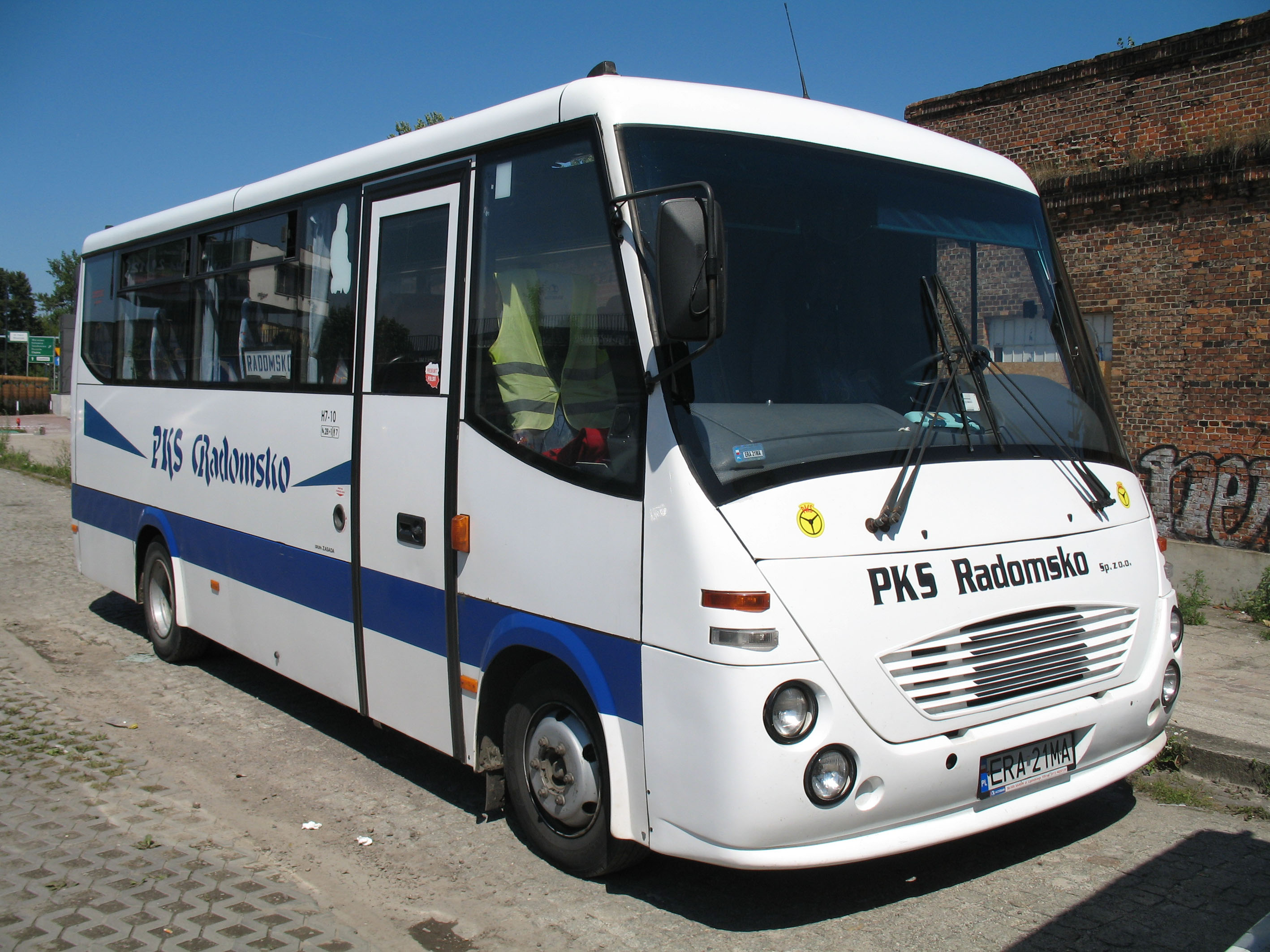
- Autosan H7-10.05

Overview
- Manufacturer: Autosan-Bussan (2000–2002); Autosan (2002–2006)
- Production: 2000–2006
- Assembly: Sanok; Poland

Body and chassis
- Body style: midi class bus
- Doors: 1 or 2

Powertrain
- Engine: 1) Iveco 8040.45; 2) Iveco 8040SRC21; 3) Iveco F4AE0482; 4) Andoria 4CT107; 5) MMZ 245.9-337
- Transmission: 1) TS5-40; 2) Iveco 2845.5; 3) Iveco 2855.01

Dimensions
- Wheelbase: 4,100 mm (160 in)
- Length: 2,280 mm (90 in); 2,376 mm (93.5 in) (since 2001)
- Width: 2,500 mm (98 in)
- Height: 2,792 mm (109.9 in); 2,845 mm (112.0 in) (since 2001)
- Curb weight: 7,700 kg (17,000 lb) (H7-10.01); 8,800 kg (19,400 lb) (H7-10 Traper); 8,900 kg (19,600 lb) (Trafic)

Autosan H7 is a series of mini-class city, intercity, and specialized buses, introduced in 1999 and mass-produced between 2000 and 2006, initially by the Autosan-Bussan company and later by Autosan in Sanok.

The H7 family replaced the H6 series, which had been in serial production since 1992. The concept and design of the H6 served as the basis for developing the early versions of the Autosan H7, produced between 2000 and 2001. In 2001, the series underwent a significant modernization, introducing a new body design and modifications to the chassis and drivetrain. The production of the final variants ended in 2006 with the introduction of the new Autosan Solina mini-class bus family.

The Solina models featured entirely different design solutions, replacing the traditional ladder-frame chassis with a frame chassis based on the Mercedes-Benz Vario light truck. Despite these technical differences, the Solina series retained the H7 designation until the end of 2010, with the intercity version labeled H7-10MB Solina and the city variant H7-20MB Solina LE/Solina City. The production of the Solina/Solina City models ended in 2011, with the Autosan Wetlina series becoming their successor.

== Origins ==
The decline in urban and intercity transport observed in the second half of the 1990s, along with growing competition in the mini-class bus segment, led Autosan-Bussan, a company spun off from Autosan and specializing in the production of front-engine urban and intercity buses of the Autosan H6 series offered since 1992, to begin work on a new model designated H7. By the late 1990s, the Polish market saw a significant increase in the sales of mini-class buses, both urban and intercity. The main competitor for the Sanok-based manufacturer became Kapena, which, in cooperation with the Italian company Cacciamali, developed the Kapena City urban bus in 1997, based on the chassis of the Iveco TurboDaily A59.12 delivery vehicle. Around the same time, the market saw the introduction of Turkish-manufactured buses from the Anadolu, Otoyol, and TEMSA brands, based on chassis supplied by Isuzu and Mitsubishi. In an effort to curb the decline in its bus sales, Autosan-Bussan, after consulting with customers, began developing a new series of mini-class buses based on the solutions used in the Autosan H6-10 and H6-20. Compared to its predecessor, the new series offered increased passenger space and improved driving characteristics.

== Mass-produced models ==
=== Autosan H7-10.01/H7-20.01 ===
In 1999, the prototype of a new intercity bus designated Autosan H7-10.01 was unveiled. The new vehicle was developed as an improved version of the H6-10 model, which had been in production since 1992. The changes introduced aimed to address the needs of existing H6-series bus users, who had raised concerns about the insufficient number of passenger seats, weak performance, and excessive fuel consumption.

Compared to the older H6-10 model, the modernized Autosan H7-10.01 featured an extended body, lengthened by 797 mm to a total of 7,152 mm, while maintaining full structural and stylistic unification with its predecessor. The prototype was equipped with a single-leaf door, manually operated and located on the right side of the body between the axles, arranged in a 0-1-0 configuration. On the left side, a separate door was provided for the driver. The interior was designed to accommodate 35 passengers, including 28 seated. The bus was powered by a turbocharged, four-cylinder inline diesel engine, the Iveco 8040.45, with a displacement of 3,908 cm^{3} and a maximum output of 100 kW (136 hp), compliant with Euro 2 emissions standards. The engine was paired with a six-speed manual Iveco 2855.01 gearbox. The chassis featured a rigid front axle and a rigid rear drive axle, both mounted on leaf springs and supplied by FSC Star from Starachowice. Production of the H7-10 model began in 2000. Compared to the prototype, the production versions were equipped with single-leaf, outward-opening, pneumatically operated doors. An optional variant was available with a second set of doors located at the rear overhang. In the first year of production, 12 units of this model were delivered to customers.

Alongside the H7-10, an urban version designated Autosan H7-20.01 was developed. Like the intercity variant, this model featured a body extended by 797 mm compared to its predecessor, the Autosan H6-20.03, increasing passenger capacity to 38, including 20 seated. Access to the interior was provided by pneumatically operated doors in a 0-2-1 configuration, with double-leaf doors behind the front axle and a single-leaf door at the rear overhang. The vehicle was powered by the same 100 kW (136 hp) Iveco 8040.45 engine as the H7-10 but paired with a five-speed manual Iveco 2845.5 gearbox. In 2000, at the request of the Rapid-Bus company, which operated urban transport services in Warsaw, a version of the Autosan H7-20 was developed with a four-cylinder inline diesel engine, the Andoria 4CT107, with a displacement of 4,360 cm^{3} and a maximum output of 77 kW (105 hp). This engine was paired with a five-speed TS5-40 manual transmission.

=== Autosan H7-10.02/H7-20.02 ===
In 2001, a significantly modernized version of the H7 series was introduced – the intercity bus H7-10.02, marketed under the new trade name H7-10 Traper. The vehicle featured an entirely new body design, breaking away from the styling of the older H7-10.01/H7-20.01 models and the H6 series. Compared to its predecessor, the new bus was 201 mm longer (7,353 mm), 96 mm wider (2,376 mm), and 55 mm taller (2,847 mm), resulting in an expanded passenger space that could accommodate 28 seated passengers and an additional 7 standing passengers. The .02 body variant incorporated several exterior components borrowed from the A10 family of buses, such as headlights and turn signal lamps. All windows were installed using an adhesive bonding method. The door layout remained unchanged in a 0-1-0 configuration, with pneumatically operated doors. A separate driver's door was positioned on the left side of the vehicle.

The bus was powered by an upgraded four-cylinder Iveco 8040SRC21 engine, compliant with Euro 2 emission standards, with a displacement of 3,908 cm^{3} and a maximum output of 100 kW (136 hp). This engine was paired with a six-speed manual Iveco 2855 gearbox. Significant modifications were made to the chassis, featuring a rigid front beam axle and a single-stage rear drive axle supplied by MAN SE. These components were mounted on parabolic leaf springs, supplemented by hydraulic shock absorbers and a rear axle stabilizer. The pneumatically controlled braking system included disc brakes on both axles, along with an ABS system.

The urban version, Autosan H7-20.02, was unveiled in September 2001 during the Public Transport Exhibition in Łódź. Like the intercity variant, it featured a redesigned and enlarged body with a new styling approach. Marketed under the name Autosan H7-20 Trafic, it was designed to carry 50 passengers, including 18 seated. The powertrain consisted of the same Iveco 8040SRC21 Euro 2 engine, but its power was transmitted to the rear axle via a five-speed manual Iveco 2845 gearbox. In 2002, a minor update was introduced, replacing the previously used two-section window doors with a new design featuring a single large glass pane.

=== Autosan H7-10.04/H7-20.04 ===
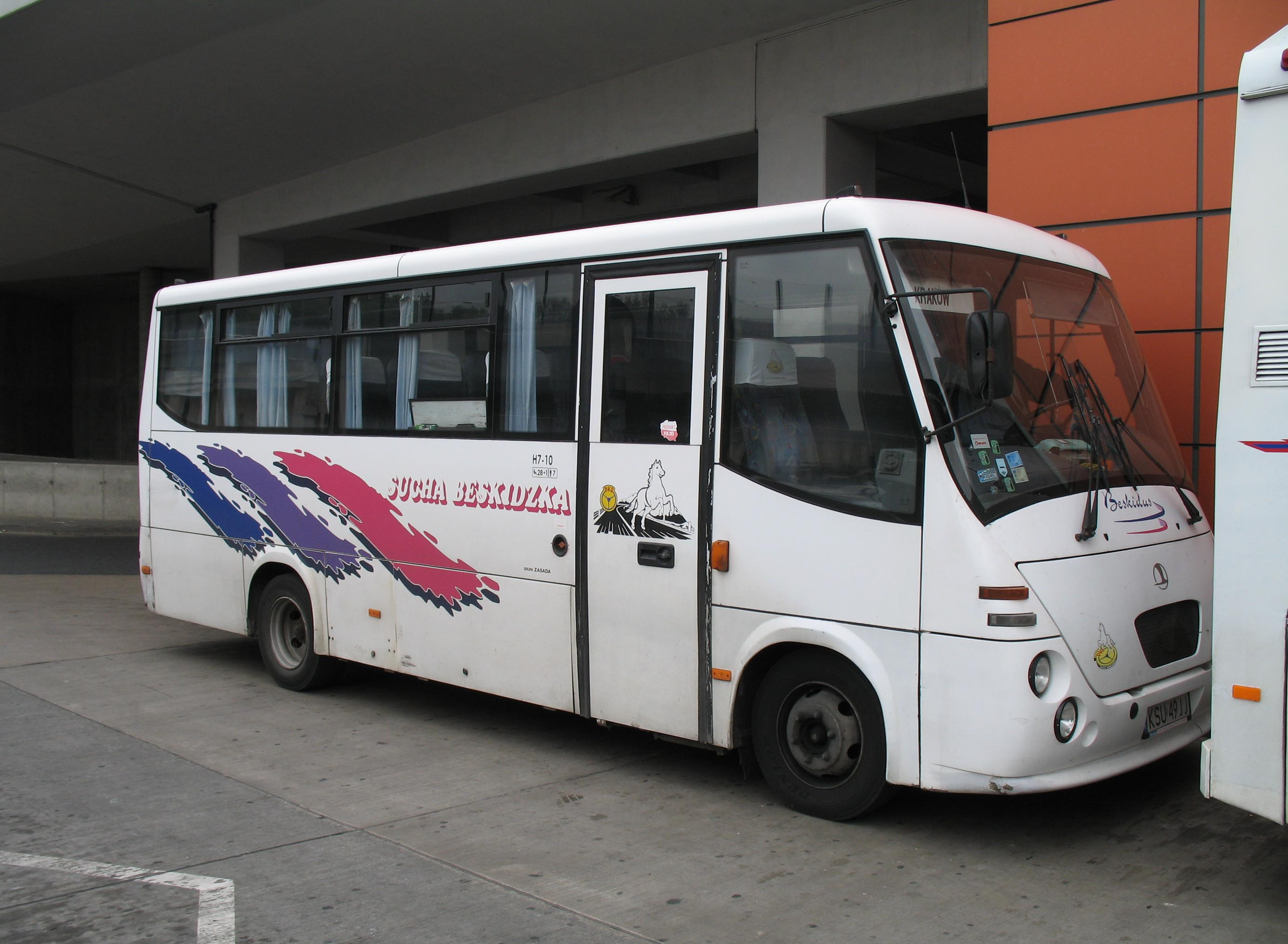
Autosan H7-10.04

A further modernization of the H7 series was carried out in 2002. The main changes affected the drivetrain, where a front axle and rear drive axle from FON Radomsko were used, replacing the components from MAN. The adoption of these new parts resulted in an increased wheelbase, requiring the addition of wider wheel arches to ensure that the wheels did not protrude beyond the body of the bus. Modifications were also made to the driver's workstation, with a new dashboard introduced, featuring a set of indicators taken from the French Renault Midlum truck. The intercity version, H7-10 Traper, was offered in a configuration designed to carry 35 passengers, with 28 seated, or in a variant equipped with 24 seats with adjustable backs. The configuration of the drivetrain remained unchanged, still using the Iveco 8040SRC21 Euro 2 engine with a maximum output of 100 kW (136 hp), which was coupled with a six-speed manual transmission in the H7-10 Traper model or a five-speed transmission in the H7-20 Trafic model.

In 2003, Autosan began a collaboration with the Belarusian company Briestgruzawtoserwis, with the goal of establishing the Briest-Autosan company and starting assembly of Polish buses at a plant located in the special economic zone in Brest. The first three prototype units of the Autosan H7-10 Traper model were assembled in 2003. Compared to the units produced in Poland, these featured a 4-cylinder diesel engine produced by the Minsk Engine Factory, the MMZ 245.9-337, with a displacement of around 4.7 liters and a maximum output of 100 kW (136 hp), paired with a manual transmission from ZiL. However, the attempt to establish the Polish-Belarusian joint venture and begin the assembly and sale of the Autosan H7-10 buses on the Belarusian market was unsuccessful, primarily due to competition from manufacturers offering cheaper buses of the same class.

=== Autosan H7-10MB/H7-20MB Solina ===
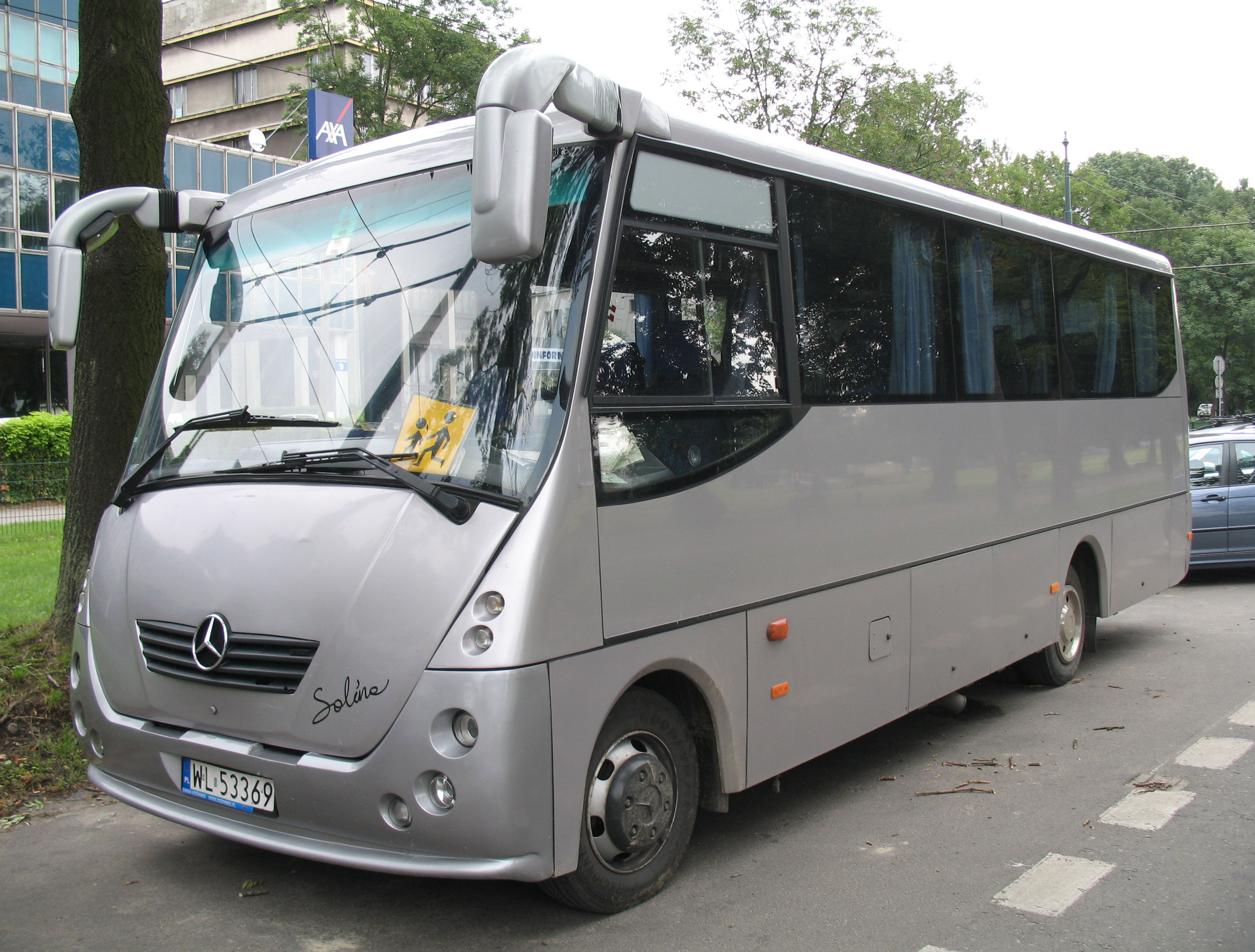
Autosan H7-10MB Solina

In 2005, a new representative of the small bus series produced in Sanok was presented – the Autosan H7-10.06 model, marketed under the trade name H7-10MB Solina. The design of the new vehicle was based on the chassis of the light commercial vehicle Mercedes-Benz Vario. The use of this new chassis contributed to an increase in the vehicle's length by 417 mm (to 7,770 mm) compared to the older version. Significant changes were also made to the body styling, particularly noticeable in the front section.

The serial production of the Solina began in 2006, with the introduction of the urban version H7-20.06 Solina City, and its version with a lowered floor at the rear overhang. At the end of 2010, the code designation "H7" was removed from the trade name. From that point on, the vehicles were named either Autosan Solina or Autosan Solina City, depending on the version. Ultimately, the serial production of Solina buses ended in late 2011.

== Special versions ==
=== Autosan H7-10ZK ===
The production of the first small prison buses based on solutions from the H6 series was initiated by the Autosan factory in 1993. The successor to these vehicles was the Autosan H7-10ZK, initially based on the design of the intercity bus H7-10.04, and later on the upgraded version H7-10.05. The Sanok prison bus was offered in two equipment variants, differing in the configuration of the passenger area. Variant I featured a single pair of entry doors in a 0-1-0 arrangement and was adapted to carry 25 people in two separate compartments. The first compartment was designed for 3 guards and the driver, while the second compartment had 21 seating places for prisoners. Variant II featured a division into three compartments: the first for 3 guards and the driver, the second for the transport of 17 detainees, and the third a luggage compartment with a volume of 3.6 m^{3}, accessible through a second pair of manually operated doors located at the rear overhang. In both versions, the section for prisoners was finished with materials ensuring minimal comfort during the journey. The seats were equipped with hard plywood backs, and the floor was covered with corrugated aluminum sheet. Natural light was provided through small, grate-protected fixed windows located near the top edge of the side walls. The ventilation system consisted of an exhaust fan and roof vents, while heating was provided by two electric heaters. The additional equipment in the section for prisoners included 4 lighting lamps, a sound system, an alarm button, and two ceiling-mounted luggage shelves. The vehicle's electrical system featured an independent installation for the prisoners' compartment. The standard equipment of the prison bus also included a chemical toilet in the cabin, designed to allow access for both the guards and the prisoners, without the risk of prisoners reaching the area occupied by the guards and the driver.

=== Autosan H7-10I ===
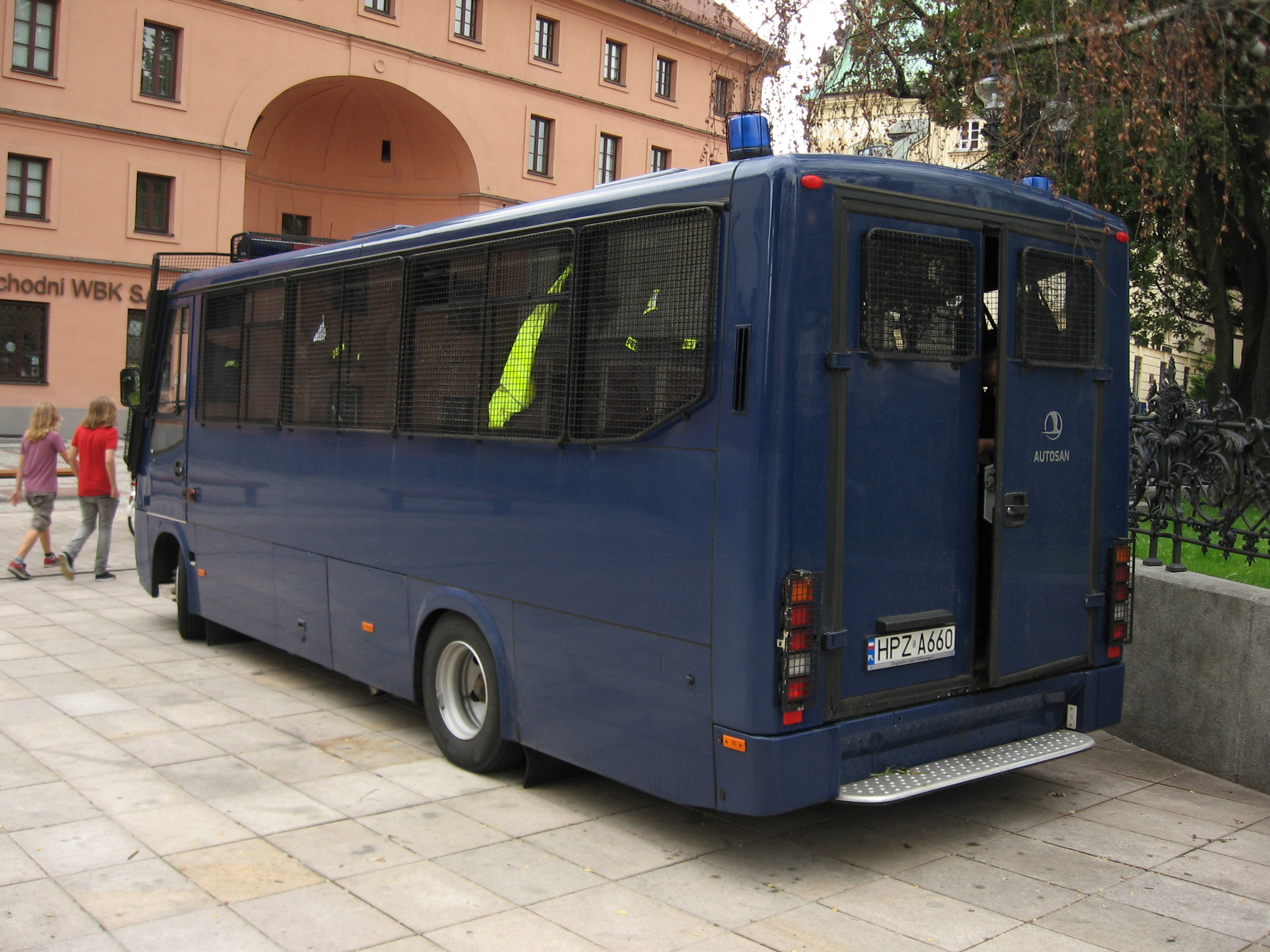
Autosan H7-10I

In 2005, a special version of the Autosan H7-10.04 was developed for the Police, known as the Autosan H7-10I. This intervention bus was equipped with an Iveco 8040SCR21.11 engine, with a displacement of 3,908 cm^{3} and a maximum power of 100 kW (136 HP). It was designed for use by the Prevention Units and served to transport 30 people, including 28 officers with their equipment, the commander, and the driver.

Significant changes were made to the interior, where metal folding seats were placed along the side walls of the bus. Behind the seats, hangers for jackets and racks for batons and long weapons were installed. Instead of overhead luggage shelves, brackets were provided to hang protective helmets. In the center of the passenger space, between the seats, stands for riot shields were installed. Additionally, at the front of the interior, near the driver, there was a seat for the vehicle commander, positioned backward to the direction of travel.

The exterior of the H7-10I was distinguished by the use of grille protection on the lights and all windows, with the front window's grille being automatically raised or lowered. Similar to the intercity version, the intervention bus featured a single-wing, pneumatically operated door on the right side in a 0-1-0 configuration, along with additional doors for the driver on the left side. To allow quick exit for intervening officers, a double-winged door was installed in the rear wall. A total of 10 units were produced in 2005, followed by another 6 units in 2006.

== Export ==
As early as 2000, the first three units of the intercity bus Autosan H7-10.01 were exported to Latvia. In 2003, as a result of cooperation with the company Briestgruzawtoserwis, three units of the model H7-10 Traper were assembled in Brest, Belarus. At that time, plans were made to establish the Polish-Belarusian company Briest-Autosan, which was expected to assemble 50 buses in 2004. Other foreign customers included transport companies from Romania, where between 2004 and 2006, 12 units of the city bus Autosan H7-20 Trafic were delivered.

== Construction ==
=== Body ===
The body of the H7 series models was constructed using square and rectangular steel tubes, welded together. The body was based on a longitudinal and truss frame. The exterior cladding of the side walls was made of chromium-nickel steel with enhanced corrosion resistance. The pneumatically controlled entrance doors, operated from the driver's seat, opened outward in the H7-10 model or inward in the H7-20 model. The front and rear walls were made of plastic materials, fixed to the body frame using adhesive, while the side hatches were made of aluminum. In the intercity version H7-10, the ceiling and side walls of the interior were finished with panels covered in fabric upholstery, while the city model H7-20 used laminated boards. The floor in both models was covered with PVC flooring. Ventilation was provided through window openings, roof hatches, openings in the front wall, and exhaust vents. In the case of the Autosan H7-10 Traper, there was an option to order an air conditioning system for the passenger compartment as an additional feature. Heating was provided by a heating unit connected to the engine's cooling system, along with additional heaters.

=== Suspension and braking system ===
The H7 series buses were equipped with a dependent suspension using a rigid front axle and a rigid rear drive axle supplied by MAN-Star Trucks. These were based on parabolic leaf springs, telescopic shock absorbers, and roll stabilizers. The first-generation H7-10.01/H7-20.01 models featured a pneumatic braking system with drum brakes on both axles and an ABS system. In 2001, with the introduction of the new H7-10 Traper and H7-20 Trafic models, the braking system was upgraded to include disc brakes. Since 2002, the primary components of the suspension system included the front rigid axle and the rear drive axle supplied by FON Radomsko. These new components had a wider wheelbase than the MAN axles, which required changes to the body, including the widening of the wheel arches.

=== Electrical system ===
The H7 series models, both in the intercity and urban versions, were equipped with a 24 V nominal voltage electrical system. For buses equipped with engines meeting Euro 2 emission standards, an 80 A alternator was used, while for Euro 3 engine versions, a 90 A alternator was installed. To store the generated electrical power, two 120 Ah batteries were used. The H7-10ZK prison bus was equipped with a separate electrical system for the section intended for transporting prisoners. The electrical system powered the bus' essential systems, such as the engine power supply, external and internal lighting, heating, ventilation system, and pneumatic installation. Additionally, at the customer's request, there was the option to install extra electrical devices such as an air conditioner, refrigerator, radio, or vending machine in the H7-10 model, or in the urban version H7-20, validators, electronic controllers, and information boards.
