= Autosan H6 =

Family of high-floor mini-class buses manufactured by Autosan

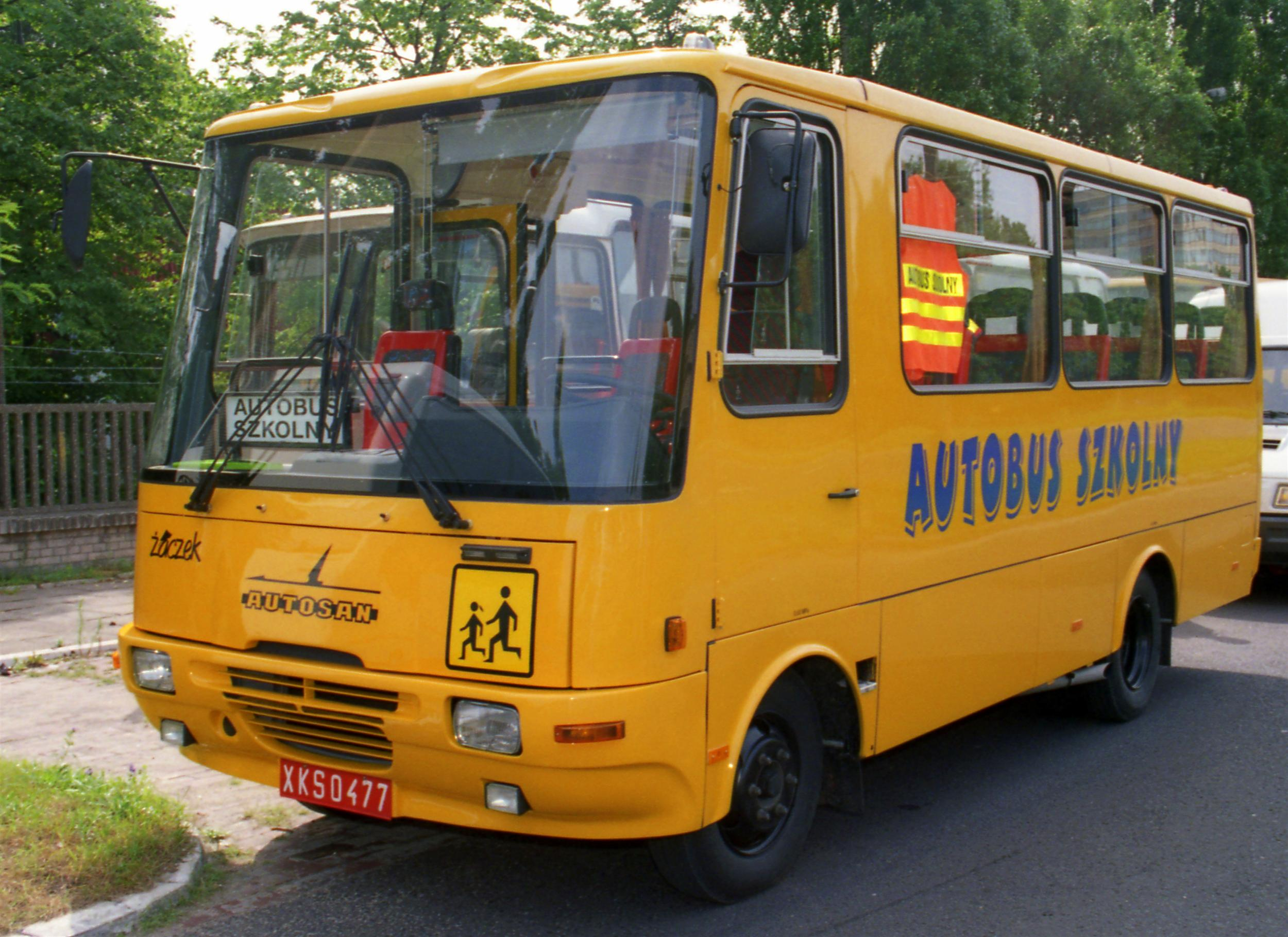
- Autosan H6-10.03S Żaczek in 1999

Overview
- Manufacturer: Autosan; Autosan Bussan
- Also called: Autosan H6 Melon; Autosan H6 Żaczek; Autosan H6 Towos; City-bus
- Production: 1992–2000
- Assembly: Sanok, Poland

Body and chassis
- Body style: Mini-class bus
- Doors: 1; 2

Powertrain
- Engine: Andoria 4CT107; Perkins Phaser 110 Ti
- Power output: 105 Hp; 79 kW (107 Hp)
- Transmission: FPS TS5 – 40 (5-speed)

Dimensions
- Wheelbase: 3,320 mm (131 in)
- Length: 6,355 mm (250.2 in)
- Width: 2,280 mm (90 in)
- Height: 2,792 mm (109.9 in)
- Curb weight: 7,000 kg (15,000 lb)

The Autosan H6 is a family of high-floor mini-class buses manufactured by Autosan and Autosan-Bussan in Sanok. The produced versions of the bus included: urban, regional, cargo-passenger, van, prison transport, and school (based on the regional version).

== History ==
=== Origins ===
In 1950, the Łódź branch of the Central Technical Bureau of the Automotive Industry designed the prototype of the first post-war Polish mini-class bus. This bus was based on the chassis of the Star 20 truck. In December 1951, a modified model, the Star 51, was developed. The next model in this series was the Star N52 mini-class bus, whose production was moved to Sanok. However, the bus did not perform well in operational conditions, as there was a need for longer buses (midibuses). In 1959, a microbus called Nysa N59 was developed based on a van.

Autosan began serial production of buses in 1950 under the name San, although the first bus in the Sanok factory was built in 1928. In 1964, in cooperation with ZSD Nysa, the SFA-2 minibus, 8.6 meters long, was created. Based on this model, the prototype SFA-3 bus was developed, which belonged to the midi class. However, neither of these models entered serial production. In 1973, the 9-meter midi-class bus Autosan H9 was introduced. In 1983, the Autosan H10, extended by one meter, was developed. At that time, neither Autosan nor the other Polish bus manufacturer, Jelcz, produced mini-class buses to serve routes with low traffic volume. The development of urban transport in suburban areas, night transport, and the needs of schools, hotels, and sanatoriums for small buses necessitated the construction of buses of this size, as the microbuses available on the market were too small. The economic crisis of the 1980s, which caused problems not only in prototype development but also in the supply of parts, led to delays and changes in the projects.

=== Prototypes ===
==== H6-01 and H6-02 ====
In 1984, Autosan presented two front-engine prototypes of a 6-meter-long mini-class bus: the urban Autosan H6-01 and the intercity Autosan H6-02. These vehicles used a 4-cylinder WSW Andrychów SW266 engine (based on the 6c107 engine with 2 cylinders removed). The engine, producing 79 HP (later increased to 91 HP), turned out to be too weak. However, these vehicles demonstrated that buses of this size were necessary. The smaller engine and lower weight compared to maxi-class buses, which dominated the Provincial Transport Company fleets, resulted in significant fuel savings. Additionally, the production of smaller buses was expected to save materials used in construction, which were difficult to obtain due to the economic crisis.

==== H6-03 ====
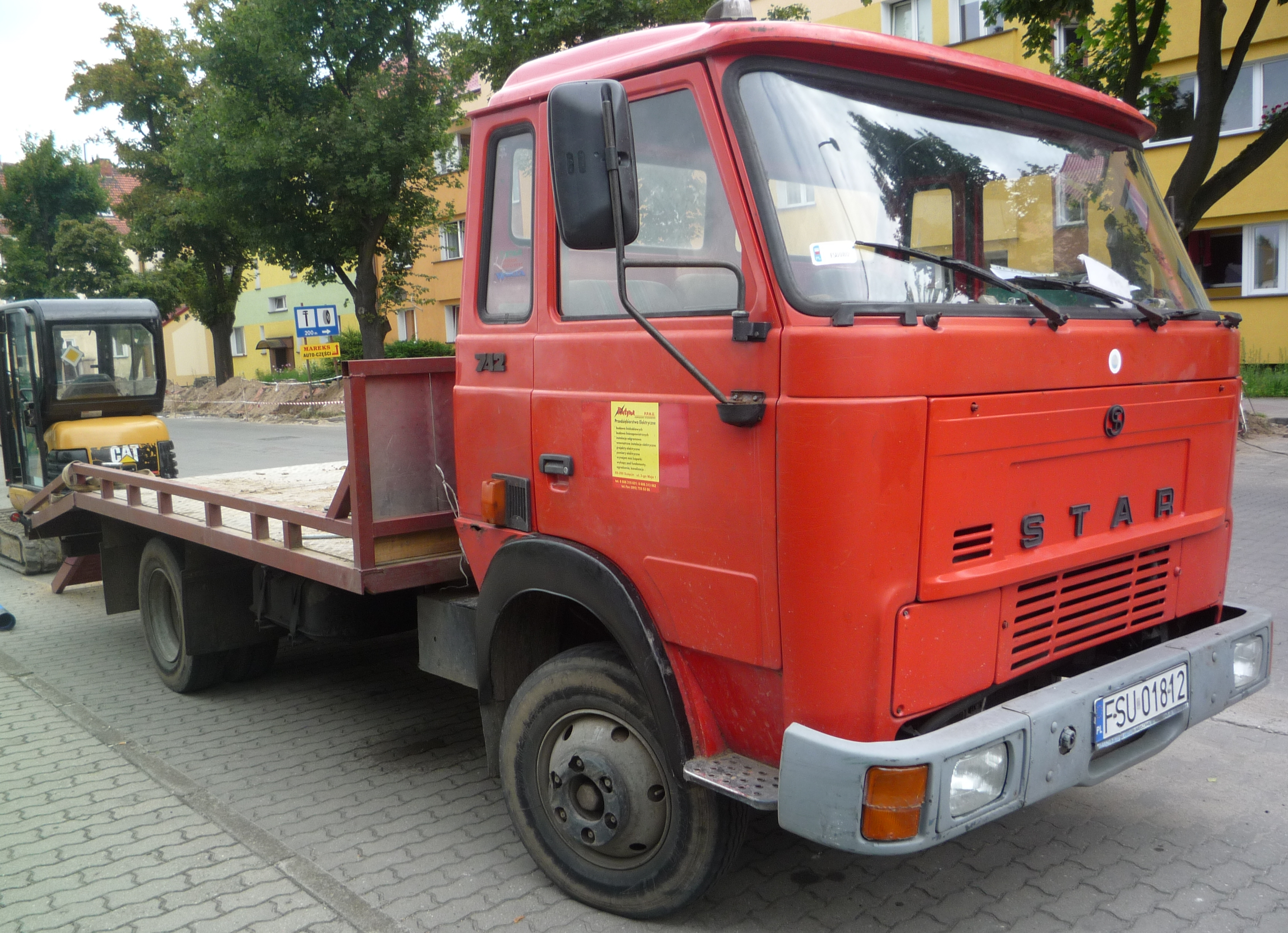
Star 742

The economic crisis of the 1980s affected the supply to the Sanok factory, delaying the production of the Star 742. However, three prototype bodies were built in intercity, urban, and van versions. In 1988, only one urban bus was produced and sent to Pomerania. This bus differed from its predecessors with a different window layout. The second engine obtained was used in a prototype van.

==== H6-04 ====
With the start of serial production of the Star 742, Autosan resumed cooperation with Star. The first Autosan H6 buses used chassis produced between 1990 and 1991. The buses were equipped with Andoria 4cT107 and Perkins Phaser 110T engines, which later entered serial production.

In 1993, a van was developed based on the bus. This vehicle was mechanically based on the Autosan H6-04 bus. A total of 18 Autosan H6-50 vans and 16 Autosan H6-56 cargo-passenger vehicles (with 9 seats and a load capacity of 1.7 tons) were produced. The designation Autosan H6-50 was duplicated from a 1988 prototype based on the Autosan H6-03 version.

==== H6-05 and H6-30 ====
In 1988, Autosan began collaborating with the Hungarian company Ikarus. Autosan was to build chassis based on the Autosan H6 model for the planned Ikarus 500 series minibus. However, the Hungarian partner withdrew, leaving the Sanok factory with ready chassis. These chassis were later used to build the Autosan H6-05 model and the Autosan H6-30 model, which was presented at the Poznań International Fair in 1989. The two versions differed only in details, with the H6-05 having single doors and the H6-30 having double doors.

==== H6-06 ====
The Autosan H6-06 version was developed in 1988 in cooperation with the Yugoslav company TAM-Europe. The bus was equipped with a complete TAM drivetrain.

In 1993, two Autosan H6-06 buses were purchased by Toruń. These were among the first minibuses used in urban transport. The small orange buses were assigned to serve line 36, which connected the Brzezina neighborhood with the city center. As line 36 was extended, these buses became too small for the route. Initially, they were moved to other lightly loaded lines (16, 29, 30, and 32). In 2000, due to the purchase of Jelcz M081MB buses, the Autosans were no longer needed. One was eventually sold, and the other was converted into a technical emergency vehicle.

==== H6-07 Lux ====
In 1989, another version of the Autosan H6 was created. This vehicle was based on the chassis intended for Ikarus (H6-05 version) with the TAM drivetrain (H6-06 version). However, this bus was a luxury minibus for intercity transport. Its standard was comparable to Western designs. The bus could carry 15 passengers (all seated) and was equipped with a radio and a refrigerator. In addition to the demonstration model, one vehicle was produced for a customer in Norway, which was additionally equipped with a toilet.

In 1991, another Autosan H6-07 bus was produced with an engine from Andrychów.

==== H6 – cooperation with Iveco ====
In 1990, Autosan began cooperating with Iveco. Initially, this was based on the Iveco TurboDaily model. However, due to the different engine placement, the body had to be modified. The H6 body turned out to be too heavy for the Iveco TurboDaily chassis. A better base was the TurboZeta. Only three units were produced, but they were not based on the Iveco truck. Instead, some elements from Italy were installed, including the Iveco 8040.25 4-cylinder engine with 84.5 kW (115 HP), the 5-speed mechanical Iveco 2846 gearbox, and the rigid front axle and Iveco drive axle. The first bus left the assembly line in June 1992, followed by two more in November 1992 and January 1993.

==== H6 – cooperation with IFA ====
In 1991, Autosan began cooperating with the German (former East German) company IFA, the manufacturer of small Robur trucks. The German side provided three Robur chassis with drivetrains (4-cylinder Deutz engine). The Sanok factory used this chassis to build an intercity bus, a cargo-passenger vehicle with 7+1 seats, and a van with 2+1 seats. However, the deteriorating financial condition of the German manufacturer led to the discontinuation of further cooperation.

=== Serial version ===
==== H6-10 and H6-20 ====
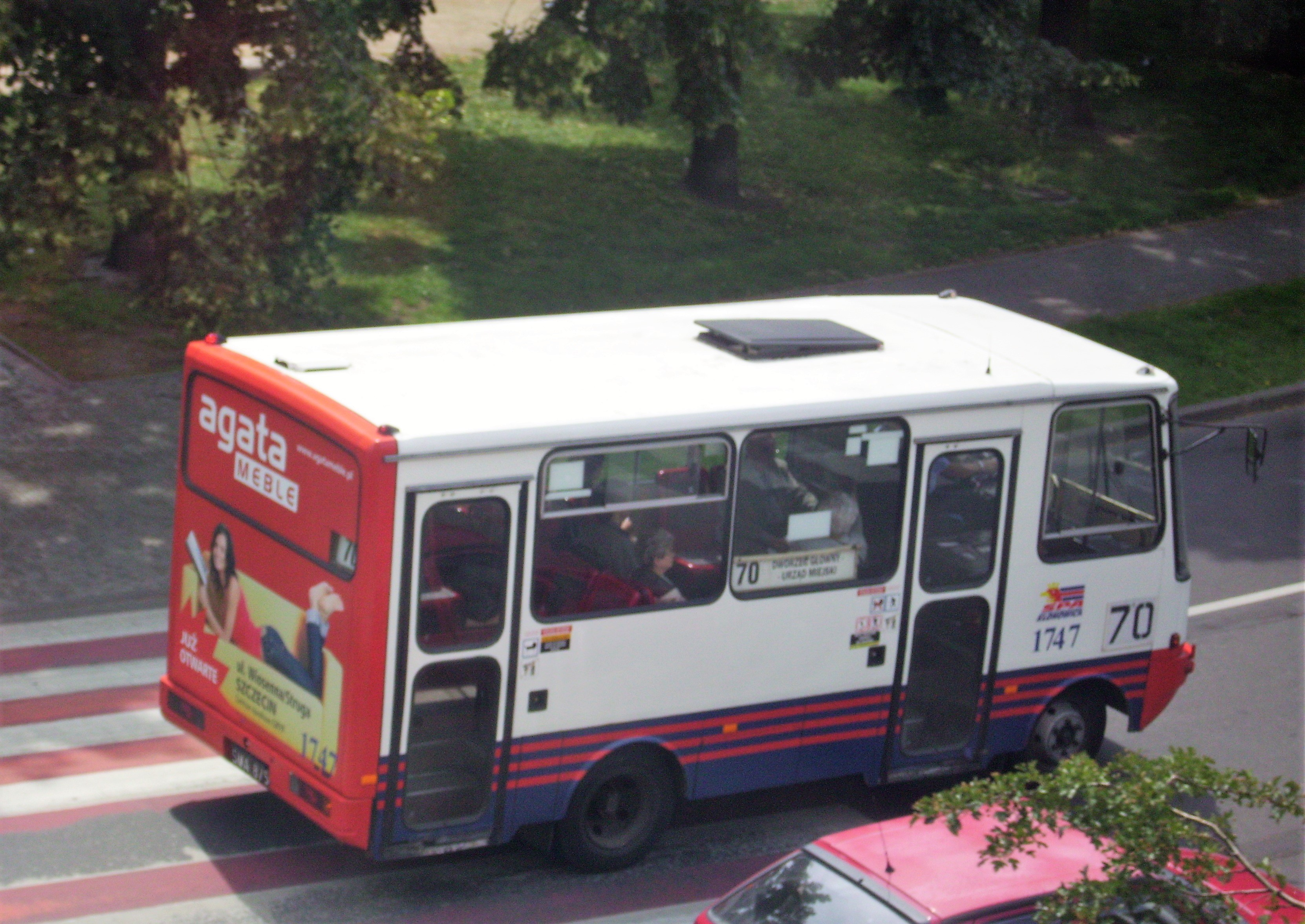
Autosan H6 in Szczecin

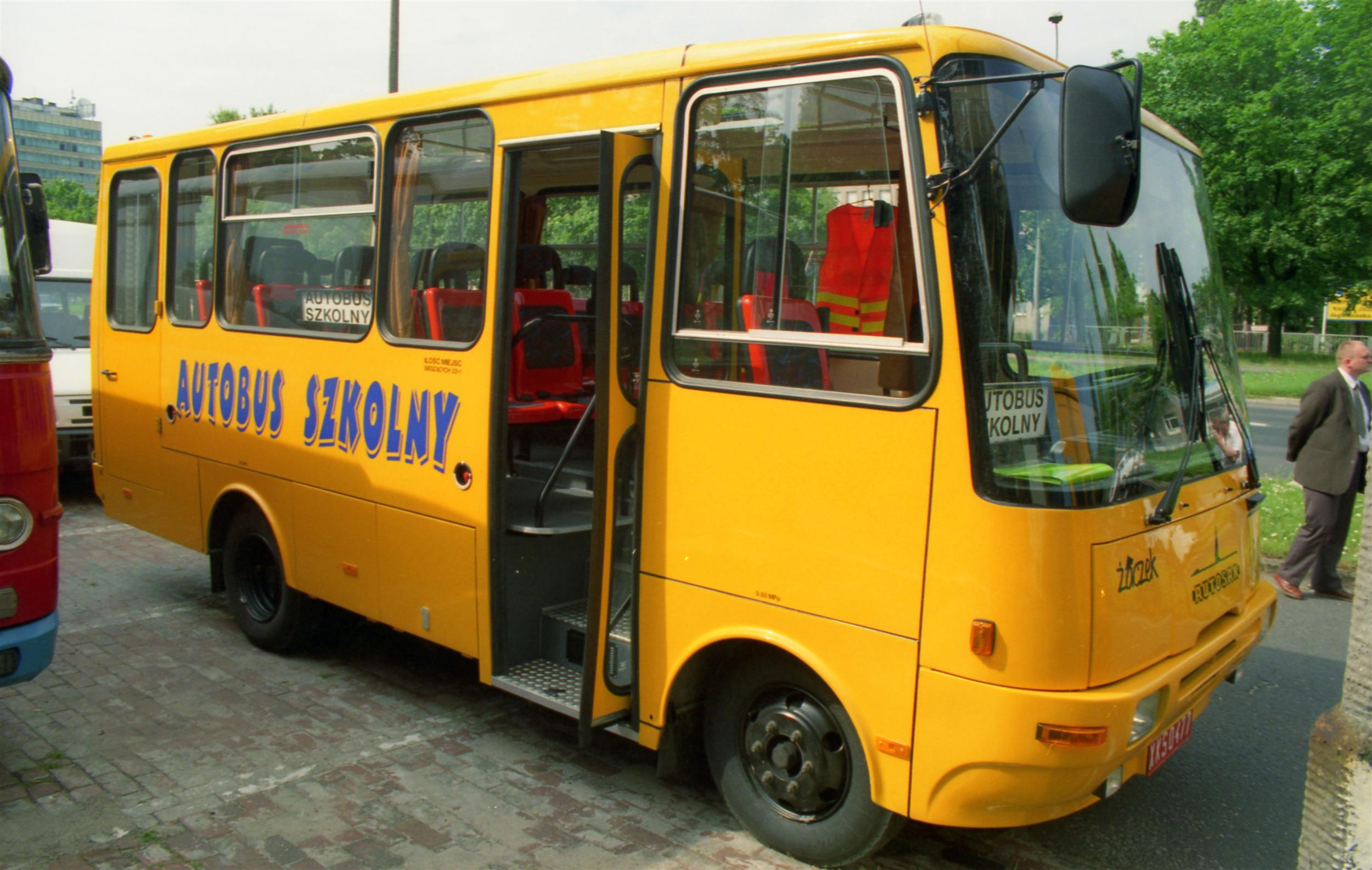
Autosan H6-10 Żaczek

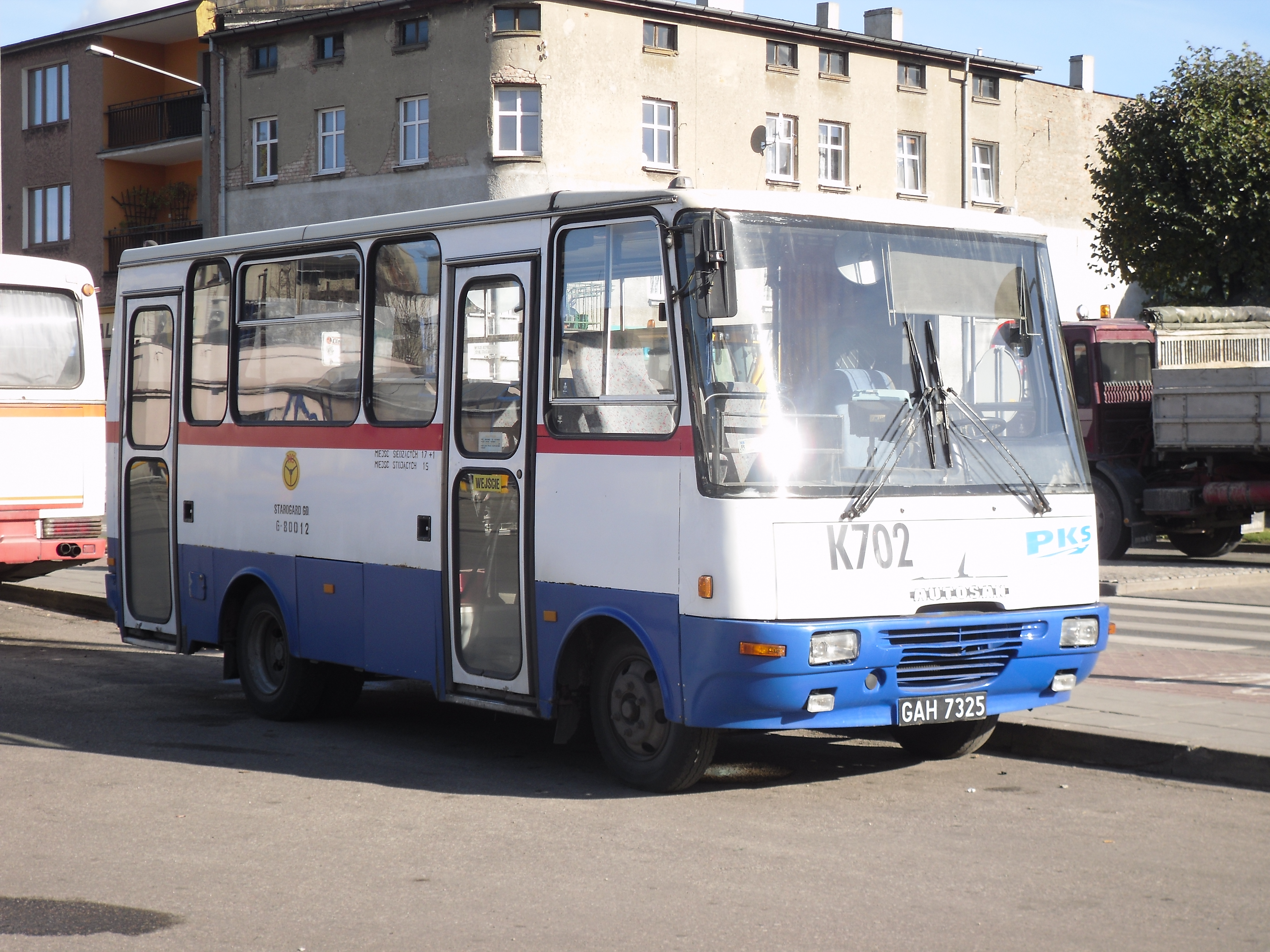
Autosan H6-20 in Kościerzyn

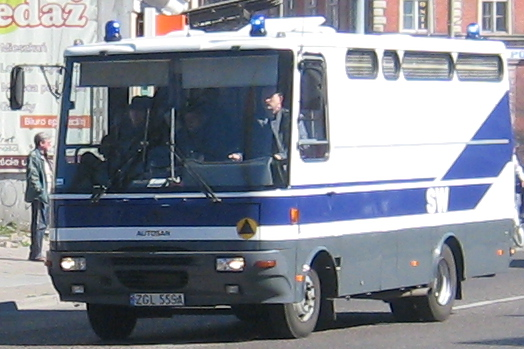
Autosan H6-ZK

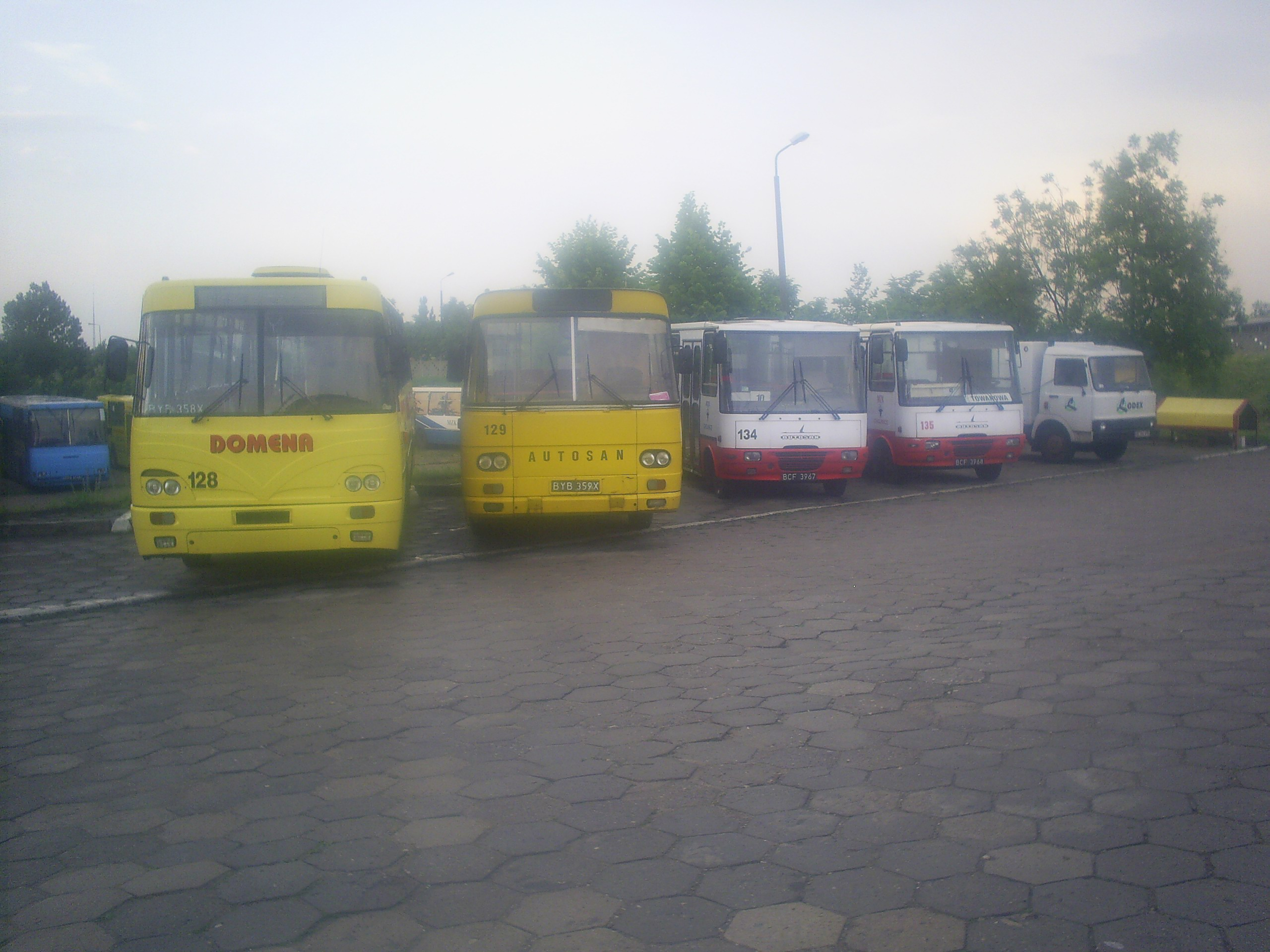
Autosans H9-35 and H6-20

In 1996, the body of the Autosan H6 was modernized, being lengthened by 20.5 cm and raised by 15.7 cm. The bus was equipped with a Perkins Phaser engine with a power output of 79 kW (107 HP). The new buses were named Autosan H6-10 (intercity) and Autosan H6-20 (city). The largest customer for these buses was Kraków, which ordered them to reduce costs on routes with low passenger volume. However, despite the low number of passengers, there was a high turnover at stops, which made the single pair of doors impractical. A two-door version was created specifically for this operator.

Production of the Autosan H6 series (H6-10 and H6-20) ended in 2000. It was replaced by the Autosan H7, which was over a meter longer and was first introduced in 1999. The model numbering of the Autosan H7 was retained from its predecessor.

=== Special and utility versions ===
==== H6-50 and H6-56 ====
The names Autosan H6-50 and Autosan H6-56, unlike the passenger versions, were shared designations for vehicles built on the Autosan H6 bus base, regardless of the original bus version. The Autosan H6-50 was a two-seat van, while the Autosan H6-56 was a utility vehicle with 9 seats and a load capacity of 1.7 tons. These specifications made it suitable for use as a technical emergency vehicle. Utility vehicles built on Robur components had 3 and 8 seats.

==== H6-ZK ====
A special version for prisoner transport, Autosan H6-ZK, was also produced. The first Autosan H6-ZK was built in 1993 based on the Autosan H6-04. The bus had 17 seats for inmates and 3 for guards, and it was equipped with a toilet. In 1994, two more prison transport vehicles were built based on the Autosan H6-10 body.

== Construction ==
The construction of the Autosan H6 was based on the chassis of a light truck, the Star 742. The truck-based design necessitated the use of a high floor plate and solutions typically employed in trucks. However, this approach also allowed for reduced construction costs and indirectly lowered operating expenses. Some prototype vehicles used components from other manufacturers, including TAM, Iveco, Robur, Andoria, Rába, and Mercedes-Benz.

=== Powertrain ===
The Autosan H6's powertrain was initially intended to rely on Andoria engines from Andrychów, positioned at the front of the vehicle. Power was to be transmitted through a gearbox from Tczew. However, issues with suppliers and the engines themselves forced cooperation with various international manufacturers, resulting in prototypes being equipped with engines and gearboxes from Perkins, TAM, Iveco, and Deutz.

=== Chassis ===
The bus features a two-axle layout: the front axle is steerable, while the rear axle is the drive axle. Initially, the axles were supplied by Star, but due to problems with the Star 742's design, which was supposed to be used for the axles, axles from various other manufacturers were eventually used.

=== Body ===
The body of the prototypes was angular, differing from the rounded body of the Autosan H9 and the more angular designs of the Autosan H10 and Autosan H11. The body had one pair of double-leaf passenger doors arranged in a 0–2–0 configuration. The presence of the engine on the right side of the driver necessitated an additional door for the driver on the left side of the vehicle.

In subsequent versions, the body became increasingly rounded, with the final versions resembling the shape of the Autosan H10.

=== Interior ===
The interior of the prototypes featured a traditional 2+2 seating arrangement, with the last row having four seats. In the city version, handrails were added for standing passengers. The first and fourth rows of seats were positioned backward, due to their location over the wheel arches. Over time, the seating layout evolved. The last vehicles in the city version had an unusual arrangement: behind the driver, opposite the front doors, was a seat facing sideways, followed by a two-person bench along the left wall, then three benches in a standard configuration (two on the left and one on the right). A bench on the right side faced backward, while on the left was a single sideways seat. Due to the rear doors, the last bench was shortened to three seats.

== Bibliography ==
- Stiasny, Marcin (2008). Atlas autobusów (in Polish). Poznań: Poznański Klub Modelarzy Kolejowych. ISBN 978-83-920757-4-5.
