= Autosan A0808MN =

City bus manufactured in Poland

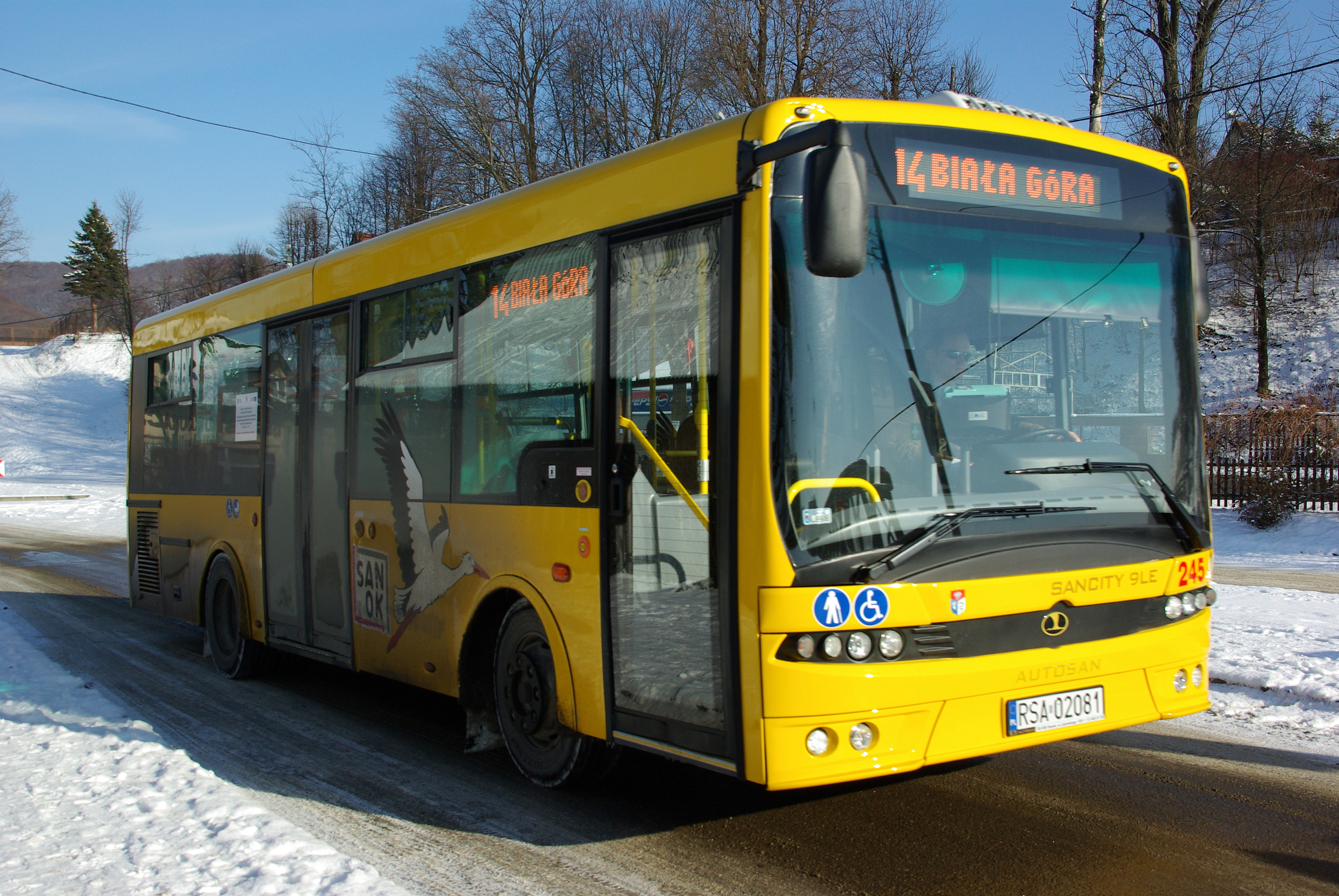

Overview
- Manufacturer: Autosan
- Production: 2008-
- Assembly: Sanok, Poland

Body and chassis
- Class: Single-deck city-bus
- Doors: 2
- Floor type: Low entry

Powertrain
- Engine: Cummins ISBe4 160B Euro 4 Cummins ISB4.5E5 185B Euro 5 Cummins ISB4.5EV 185B EEV; Cummins ISB4.5E6 210B Euro 6
- Capacity: 61
- Power output: 118 kW (160 HP); 136 kW (185 HP); 154 kW (210 HP)
- Transmission: ZF 6S-700BO, manual ZF 6S-1010BO, manual Allison T280R, automatic (optional)

Dimensions
- Length: 8550 mm
- Width: 2420 mm
- Height: 2630 mm 2830 mm (with air conditioning)

Chronology
- Predecessor: Jelcz M083C Libero

The Autosan A0808MN Sancity is a low-entry city bus produced from the autumn of 2008 to mid-2009 in Sanok in Poland by Autosan. Its predecessor was the Jelcz M083C Libero which had an Autosan chassis, and successors are Autosan M09LE Sancity and Sancity 9LE. A0808MN Sancity and which are designed for urban and suburban public transportation services.

== History of the bus model ==
=== Prototype ===
In 2000, the International Trade Fair presented the prototype Autosan A613MN Mini, which was built based on the chassis of the Csepel 613.04. It was the first low-entry bus built by the Autosan company. The bus was equipped with a door 1-2-0 system. The bus had a 4-cylinder Cummins B 135-20 engine which meets Euro 2 standards with a capacity of 5.9 dm and maximum power of 100 kW (136 hp), with a 6-speed ZF 6S-36 manual transmission. It had a length of 7850 mm, width 2400 mm and a height of 2630 mm. The structure was supported by steel pipes with a cross-section joined together by welding. The roof and side walls were made of aluminium and the front and rear walls were made from plastic.

Four prototypes were made of such buses, which were delivered to Bydgoszcz. The bus gained many potential buyers, but trouble's with the Csepel company which provided the chassis meant that Autosan had to find a different company which had built chassis. There was considered cooperation with the Turkish company BMC, but ultimately the company decided to develop their own Autosan chassis for this bus.

After the company Polskie Autobusy was founded, there was development and increased sales of the buses with Autosan and Jelcz brands, in 2002 it was decided to increase the quantity of production. In the main they were built for city public transportation purposes, although some were built for urban and local use making the H7 series, which were transferred to Jelcz. Due to financial difficulties of the Jelcz company, the prototype bus Jelcz M083C Libero had begun being built in 2006. In 2007 the company presented the final model of the bus, and in 2008 the company started its production. The bus was based on the chassis of the bus Autosan Gemini A0808T and was produced in Sanok.

=== Specification of the serial model ===
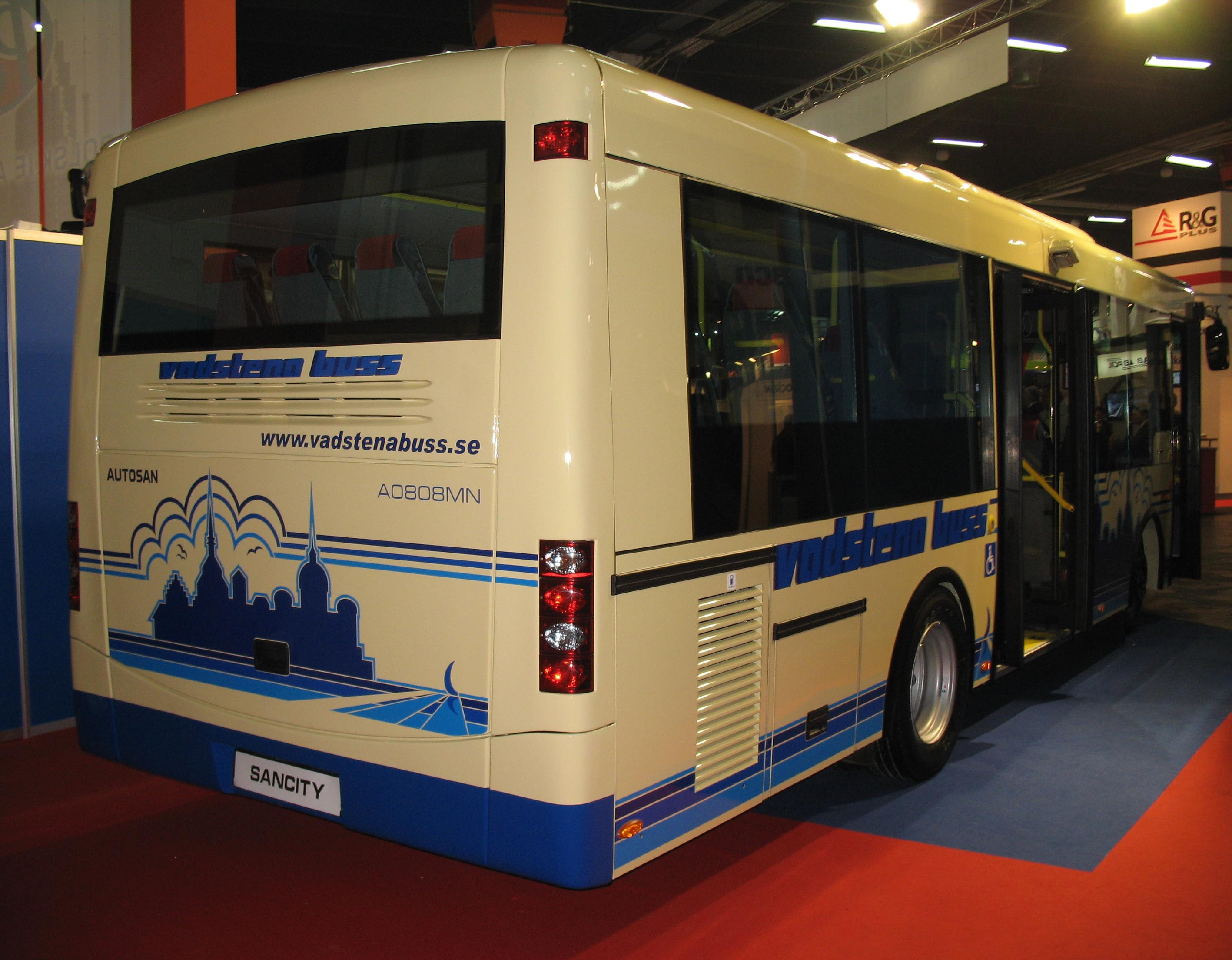
Autosan A0808MN Sancity the rear of the bus.

In October 2008, with the announcement of bankruptcy of Jelcz, Autosan took over (as owner of the rights to the design of the Polskie Autobusy). This bus is now called Autosan A0808MN Sancity and was presented at the Transexpo Trade Fair in Kielce in 2008. In Sanok in 2008, the company built one copy of the bus, which did not have any major stylist differences in between the Jelcz M083C. The bus became popular in Sweden. The serial production of the model Sancity Autosan A0808MN was launched in late 2008. The chassis has a long frame, which is integral with the structure. The body structure is built from stainless steel pipes joined together by welding. The outer structure has stainless steel panels and plastic on the front and the back, welded to the frame of the bus. The rear side flaps are made of aluminium. The bus has a possibility of including air conditioning and monitoring of the passenger compartment. The front LAF axle has been linked by two pneumatic bellows, four shock absorbers and two stabiliser heels. The rear axle built by the Meritor company is linked on four pneumatic bellows, four shock absorbers with a stabiliser heel.
