= Autosan Eurolider 12 =

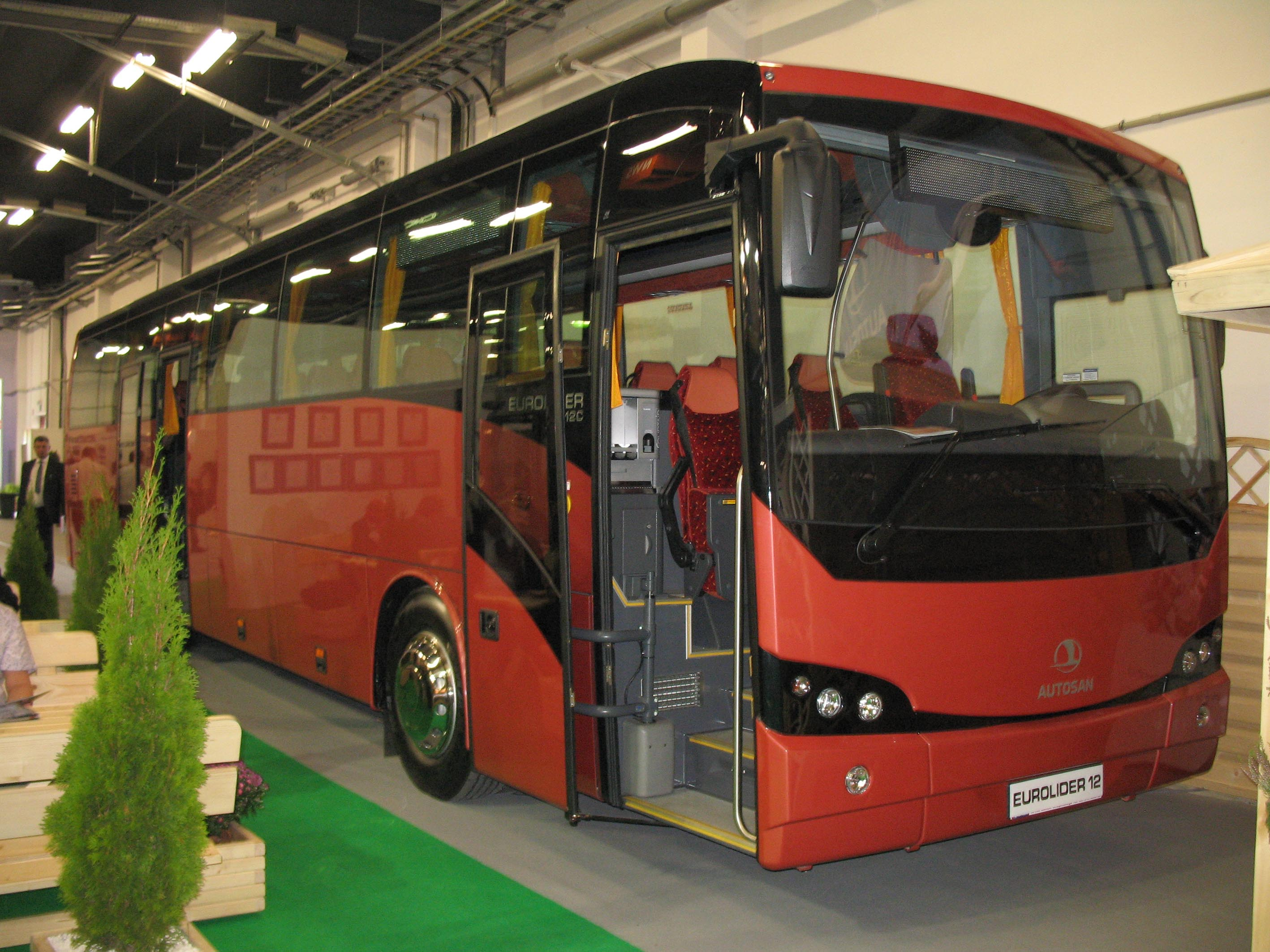
Autosan Eurolider 12

The Autosan Eurolider 12 is an intercity coach manufactured by the Polish company Autosan SA. The bus belongs to the Eurolider product family. Buses manufactured for the UK market are known as Autosan EuroLeader 12 RHD. The Eurolider 12 uses a Cummins ISBe6.7E5 Euro 5 diesel engine.

== Technical sheets ==
Length	12 315 mm
Width	2 550 mm
Seats	53-55
Doors	2 (1 front, 1 centre)
Passengers	78
Maximum weight	18 000 kg

== See also ==
- List of buses
