= Autosan Wetlina =

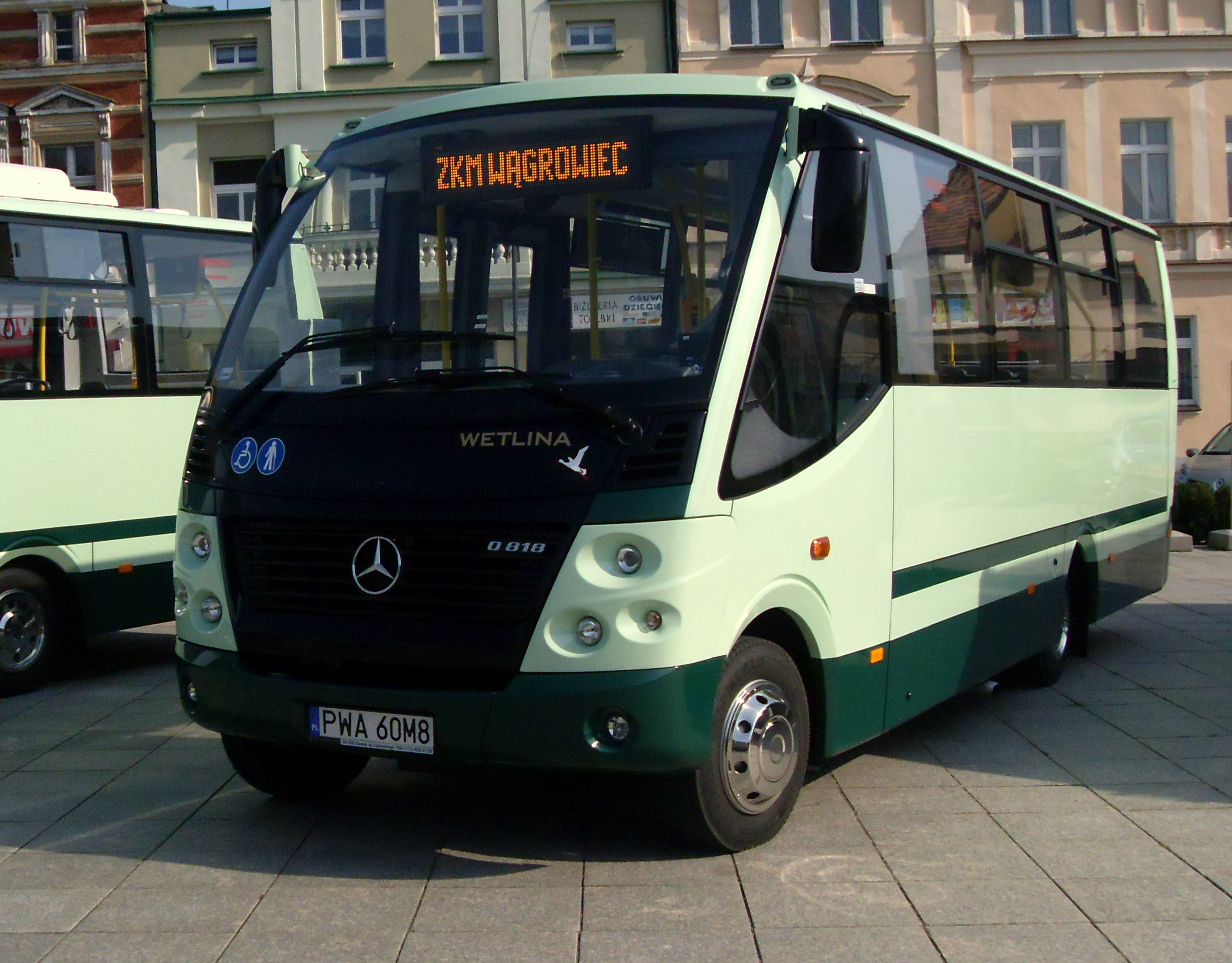

Overview
- Manufacturer: Autosan
- Production: 2008-2013
- Assembly: Sanok, Poland

Body and chassis
- Class: Minibus
- Doors: 2
- Floor type: Low floor

Powertrain
- Engine: MB OM 904 LA Euro 4 MB OM 904 LA Euro 5
- Capacity: 27
- Power output: 130 kW (177 HP)
- Transmission: ZF S5-42, mechanical

Dimensions
- Length: 7965 mm
- Width: 2440 mm
- Height: 2760 mm
- Curb weight: 8200 kg

Chronology
- Predecessor: Autosan Solina

The Autosan Wetlina is a minibus built on the chassis of the Mercedes-Benz Vario O818D, that was produced between 2008 and 2013.

== History ==
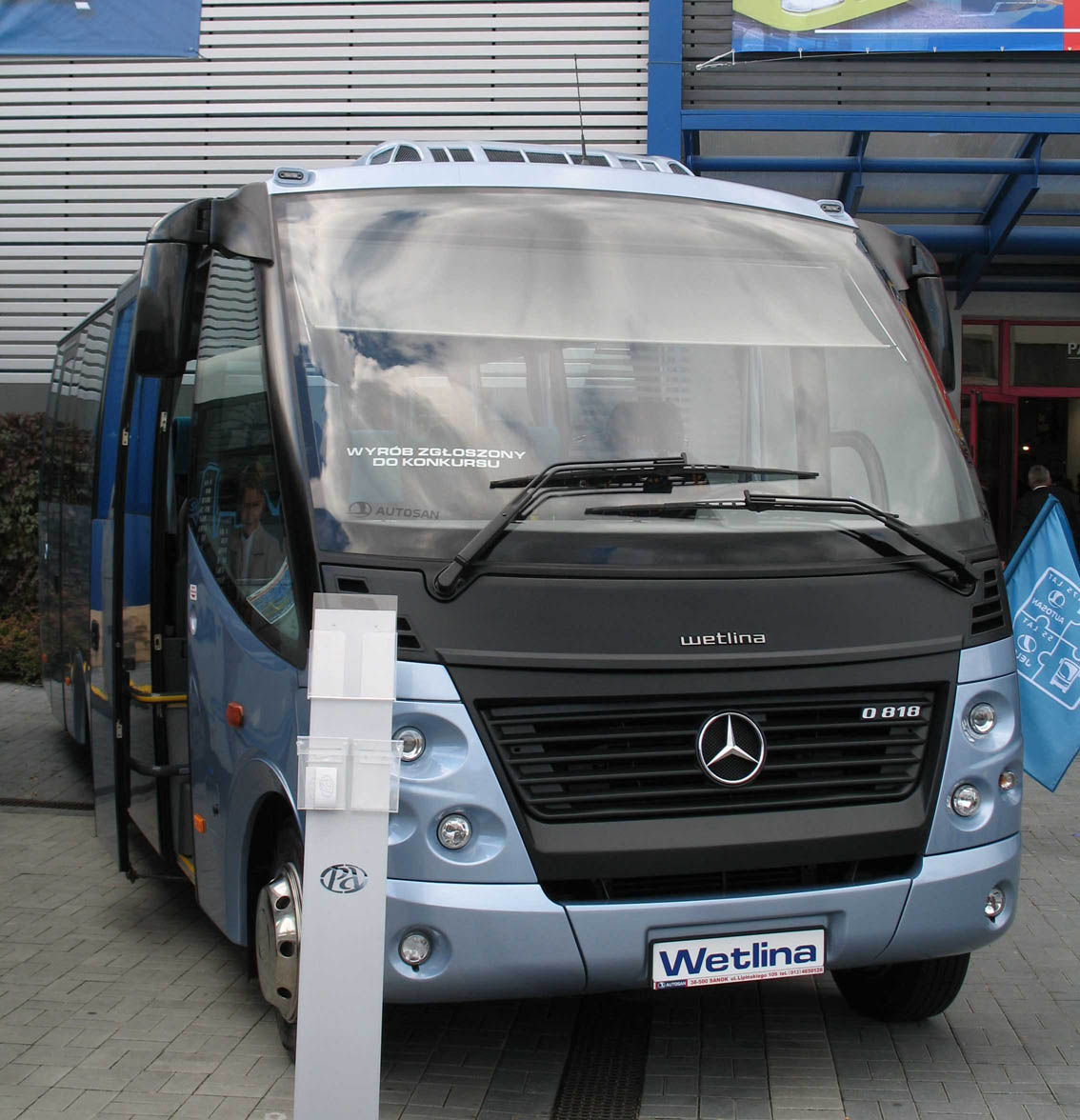
Prototype of the A8V.01.01 Wetlina.

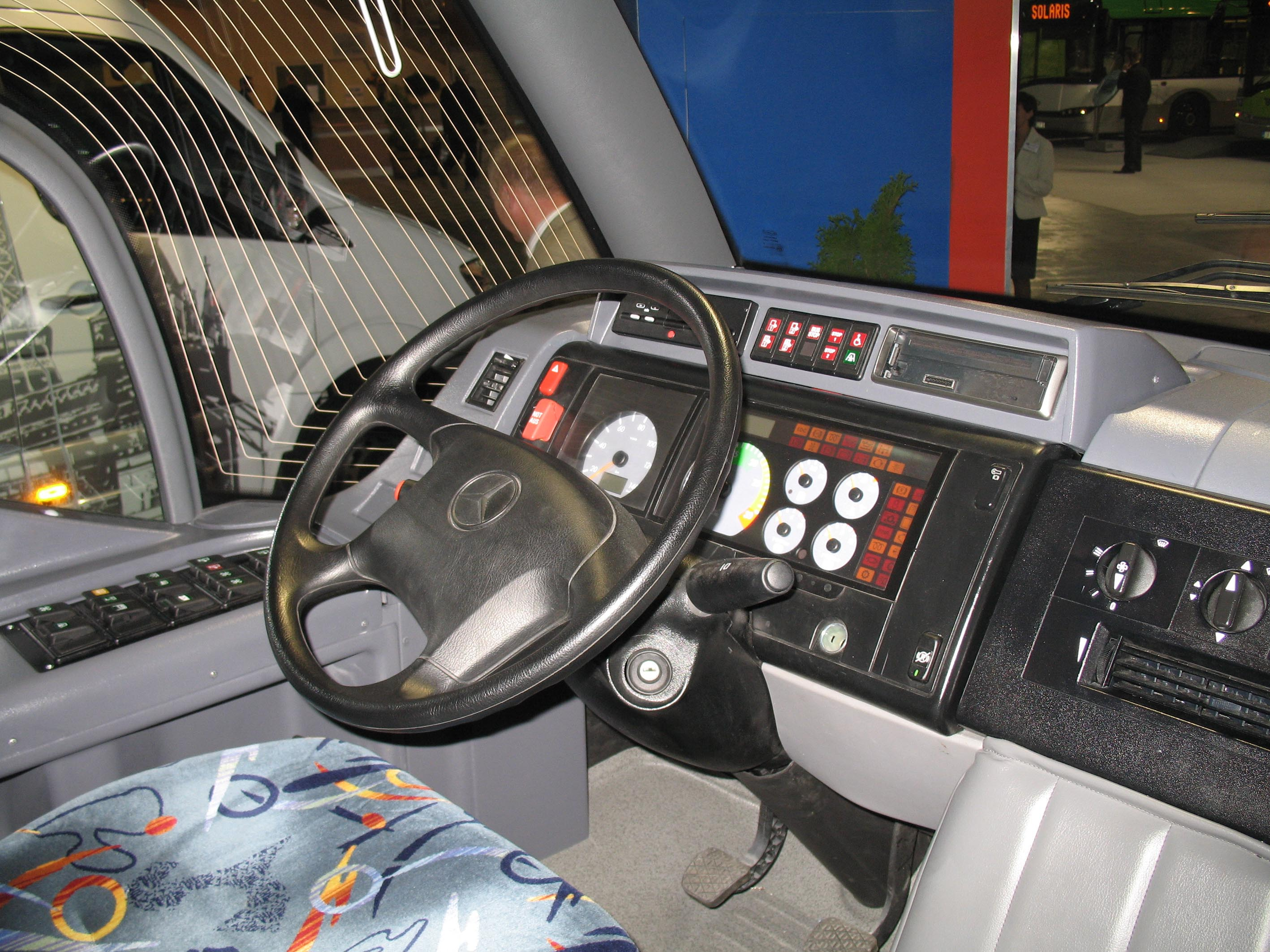
Driver cab in the Autosan Wetlina City.

This model was first presented in 2007 at the Transexpo Trade Fair as a prototype version named A8V.01.01 Wetlina. The following year the company produced a variety of models, the A8V.01.02 (tourist version) and the A8V.01.03 (intercity version). The prototype version was reduced in length by 475 mm, this was done by shortening of the overhang. In September 2008, during the Seven Public Transport Days in Warsaw, and a month later in the Transexpo in 2008 the company presented a variation of an urban Wetlina City (A8V.02.01). This was the new series which the company Autosan had begun to manufacture as they did with their older series of the Autosan Solina. The first units of the minibus were delivered to a company in Sweden. In the third quarter of 2009 the company started producing models with engines that meet the standard of the Euro 5 qualification. The series is sold on the market in the United Kingdom and Ireland, where the minibuses are known as Autosan Osprey. At the end of 2010, the trade name removed the A8V. From that moment, the minibuses are known as Autosan Wetlina and Autosan Wetlina City. In 2011, the Autosan company has made a prisoner transportation bus in the series. The production of the Autosan Wetlina minibus had been stopped in 2013, which was related to the stop in manufacture of the chassis for the Mercedes-Benz Vario.

== Specification ==
The minibuses in the A8V series were built on the chassis of the Mercedes-Benz Vario O818D. The body structure is made of steel tubes with square and rectangular cross-sections, which are joined by welding. The outer structure, is welded to the frame, and is made of corrosion-resistant materials such as stainless steel and plastic. When compared to the previous model the seat next to the driver has been removed, which makes the driver cab very big. With larger dimensions and better built interior layout the minibus can carry more passengers when compared to the Autosan Solina.
