= Autosan =

Bus and coach manufacturer located in Sanok, Poland

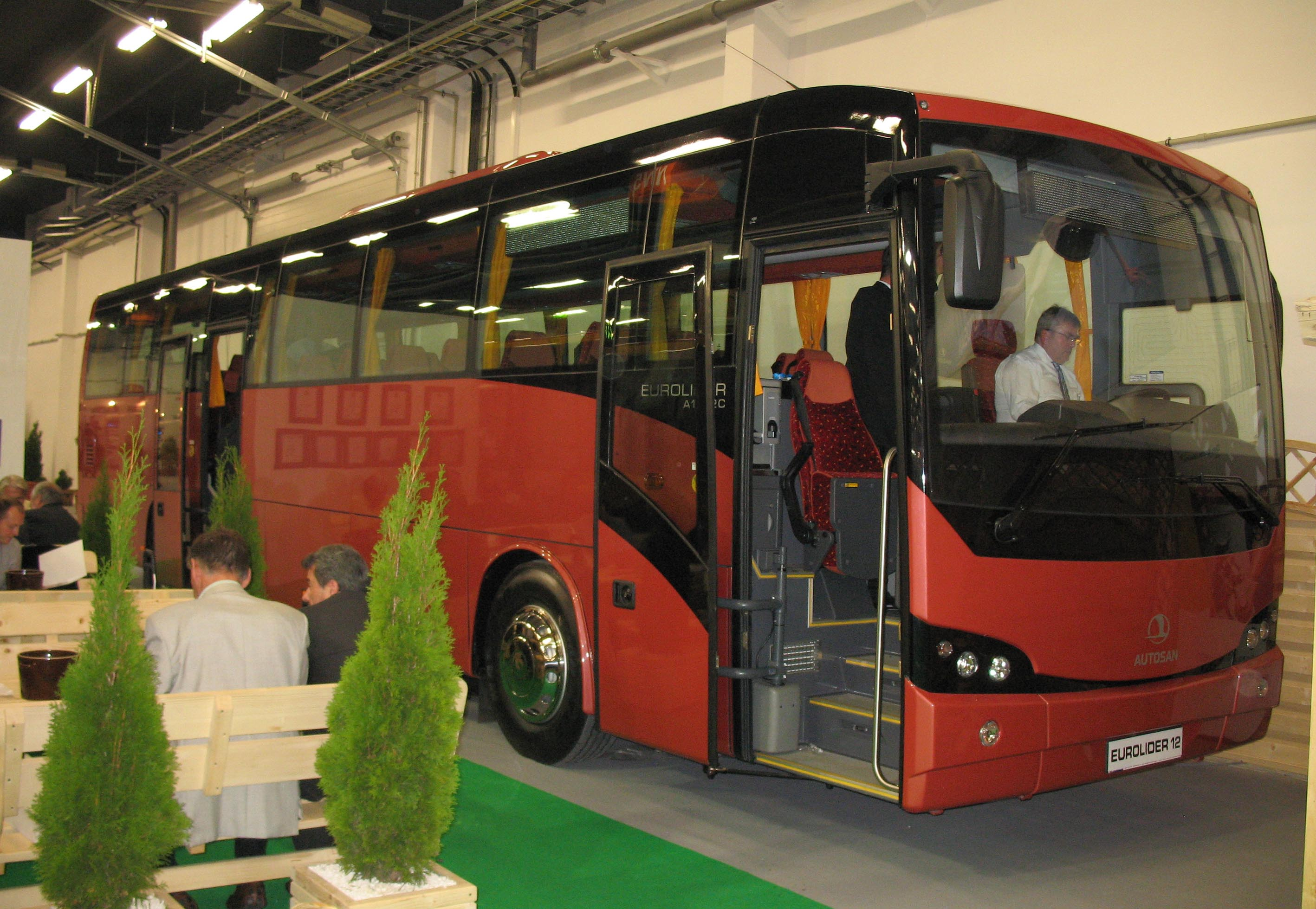
- Industry: Automotive
- Founded: 1832
- Founder: Walenty Lipiński; Mateusz Beksiński
- Headquarters: Sanok, Poland
- Area served: Europe; Africa; Asia
- Key people: Michał Stachura (President of Managing Board)
- Products: Buses
- Parent: Huta Stalowa Wola
- Website: autosan.pl

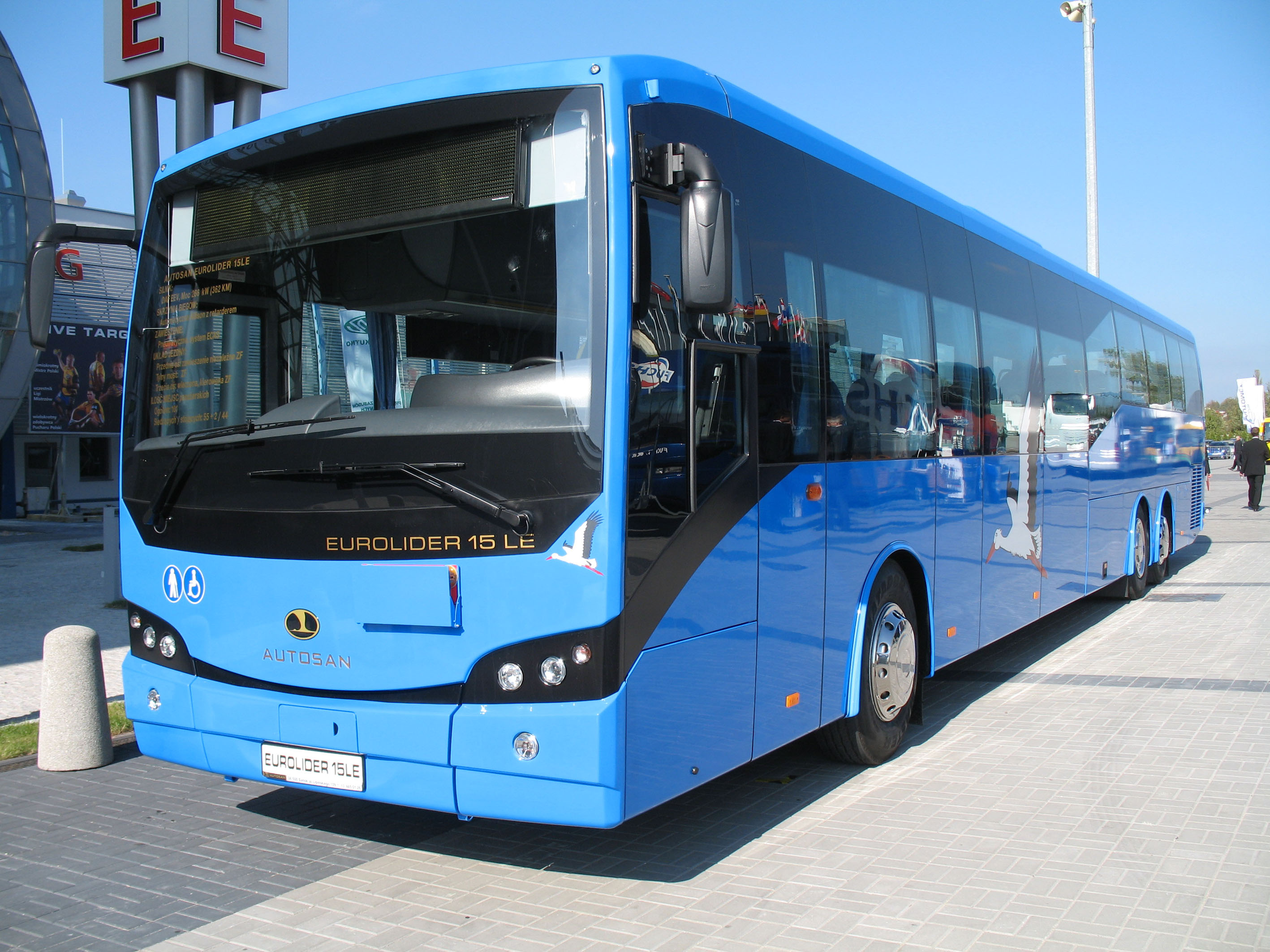
Autosan Eurolider 15 LE - local/intercity low-entry bus

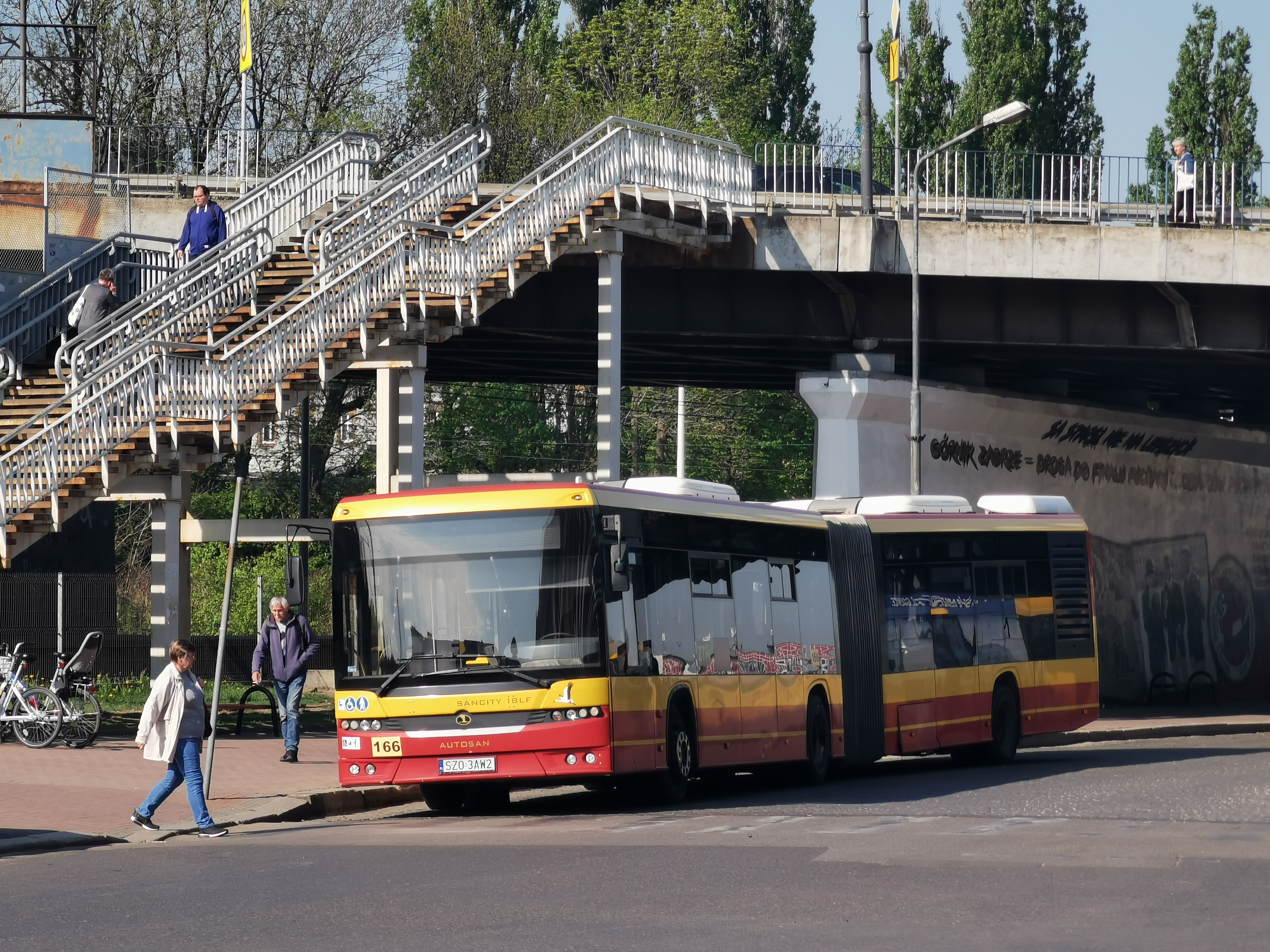
Autosan Sancity M18LF - articulated bus

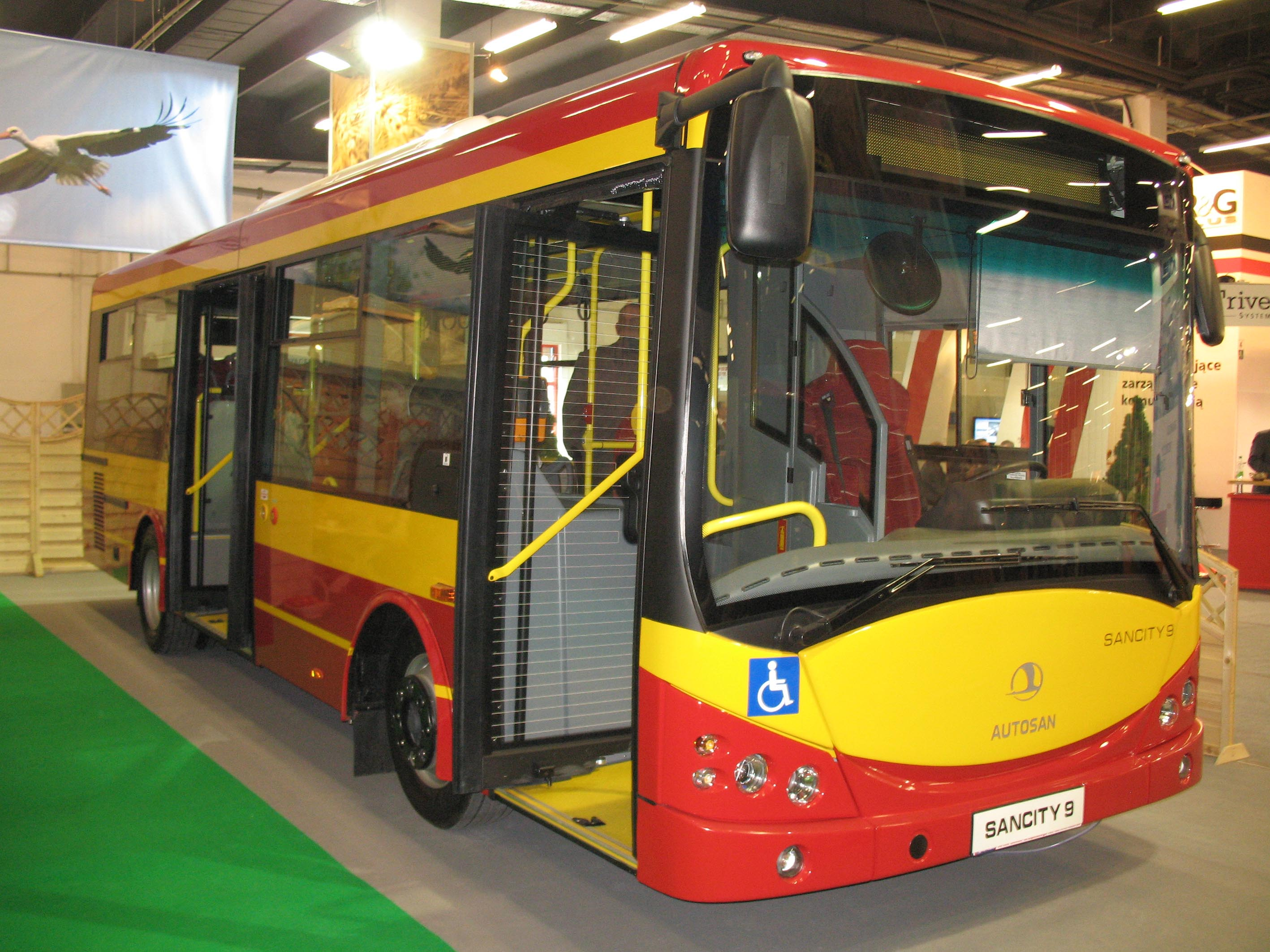
Autosan M09LE Sancity 9 - city bus

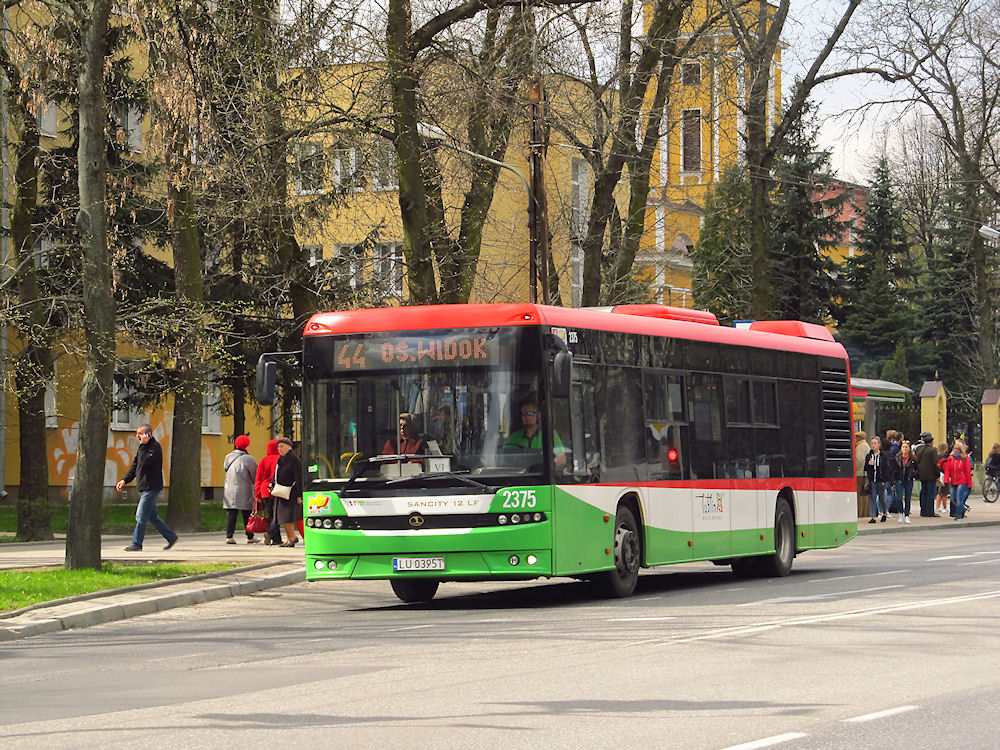
Autosan Sancity 12LF - city bus

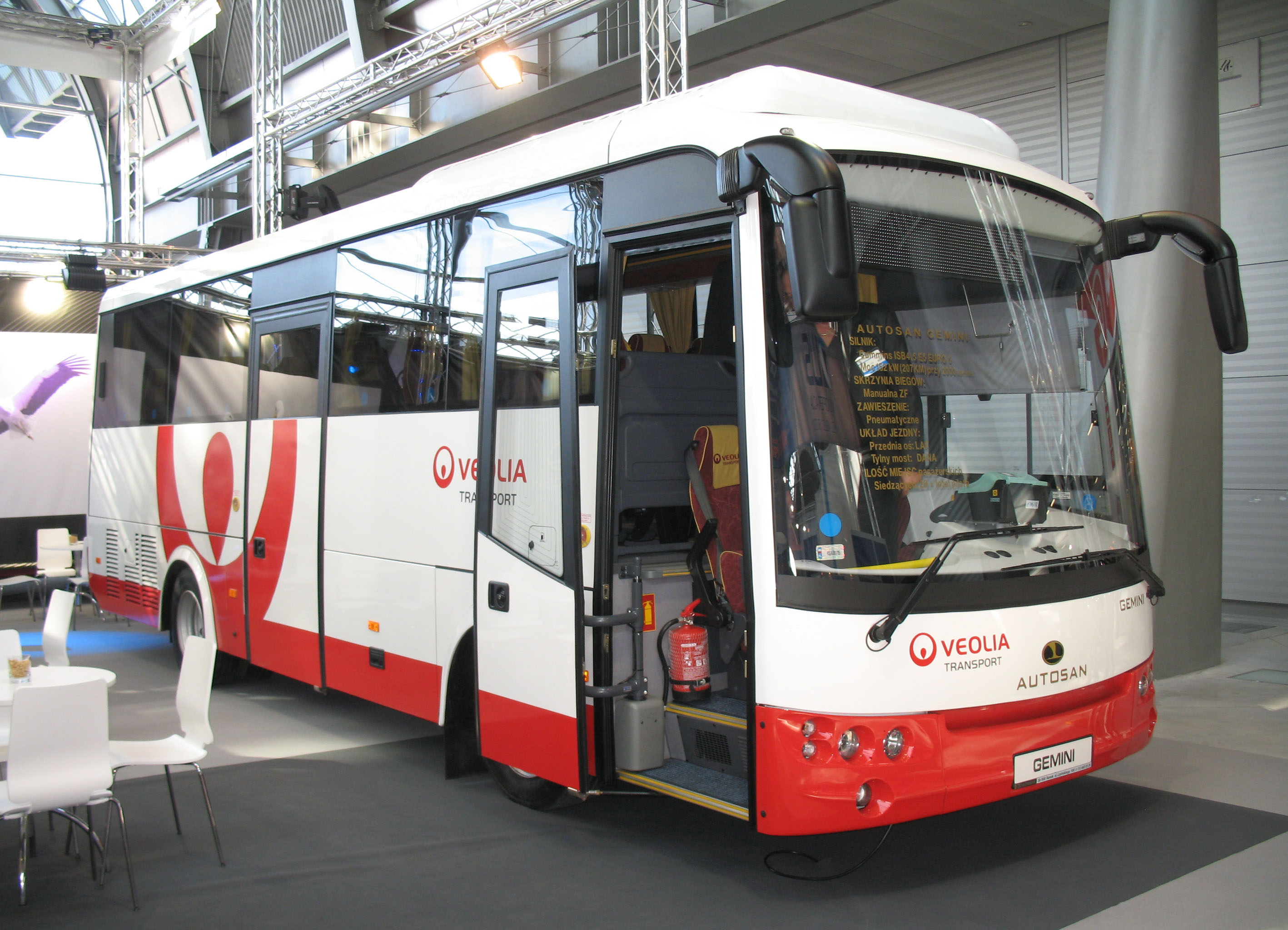
Intercity/tourist coach Autosan Gemini

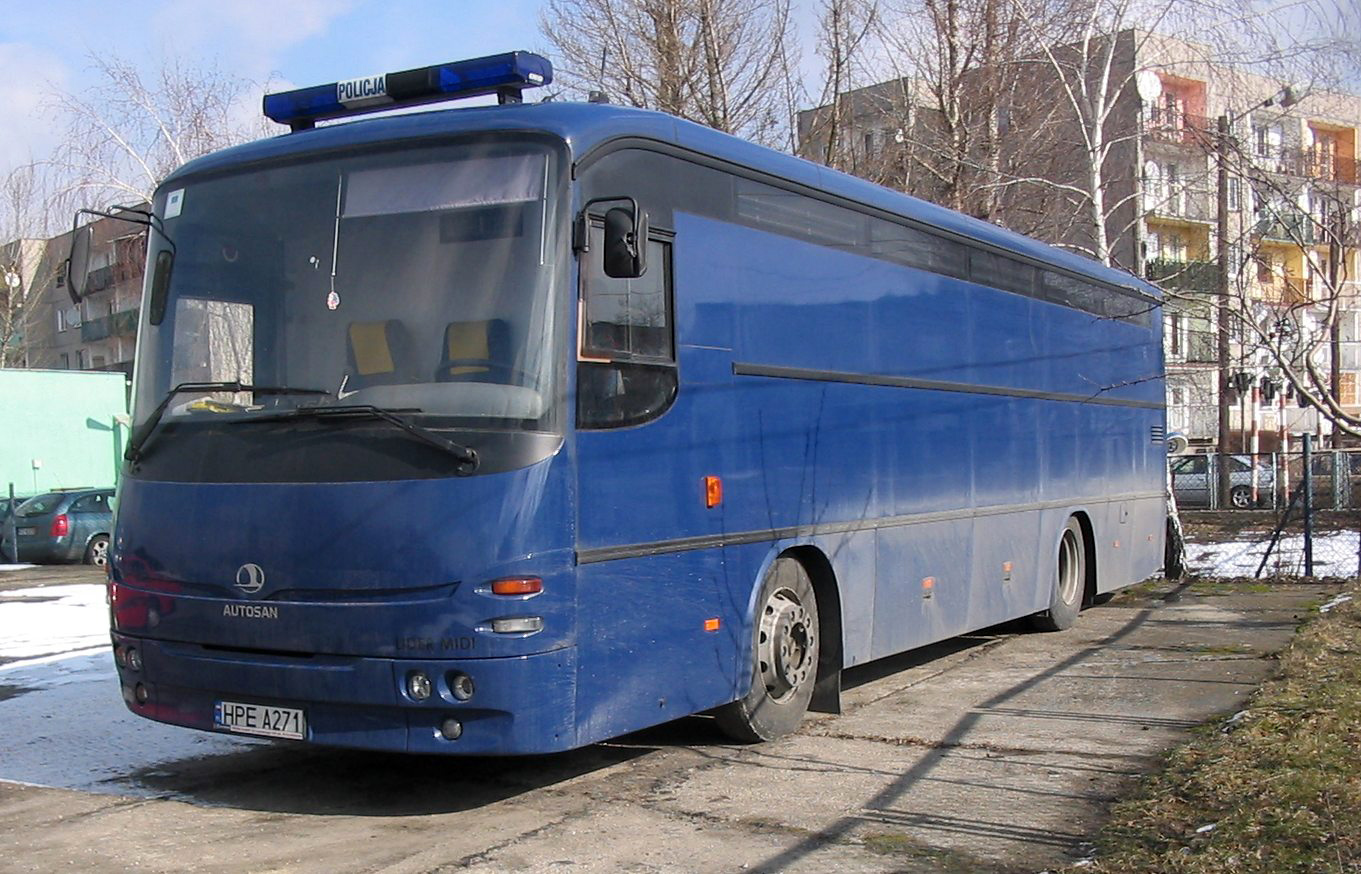
Autosan A1010T DW police bus

Autosan is a Polish bus and coach manufacturer. The company is located in Sanok, Poland. Its sales network includes European (also non-EU countries), African and Asian countries. Currently it produces approximately 300 buses a year.

Since 2022, it has been a branch of the Huta Stalowa Wola company.

== History ==
The company was founded in 1832 by Walenty Lipiński and Mateusz Beksiński as a boilermaker's plant. The history of the factory changed depending on domestic and European economic situations. At the beginning of its activity, the factory produced devices and equipment for the oil mining, distillery and brewing industries. It later added transportation to its range and by 1894 it had become Poland's most important manufacturer of rail coaches and freight cars, tramcars and other high-capacity vehicles, while continuing to produce their initial output of boilers and other related devices. Later, even more variety of product was added, including cisterns, cranes, dredgers, road rollers, steel lifeboats, steel bridge constructions and casting articles.

In 1926, Autosan launched its first lot of buses mounted on Lancia chassis. Activities were interrupted during World War II but resumed in 1950. In 1973, a new family of buses is launched - the H9 bus, with the engine mounted at the rear. It would be followed in 1984 by the high-capacity H10 model.

In September 2013 the Court of Krosno declared the factory bankrupt. In a statement issued at the time it was explained that it was impossible to continue financing the restructuring. A few days later Sobiesław Zasada Group, which owned the company, sold a package of shares in Autosan to Gregory Tarnawa for one Polish zloty. Trade unionists from the factory picketed in front of the former owner, Sobiesław Zasada Group, in Kraków, demanding payment of arrears of salary for several months. The company is still operational.

Since 2001, the company has developed and produced components for rail vehicles, especially the bodies of railcars and trams.

== Products ==
=== Buses ===
==== Current models ====
- Tourist coaches
  - Autosan A0808T Gemini
  - Autosan A1112T Ramzes
- Intercity buses
  - Autosan A0808T Gemini
  - Autosan A0909L Tramp 2 (Autosan Scamp)
  - Autosan A1010T Lider 3
  - Autosan A1012T Lider
  - Autosan Eurolider 9
  - Autosan Eurolider 12
  - Autosan Eurolider 13
  - Autosan Lider 9 eco
  - Autosan Lider 9 eco2
  - Autosan A8V Wetlina (Autosan Osprey)
- Local buses
  - Autosan A1010T Lider 10
  - Autosan H7-20MB Solina
  - Autosan Sancity 9LE
  - Autosan Eurolider 13LE
  - Autosan Eurolider 15LE
- City buses (low-floor and low-entry buses)
  - Sancity 9LE
  - Sancity 10LF
  - Sancity 12LE
  - Sancity 12LF
  - Sancity 18LF
  - Autosan A8V Wetlina City (Autosan Osprey)
- School buses
  - Autosan A0909S Smyk
  - Autosan A1012T Eagle RHD
- Special buses, prison vans
  - Autosan A1010T DW
  - Autosan H7-10ZK
- Police buses for military squads
  - Autosan H7-10I

==== Historical buses ====
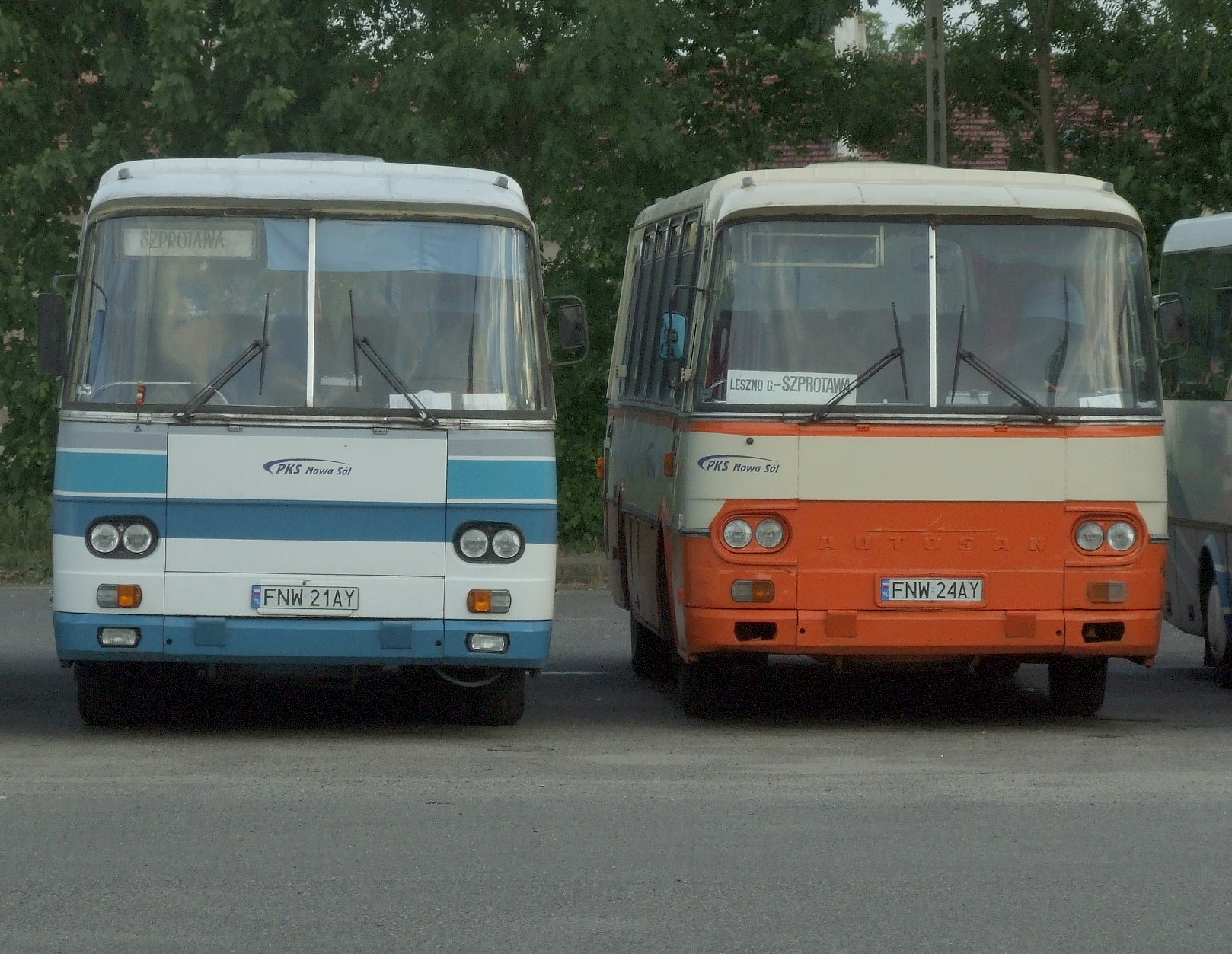
Autosan H9-21, a very long-running and popular model now discontinued. The current A0909 types are still descended from this one

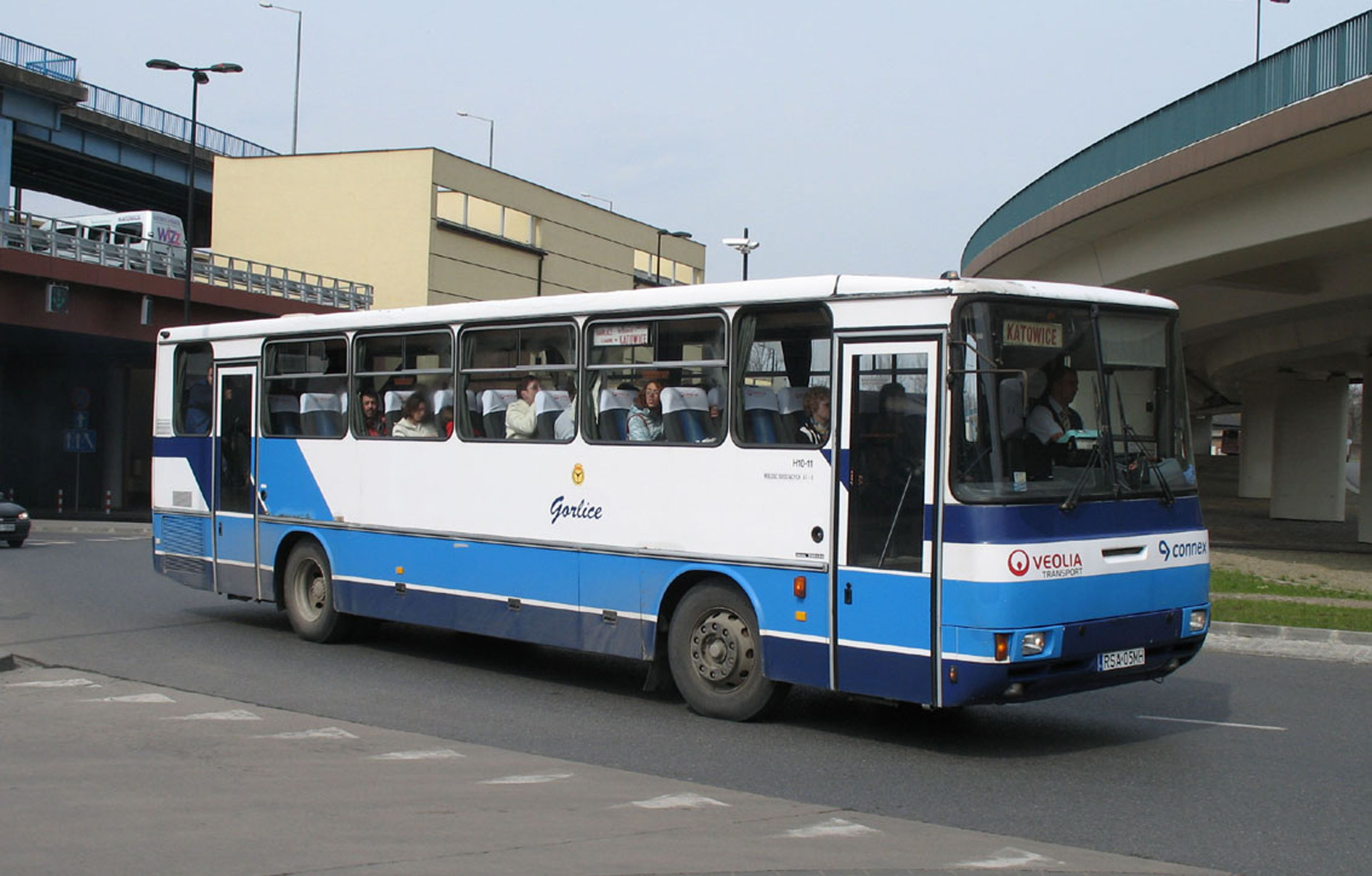
Autosan H10-11, historical bus

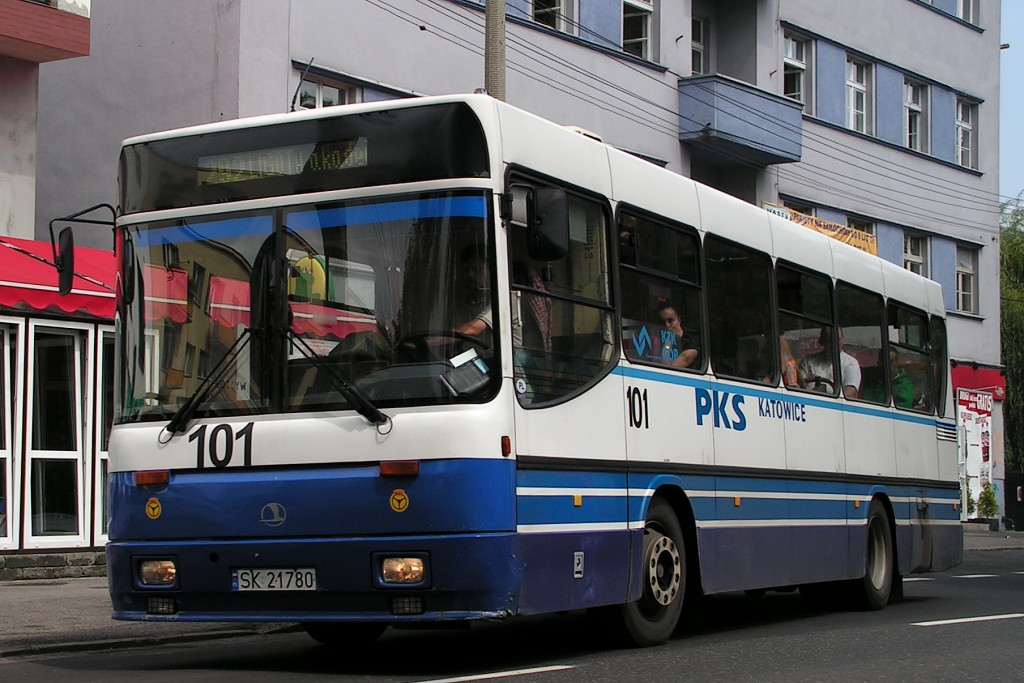
Autosan A1010M "Medium”, historical bus

- Tourist coaches
  - Autosan A404T Cezar
  - Autosan A1112T San
  - Autosan A1112T Sanman
- Intercity buses
  - Autosan H6-10 Melon
  - Autosan A0909L Tramp
  - Autosan H7-10 Traper
  - Autosan H9-xx
  - Autosan H10-xx
  - Autosan A10-10T Lider Midi
- Local buses
  - Autosan A0808MN Sancity
  - Autosan H7-20 Trafic
- City buses
  - Autosan H9-33
  - Autosan H9-35
  - Autosan A1010M Medium
- School buses
  - Autosan H6-10.03S Żaczek
  - Autosan H9-21 Kleks
  - Autosan H10-10S Urwis
- Special buses, prison vans
  - Autosan H6-56 Towos
  - Autosan H6-10 SW

=== Others ===
- Rail buses
- Passenger trailers
- Containers
- Special coachworks
- Components

== See also ==
- Jelcz SA
