= Autosan H10 =

Series of buses

Autosan H10-10 Autosan H10-11 Autosan H10-12
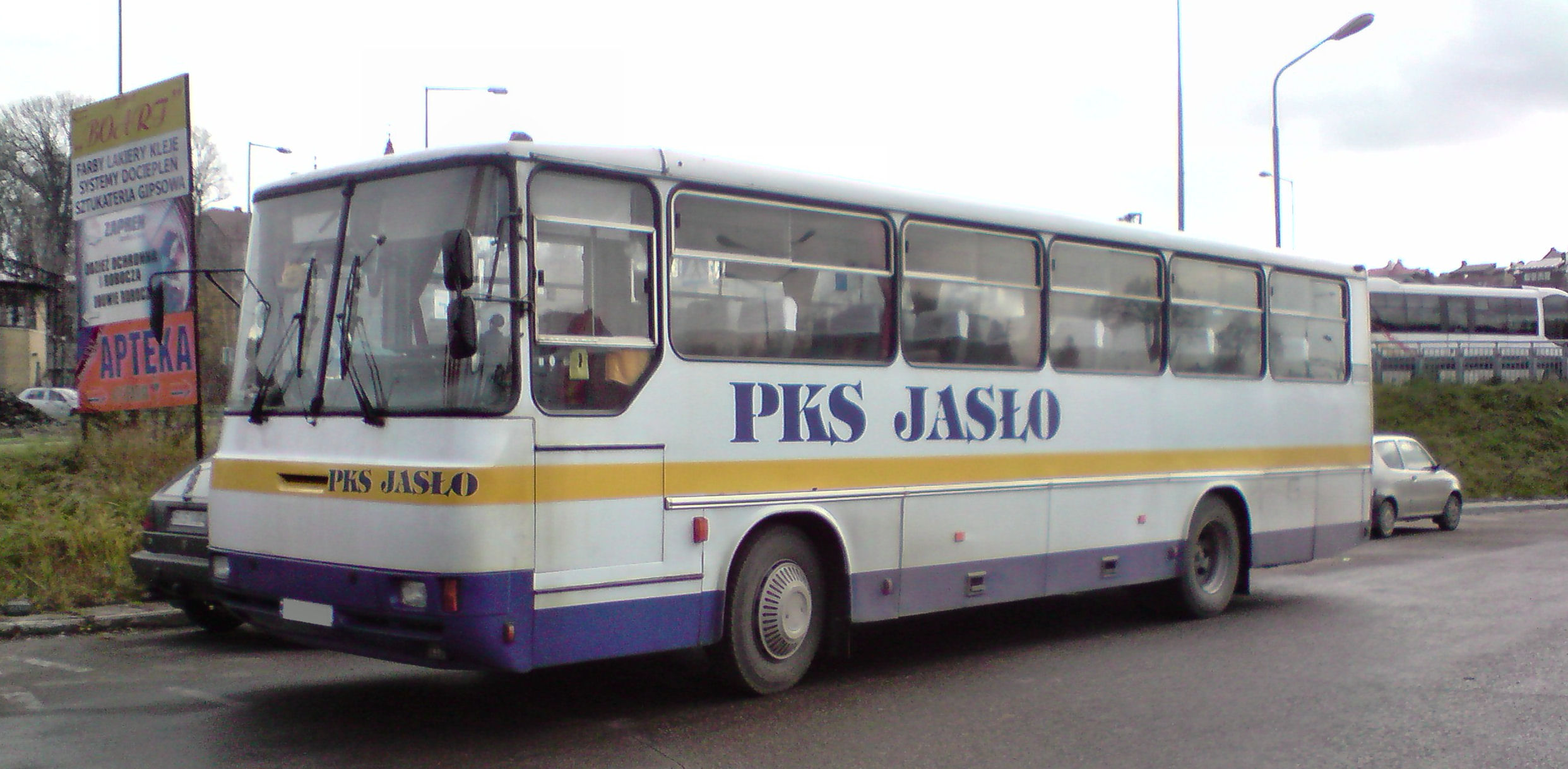
- Autosan H10-10 Midi

Overview
- Manufacturer: Autosan
- Also called: Granus H10-11
- Production: 1992–2003 (H10-10); 1984–2003 (H10-11); 1990–2000 (H10-12)
- Assembly: Sanok; Zvolen

Body and chassis
- Body style: midi or maxi class bus
- Doors: 2 or 3

Powertrain
- Engine: H10-10; 1) Andoria 6cT107-2/A1/3; 2) Renault MIDR 06.02.26W; 3) Renault MIDR 06.02.26W4; H10-11; 1) WS Mielec SW 680/95/2; 2) TAM F6L-413FR; 3) TAM F8L-413F; 4) WS Mielec SWT 11/311/2; 5) Steyr WD 615.50; 6) MAN D0826 LOH; 7) MB OM 401 LA; H10-12; 1) TAM F8L-413F; 2) WS Mielec SWT 11/311/2; 3) Cummins LT-B250; 4) Cummins LTA10-B290; 5) MB OM 401 LA
- Transmission: TS4-95 (H10-11.11B); S5-60 (H10-10); Famos 5MS-6024 (H10-11.13); S6-90 (H10-11/H10-12); TS6-120 (H10-11.11BM)

Dimensions
- Wheelbase: 5,000 mm (200 in) (H10-10); 5,425 mm (213.6 in) (H10-11); 6,085 mm (239.6 in) (H10-12)
- Length: 10,380 mm (409 in) (H10-10); 10,435 mm (410.8 in) (H10-10.02 Midi); 11,200 mm (440 in) (H10-11); 11,860 mm (467 in) (H10-12)
- Width: 2,500 mm (98 in)
- Height: 3,080 mm (121 in) (H10-10); 3,085 mm (121.5 in) (H10-11.11/.21); 3,160 mm (124 in) (H10-11.01); 3,182 mm (125.3 in) (H10-12.16 Inter)
- Curb weight: 13,000 kg (29,000 lb) (H10-10); 16,000 kg (35,000 lb) (H10-11/H10-12); 18,700 kg (41,200 lb) (H10-11.11B)

Autosan H10 is a series of midi or maxi-class city, local, and intercity buses produced between 1984 and 2003, initially by the Sanok Bus Factory and later by Autosan in Sanok.

The H10 series was originally developed to replace the aging H9 family in the midi-class intercity and city bus segment. In the first half of the 1980s, the concept for the new generation of buses was revised, leading to the continued development of suburban and intercity maxi-class buses under the designations H10-11 and H10-12. These models supplemented the factory's product lineup rather than directly replacing the H9-20 and H9-21 models. The idea of replacing the Autosan H9 family with a midi-class bus derived from the H10 series was revisited only in the late 1980s, resulting in the H10-10 model, which was introduced into production in 1992. Due to its significantly higher purchase price compared to older-generation buses, the Autosan H10-10 was produced in fewer units than the H9-20 and H9-21 and ultimately did not replace them in the lineup. From the second half of the 1990s, the H10 series was gradually phased out in favor of new models from the A10 family (Autosan A1010T, Autosan A1012T).

== History ==
=== Origins ===
In the second half of the 1970s, the Sanok Bus Factory offered only models from the H9 series, which had been developed between the late 1960s and early 1970s. Despite numerous modernizations and the introduction of new variants, these vehicles were not considered technically advanced enough to compete with models offered by rival manufacturers. As a result, work began on developing a new series of buses, leading to the construction of the Autosan H9/II city bus in 1978 and its unified intercity counterpart, the H9/III.

The design of the Autosan H9/II and H9/III was based on solutions from the older H9 series, but the prototype buses featured an entirely new 10-meter-long body. The city variant was equipped with four pairs of electro-pneumatically operated double doors, providing access to an interior designed to accommodate 91 passengers, including 23 seated. The intercity version had a 2-0-1 door configuration, with the front-mounted doors being double-leaf and electro-pneumatically operated. Its passenger capacity was 45, all seated. Both prototypes were powered by an Andoria 6CT107 engine, produced by the Diesel Engine Factory in Andrychów. This engine had a displacement of 6,540 cm^{3} and a maximum power output of 121 kW (165 hp). Due to the short rear overhang of the prototype vehicles, the engine was mounted transversely, which required the designers to incorporate an angular gearbox developed by the Industrial Institute of Motorization. This gearbox connected the engine to a five-speed manual S5-45 transmission.

In 1980, a decision was made to continue developing the new bus series. The upcoming models were expected to introduce significantly more changes compared to the older H9 series than those seen in the initial two prototypes presented in 1978.

=== First prototypes ===
The first prototype of the H10 series, designated H10-20.01, was presented in 1981. The chassis of this vehicle was largely unified with the Autosan H9-20 and H9-21; however, it was powered by a turbocharged WSW Andoria 6CT107 engine, which was still in the testing phase at the time. This engine had a displacement of 6,540 cm^{3} and a maximum power output of 125 kW (170 hp). It was paired with a five-speed manual S5-45 gearbox produced by FPS in Tczew. The rigid front axle and drive axle were supplied by FSC Star, and these components were mounted on leaf springs. The body of the H10-20.01 prototype featured many external elements borrowed from the Jelcz PR110U, such as headlights, rear lights, and windshield wipers. The right side of the bus had a pneumatically controlled single-leaf front door operated by the driver, while the rear door was manually opened. The prototype was designed to transport 45 passengers in individual seats.

A year later, additional prototypes of this series were developed. The first was the Autosan H10-20.02, which differed from the ".01" variant by having double-leaf front doors, a drive axle with a lower gear ratio, and a reduced seating capacity of 43, with different types of seats. This prototype was also the first "Autosan H10" unit to be sold, purchased by the ZT Sanok company.

The second prototype built in 1982 was the Autosan H10-21. This model was equipped with a Yugoslavian six-cylinder V-type diesel engine, the TAM F6L-413FR, with a displacement of approximately 9.5 liters and a maximum power output of 141 kW (192 hp). This engine was coupled with a five-speed manual Famos 5MS-6024 gearbox. Both prototypes were showcased at the Poznań International Fair in 1982.

== Autosan H10-11 ==
=== Development ===
In the first half of the 1980s, the development plans for the new series of buses were revised, resulting in the continuation of work on maxi-class vehicles with lengths of 11 and 12 meters. In 1983, two 11-meter prototypes of intercity buses were built. The first of these was designated H10-51 and was equipped with the TAM F6L-413FR engine, which had a maximum power output of 141 kW (192 hp). This engine was paired with a five-speed manual Famos 5MS-6024 gearbox. The chassis featured a front axle and rear rigid axle from TAM, suspended on leaf springs. The second prototype was the Autosan H10-53, which used a Polish Andoria 6CT107 engine with a power output of 125 kW (170 hp), coupled with a five-speed manual S5-45 gearbox. The suspension of this prototype also featured TAM axles but was based on parabolic leaf springs, further supported by stabilizers.

The design was created in cooperation with the Military University of Technology, the Tadeusz Kościuszko Kraków University of Technology, and component suppliers. The head of the team responsible for preparing the new family of buses was Professor Bohdan Lisowski from the Faculty of Architecture at the Kraków University of Technology. Other key team members included Edward Pajęcki (chassis designer), Władysław Majda (chief designer), Jerzy Potocki (director's representative for new launches, son of Stanisław Potocki), and Eugeniusz Paszkiewicz (bodywork design supervisor). The H10 model was presented during a scientific session held in Sanok on 6– 7 October 1982 as part of the 150th anniversary celebrations of the factory.

In 1984, the decision was made to start the production of the intercity H10-11 model as the first representative of the new series of Sanok buses. At that time, two additional prototypes were created, similar to the vehicles that would go into serial production. These prototypes featured bodies extended by nearly 20 cm compared to the H10-51 and H10-53.

=== Mass-produced models ===
==== Autosan H10-11.01/.02/.13/.14 ====
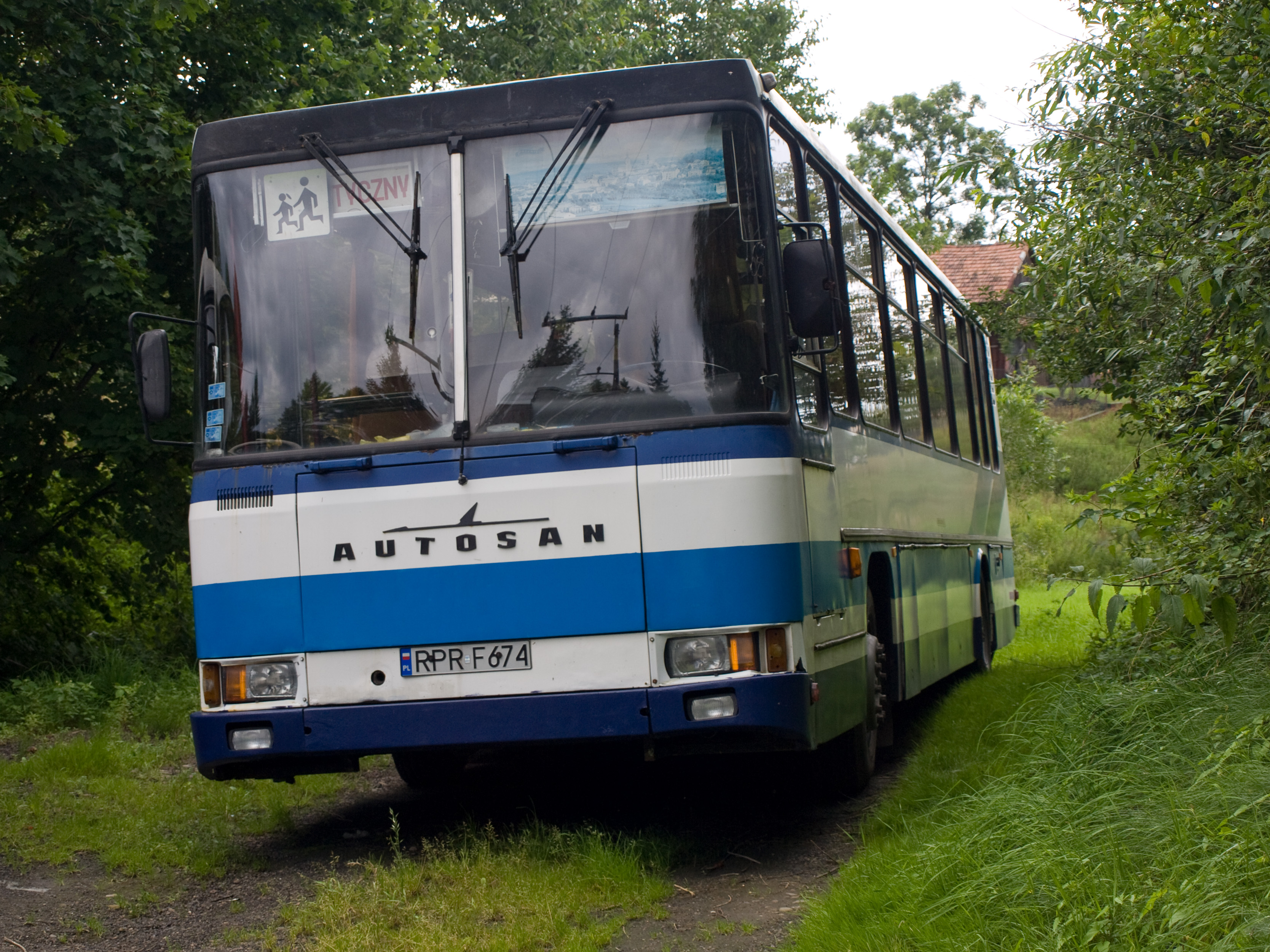
Autosan H10-11 (1984–1991)

At the end of 1984, a pilot series of 10 units of the Autosan H10-11 was produced. The official handover of these buses took place on 18 December 1984 at the "Autosan" Training and Development Center in Sanok. Serial production was launched the following year, initially offering two intercity variants: H10-11.01 and H10-11.02. Both models were powered by a six-cylinder, inline SW680/95/21 diesel engine with a displacement of 11,100 cm^{3}, delivering a maximum power of 136 kW (185 hp) at 2,200 rpm and a peak torque of 706 Nm at 1,500 rpm. This engine was paired with a six-speed manual transmission (S6-90), enabling the bus to reach a top speed of 107 km/h. The production models featured a body length of 11.2 meters and accommodated 47 seated passengers. The chassis used a rigid front axle from Rába (for the .01 variant) or Jelcz (for the .02 variant), while the rear rigid axle was sourced from Rába. Both axles were mounted on air suspension.

Due to supply issues with engines from the Mielec Engine Plant and transmissions from Tczew, the decision was made to import powertrains from Yugoslavia. The suppliers were TAM for engines and Famos for transmissions. In 1986, the H10-11.13 model was introduced, featuring an air-cooled V6 engine (TAM F6L-413FR) with a displacement of approximately 9.6 dm^{3} and a maximum power of 141 kW (192 hp). Power was transmitted through a five-speed manual Famos 5MS-6024 gearbox. As the power output of the V6 engine proved insufficient, the H10-11.14 version was introduced in 1987, equipped with a more powerful air-cooled V8 engine (TAM F8L-413F) with a displacement of about 12.8 dm^{3} and a maximum power of 188 kW (256 hp). This engine was coupled with a six-speed manual S6-90 gearbox, manufactured in Poland under a ZF license. The upgraded engine significantly improved the vehicle's performance, increasing its top speed to 121 km/h. The .14 variant was also available in a touring version, featuring passenger compartment air conditioning. TAM engines were used in the H10 series models until 1992.

==== Autosan H10-11.05/.06 ====
In 1984, prototypes of the Autosan H10-11 variants designed for suburban transport were introduced. The H10-11.05 and H10-11.06 models featured a body equipped with three pairs of doors in a 2-2-2 configuration, with the middle doors being wider than the front and rear ones and opening inward. Corresponding modifications were also made to the interior, which was adapted to carry 75 passengers, including 42 seated. Like the intercity version, these models were powered by the SW680/95/21 engine, producing 136 kW (185 hp), paired with a six-speed S6-90 manual transmission. The suspension system included an air-sprung front axle from Rába (for the .05 variant) or Jelcz (for the .06 variant) and a rigid rear drive axle from Rába. The suburban versions did not gain popularity with PKS operators, leading to the production of only 20 units in 1985.

==== Autosan H10-11.11/.11N/.21 ====
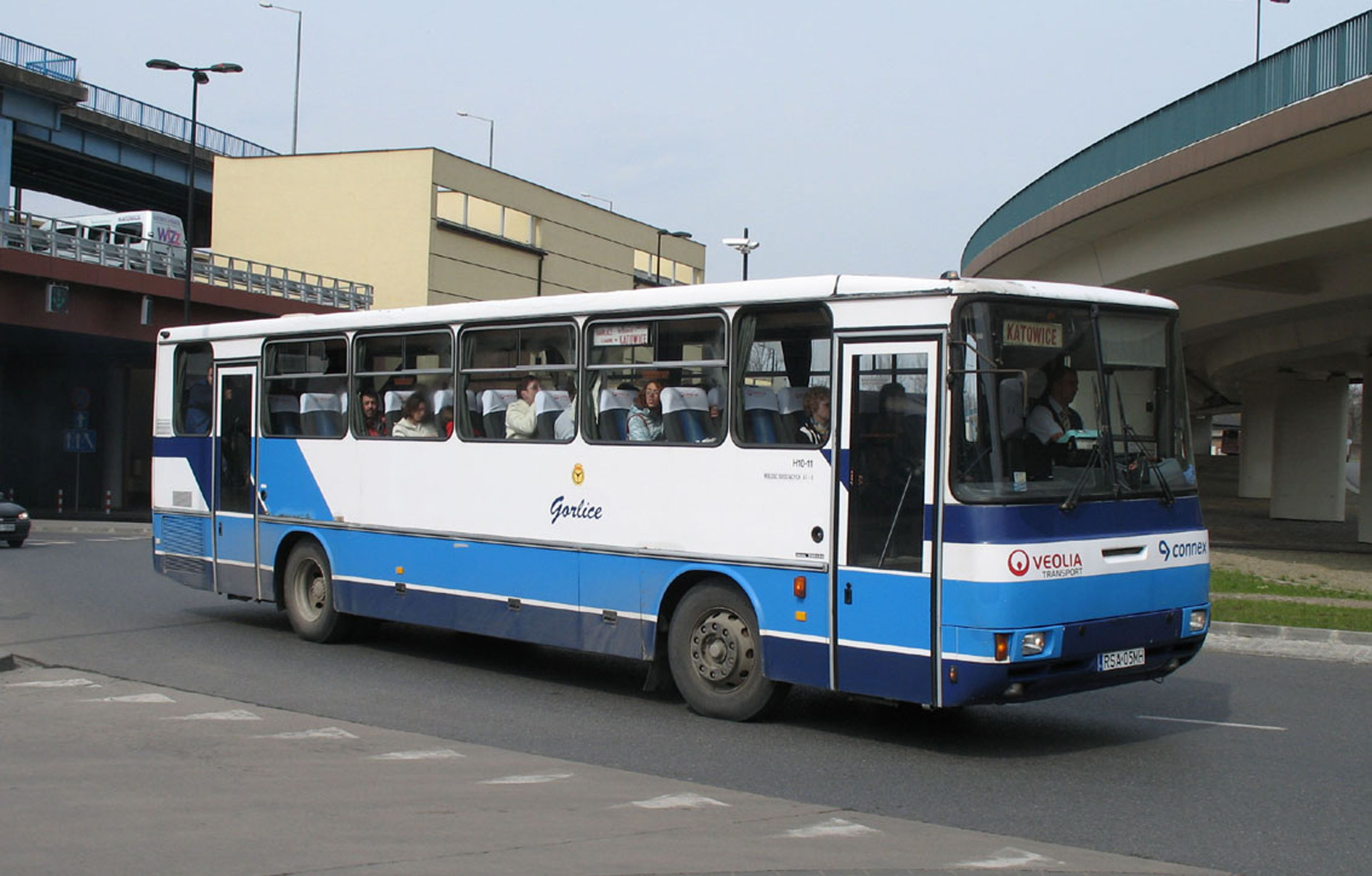
Autosan H10-11.21 (1996–2003)

With the introduction of the Autosan H10-12 into mass production in 1990, the intercity version of the H10-11 was gradually phased out, remaining in the production program until 1992. As a result, in 1991, suburban and local variants of this model, designated H10-11.11 and H10-11.21, were introduced. These versions differed in interior configuration and door layout. The .11 variant had a 1-2-1 door arrangement, making it suitable for urban routes as well. It had a passenger capacity of 77, with 37 seated. The .21 variant featured a 1-0-1 door configuration, designed for longer-distance routes, with the same total passenger capacity of 77 but with 47 seated.

With the introduction of these suburban versions, a modernization of the H10 series' body design took place, inspired by the prototypes of the smaller Autosan H10-10 from the early 1990s. The front end was redesigned without a hatch, plastic bumpers were introduced, and the rear lights were replaced with square ones from Ikarus 200-series buses. The roofline at the front was lowered, while the upper edge of the side windows was raised. The suspension system was also improved by increasing the spacing of the air springs, enhancing the vehicle's handling characteristics. The suburban H10-11 models were powered by a six-cylinder, inline diesel engine of the SW680 type with a displacement of 11,100 cm^{3} and a maximum output of 148 kW (202 hp) or its turbocharged variant, the SWT 11/311/23, delivering 176 kW (240 hp). These engines were paired with a six-speed manual transmission of the S6-90 type.

In 1995, a new single-panel design was introduced for the front and rear doors. That same year, the H10-11.11N model was introduced as a variant of the .21 type, adapted for transporting wheelchair users. It featured a lift accessed through manually operated outward-opening doors located between the axles. The interior was modified to accommodate two wheelchairs and 65 passengers, including 35 seated. A more extensive modernization followed in 1996. New front and rear sections with bonded glass panels made of plastic were introduced, along with new aluminum doors. A two-door version of the .11 subtype, featuring a 1-2-0 door layout, was added to the lineup. After this update, the models were renamed:

- Autosan H10-11.21 Local
- Autosan H10-11.11 Local 2 (two-door version)
- Autosan H10-11.11 Local 3 (three-door version)

The modernized versions were powered by a six-cylinder, inline diesel engine of the SWT 11/311/2 type, with a displacement of 11,100 cm^{3}, a maximum output of 176 kW (240 hp) at 2,200 rpm, and a peak torque of 902 Nm at 1,500 rpm. The Autosan H10-11 Local had a top speed of 112 km/h. From 1997, an optional rear drive axle manufactured by FON Radomsko was introduced as an alternative to the Rába component. Ultimately, the production of the Autosan H10-11 series ended in 2003.

==== Autosan H10-11.11B/.11BM ====
In 1996, another variant of the H10-11 series was introduced, the Autosan H10-11.11B, a city bus designed primarily to meet the demand for large-capacity urban buses in the Russian market, where over 300 units of this model were exported.

The H10-11.11B featured three pairs of doors arranged in a 2-2-1 configuration, operated electro-pneumatically from the driver's seat. The interior was designed to accommodate 123 passengers, with 21 seats. The engine configuration met Euro 2 emissions standards, featuring a six-cylinder, inline, turbocharged Steyr WD 615.50 diesel engine with a displacement of approximately 9.7 dm^{3}, delivering 201 kW (273 hp) at 2,200 rpm and a peak torque of 1,110 Nm at 1,450 rpm. Alternatively, a six-cylinder MAN D0826 LOH engine with a displacement of 6.87 dm^{3} was used, producing 191 kW (260 HP) at 2,300 rpm and 1,100 Nm of torque at 1,350–1,700 rpm. Both engines were paired with a four-speed manual transmission, the TS4-95. The H10-11.11B had a top speed of approximately 70 km/h.

In 1997, the H10-11.11BM version was introduced, equipped with a Mercedes-Benz OM401LA engine, producing 213 kW (290 hp), and mated to a six-speed manual transmission, the TS6-120.

==== Autosan H10-11.08 ====
In 1990, a prototype bus was developed and built for urban and suburban routes, designated Autosan H10-11.08. This model featured an unusual door arrangement of 1-2-2-1, with single-leaf front and rear doors and two pairs of double-leaf middle doors. The primary customers for this version of the H10 series were transportation companies from the Soviet Union. The bus was powered by a six-cylinder SW680/95/21 engine, delivering a maximum output of 136 kW (185 hp).

==== Autosan H10-11.19 ====
In 1990, at the request of the Curtis International music group, a special, luxurious version of the Autosan H10-11 intercity model was created. The H10-11.19 variant featured several high-end equipment elements that significantly enhanced passenger comfort. These included air conditioning for the passenger space (provided by Webasto), an Audio-Video system with individual headphone inputs, a toilet, and a cloakroom. The interior was finished with fabric upholstery and designed to accommodate 25 passengers, 24 of whom had adjustable backrest seats by Vogel, with an additional pilot seat.

The bus' body underwent modifications, the main change being the raised lower line of the side windows. Additionally, the front doors were from the Bode brand, and the bus featured electrically adjustable external mirrors taken from Mercedes-Benz models, as well as halogen headlights with H4 bulbs. Two fuel tanks, each with a capacity of 160 liters, were also installed. The H10-11.19 was powered by an air-cooled, V8 engine TAM F8L-413F, with a displacement of approximately 12.8 dm^{3} and a maximum output of 188 kW (256 hp). This engine was coupled with a 6-speed manual gearbox S6-90.

== Autosan H10-12 ==
=== Development ===
After changing the development plans for the H10 series, work continued on a longer 12-meter vehicle, which would serve as the flagship model in the manufacturer's offer. In 1983, in addition to the two buses H10-51 and H10-53, a third prototype was built, labeled H10-12.01, which reflected the bus' length. The extended body of the bus was designed to transport 50 passengers seated. The bus was powered by a 6-cylinder, inline diesel engine SW680/95/2 with a displacement of 11,100 cm^{3} and a maximum power of 136 kW (185 hp). The power was transmitted through a 6-speed manual transmission, type S6-90. In the suspension system, a pneumatic suspension with independent front axle from the Jelcz PR110 bus and a rigid rear drive axle from Rába were used.

In 1985, two more prototypes of this version were built, labeled H10-12.03 and H10-12.06. These vehicles were similarly equipped to the 1983 model but used a rigid front axle from Rába. Later on, these buses were fitted with various alternative components for testing purposes, such as the TAM F8L-413F engine, a turbocharged engine WS Mielec with 176 kW (240 hp), or a rigid front axle from the Soviet company LiAZ.

=== Mass-produced models ===
==== Autosan H10-12.03/.04 ====
Despite the development of the H10-12 model in the 1980s, these vehicles did not find buyers among PKS enterprises, mainly due to their competitive nature compared to the slightly shorter Autosan H10-11. As a result, serial production of this variant of the H10 family began only in 1990. At the International Poznań International Fair, two buses were presented, labeled H10-12.03 and H10-12.04. The first one was equipped with a Yugoslavian, air-cooled, V8 engine TAM F8L-413F, with a displacement of around 12.8 dm^{3} and a maximum power of 188 kW (256 hp). The drive system of the H10-12.04 used a turbocharged engine from WS Mielec, with a power output of 176 kW (240 hp).

==== Autosan H10-12.14/.16/.18/.21/.25 ====
At the turn of 1990 and 1991, a modernization of the H10 series vehicles was carried out. Changes to the body included a modified front wall, with the removal of the previously used flap. The new bumpers were made of plastic, and square rear lights from the Ikarus series 200 buses were adopted. The roofline at the front of the body was lowered, and the upper edge of the side window line was raised. The suspension system was upgraded by increasing the distance between the pneumatic bellows, improving the bus' driving characteristics. The primary engine used in the modernized H10-12 buses was a 6-cylinder, in-line diesel engine type SWT 11/311/2, with a displacement of 11,100 cm^{3}, a maximum power of 176 kW (240 hp) at 2,200 rpm, and a maximum torque of 902 Nm at 1,500 rpm. This engine was paired with a 6-speed manual gearbox S6-90. The suspension consisted of a front axle and a rigid rear axle from Rába, suspended on pneumatic bellows, steel springs, and telescopic shock absorbers, further supported by a tilt stabilizer.

In 1991, the tourist model H10-12.18 was introduced, equipped with a 6-cylinder, in-line diesel engine from the American company Cummins. The engine type LT10-B250 had a displacement of around 10 dm^{3}, a maximum power of 186 kW (253 hp) at 1,900 rpm, and a maximum torque of 980 Nm at 1,300 rpm. It was paired with a S6-90 gearbox. The following year, the H10-12.21 variant was added to the offer, featuring a more powerful Cummins engine, type LTA10-B290, with a maximum power of 212 kW (288 hp) at 2,100 rpm and a torque of 1,163 Nm at 1,300 rpm. Another version, the H10-12.25, was equipped with a 6-cylinder, in-line diesel engine Mercedes-Benz OM401LA with a displacement of 9.6 dm^{3}, a maximum power of 213 kW (290 hp) at 2,100 rpm, and a maximum torque of 1,185 Nm at 1,100 rpm. Depending on the engine installed, the Autosan H10-12 could reach a maximum speed of 112–138 km/h. In 1995, a minor facelift was carried out, which included a new design for the front and rear single-leaf doors.

==== Autosan H10-12.16 Inter ====
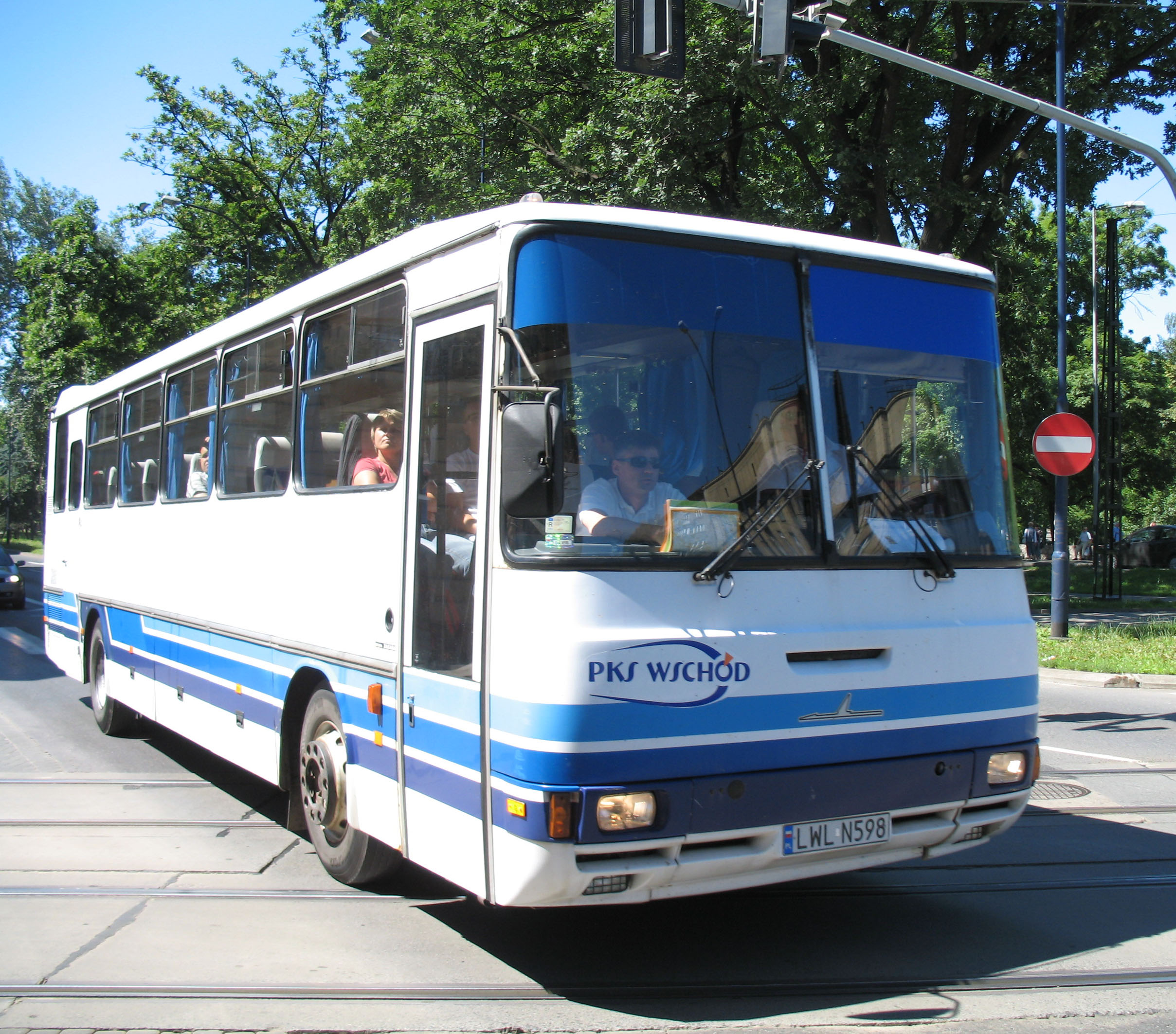
Autosan H10-12.16 Inter

In 1996, a significant modernization of the H10-12 model took place, during which the front and rear walls made of plastic were introduced, along with glued windows. A new design for the single-leaf front doors, made of aluminum with a glued window, was also implemented. The modernized bus was named Autosan H10-12.16 Inter and served as a more affordable alternative to the newly introduced Autosan A1012T, which represented the new generation of buses from the Sanok factory. The Inter model, like the other maxi variants in the H10 family, was powered by a 6-cylinder, in-line diesel engine type SWT 11/311/2, with a displacement of 11,100 cm^{3}, a maximum power of 176 kW (240 hp) at 2,200 rpm, and a maximum torque of 902 Nm at 1,500 rpm. This engine was paired with a 6-speed manual gearbox type S6-90. The maximum speed of the Autosan H10-12.16 Inter was 112 km/h. The bus was designed to carry 47 passengers in seats, plus a separate seat for the driver or 45 passengers in the version equipped with a chemical toilet. Upon customer request, the bus could also be fitted with additional features such as a refrigerator, a beverage dispenser, an audio-video system, decorative wheel covers, and an interior finished with fabric-covered ceiling and side panels. The production of the Autosan H10-12.16 Inter was eventually discontinued in 2000, with the last 14 units of this model being produced that year.

== Autosan H10-10 ==
=== Development ===
The aging design of the Autosan H9 series, which was the factory's main product, along with significant progress in the development of the new H10 family, led to the decision in the late 1980s to create a successor to the old series of buses. This successor would be a new variant of the H10 series. The first prototype of the 10-meter H10-10 midi-class bus was built in 1988. In comparison to the H10-11 models being produced at the time, the H10-10 featured a different body design, with a lowered roofline at the front, a raised lower line of the side windows, a new design for the front doors, rear lights borrowed from Ikarus buses, and wheel arches and a front bumper made from plastic. The prototype was powered by a 6-cylinder 6CT107 engine with a displacement of 6,540 cm^{3} and a maximum power output of 125 kW (170 hp), paired with a 5-speed manual gearbox S5-45 produced by the FPS plant in Tczew. The front axle and drive axle were supplied by FSC Star. These components were mounted on leaf springs. The bus also featured a pneumatic braking system.

Between 1990 and 1991, four additional prototypes of this version were presented. The first prototype, built in early 1990, was fully unified with the H10-11 model in terms of construction. The second prototype, built in late 1990, stood out with a raised side window line. In early 1991, the third prototype was introduced, which featured a lowered front roof section, removal of the front flap, a raised side window line, and a wider window behind the front doors. The fourth prototype, unified with the serial versions in terms of solutions, was based on the previous one but additionally featured wider plastic bumpers. All prototypes were powered by the Andoria 6CT107 engine.

=== Mass-produced models ===
Autosan H10-10.01/.02/.02R

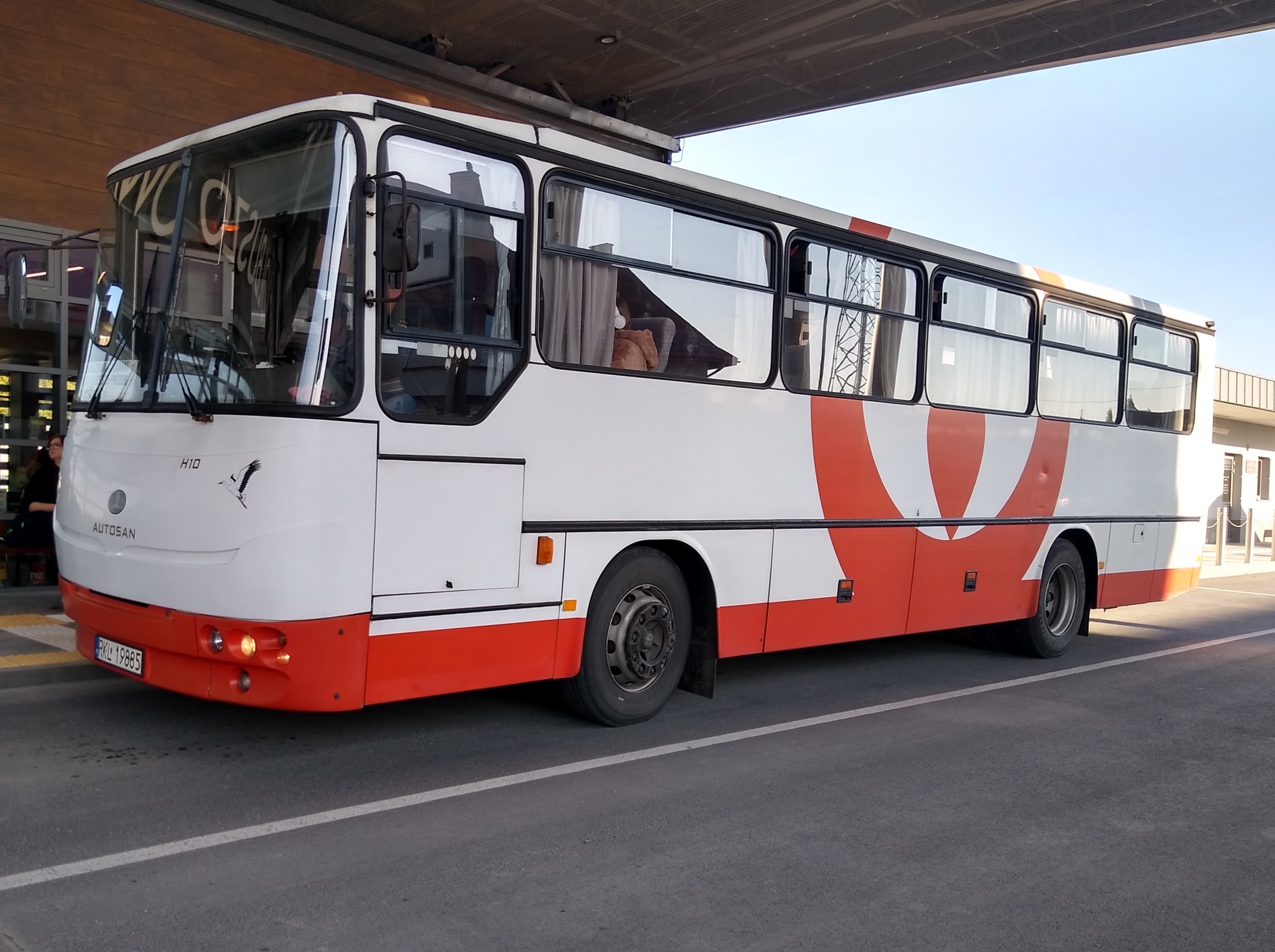
Autosan H10-10.02

Serial production of the smallest variant in the H10 series began in late 1992. The new model was powered by a turbocharged 6-cylinder 6CT107/A1 engine with a displacement of 6,540 cm^{3} and a maximum power output of 125 kW (170 hp), paired with a 5-speed manual gearbox S5-60. This powertrain allowed the vehicle to reach a maximum speed of 110 km/h. The chassis featured a front rigid axle and a rear rigid drive axle, supplied by FSC Star, with both axles mounted on leaf springs. The vehicle was designed to carry 43 passengers or 41 with reclining seats. Luggage was stored in underfloor compartments, with a total capacity of 4.5 m^{3}.

In 1994, the driving axles from Starachowice were replaced with components from FON Radomsko. The same year, a new version, the H10-10.02R, was introduced, equipped with a 6-cylinder diesel engine Renault MIDR 06.02.26W with a displacement of 6,177 cm^{3} and a maximum power output of 151 kW (205 hp), which met Euro 1 emission standards. In 1995, as with other models in the H10 series, a new single-leaf door design for the front and rear doors was introduced.

==== Autosan H10-10.02A/.02R/.02RE Midi ====
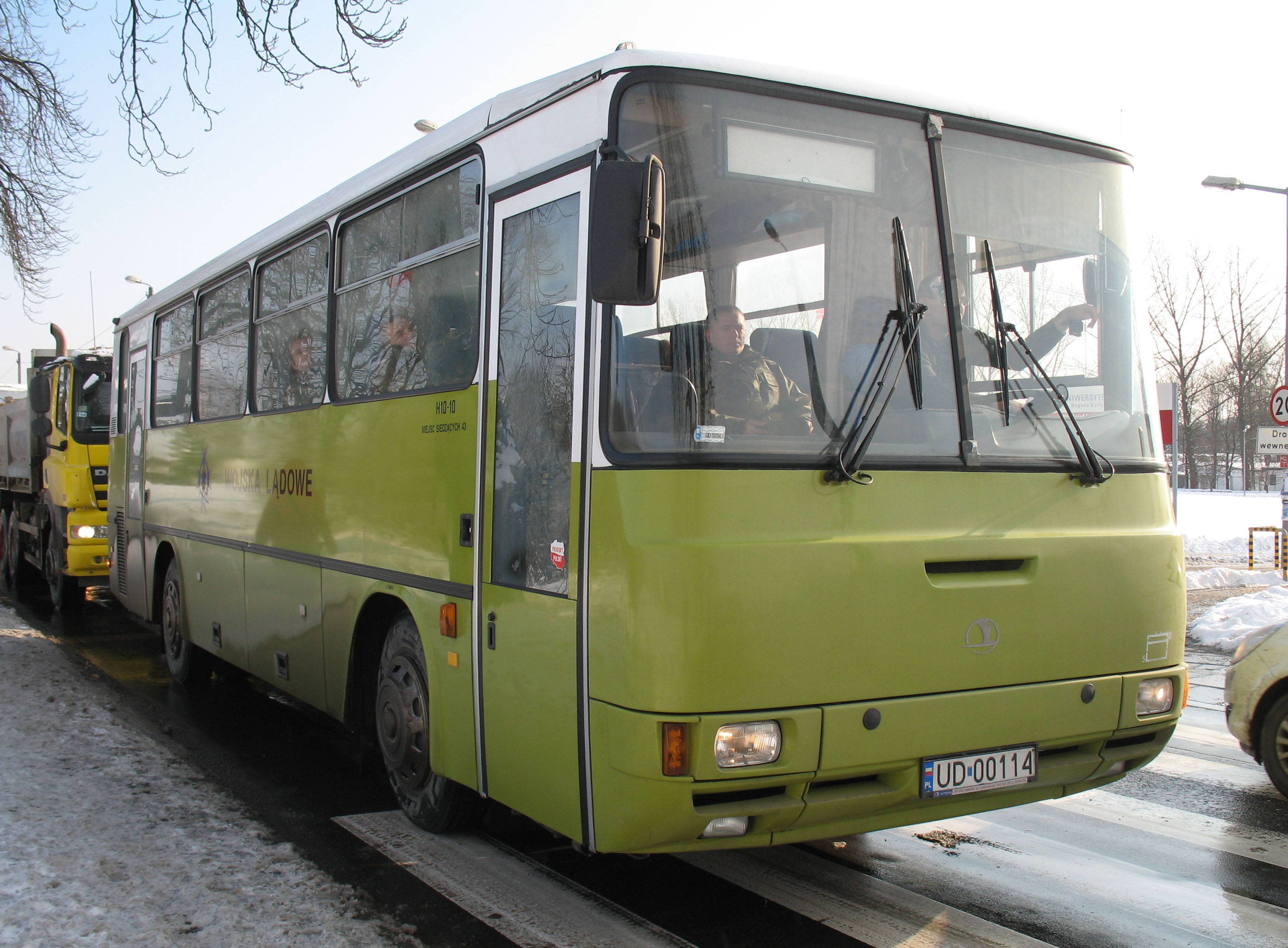
Autosan H10-10 Midi

In 1996, the H10-10 model underwent a modernization similar to other variants of the H10 series. Changes mainly affected the bodywork, where a front and rear wall made of plastics and a front door with an aluminum single-leaf design and glued glass were used. Electropneumatically controlled aluminum doors could optionally be installed at the rear, replacing the standard manually operated doors. The updated vehicle was given the additional "Midi" designation. The standard version, H10-10.02A Midi, was powered by the modernized 6-cylinder Andoria 6CT107-2/A1/3 engine, with a displacement of 6,540 cm^{3} and a maximum power of 125 kW (170 hp). The powertrain was paired with a 5-speed manual transmission FPS S5-60. Alternatively, the Renault MIDR 06.02.26W engine (151 kW or 205 hp), used in the H10-10.02R variant, could be installed. Later, this engine was replaced with the Renault MIDR 06.02.26W4 engine, which offered 154 kW (209 hp) and met Euro 2 emission standards. The Autosan Midi was designed to carry 43 passengers with seats or 41 with reclining seats. The vehicle's optional features included an audio-video system, refrigerator, beverage vending machine, decorative wheel covers, and fabric-covered interior ceiling and side panels.

In 1999, a school bus version, the Autosan H10-10S Urwis, was developed. It was adapted for transporting 45 students in hard plastic seats with fabric coverings, or alternatively 44 passenger seats and a space for a wheelchair. The Urwis featured bright body colors, appropriate markings, and a sound signal indicating the opening of the rear doors. However, the model did not gain popularity and was withdrawn from the offer in 2000. At the same time, a sanitary version based on the H10-10 Midi was developed, designed to transport 18 injured individuals on stretchers. Additionally, a version for mining rescue operations was created, equipped for use by the District Mining Rescue Stations). In this version, most of the passenger seats were removed to make space for specialized equipment mounted on racks or metal shelves. The exterior modifications initially included blue flashing signals, and later, standard aluminum luggage compartment doors were replaced with retractable covers for quick and easy access to the storage space. The serial production of the Autosan H10-10 Midi was concluded in 2003.

== Derivative models ==
=== Granus H10-11 ===
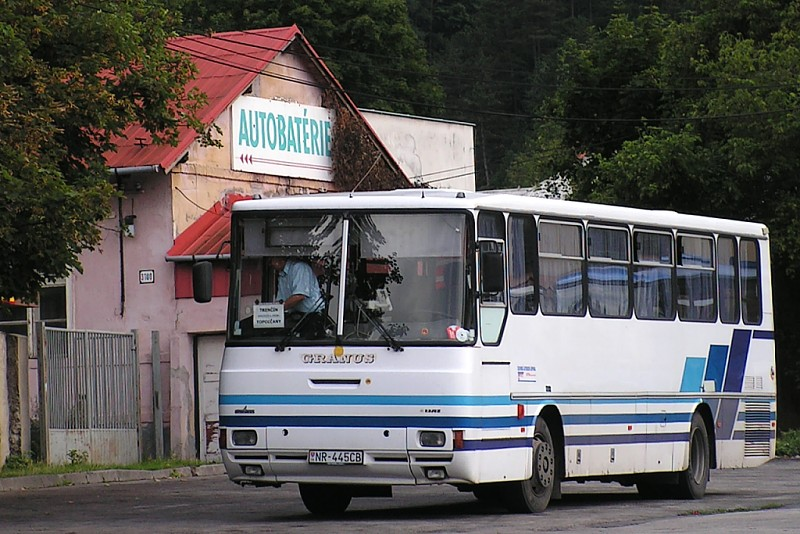
Granus H10-11 bus from SAD Žilina, assembled in Slovakia at the Granus (formerly LIAZ Zvolen) factories using components from the Autosan H10

In 1997, as part of efforts to enter foreign markets, the H10-11 suburban model was assembled in Slovakia by Granus (formerly LIAZ Zvolen) in Zvolen. This bus was sold as the Granus H10-11, with modifications to its drivetrain and suspension compared to the Polish counterpart. It was powered by a 6-cylinder, inline, turbocharged Steyr WD 615.50 diesel engine with a displacement of 9,726 cm^{3}, delivering a maximum power of 200 kW (272 hp) at 2,200 rpm, and a peak torque of 1,100 Nm at 1,200– 1,400 rpm. The engine was paired with a 6-speed manual transmission TS6-120. The Granus H10-11 could reach a top speed of 110 km/h. The vehicle was fitted with a LIAZ front axle and a PPS Detva rear drive axle. The production of this model concluded in 2001, with a total of 76 units built: 10 in 1997, 56 in 1998, 6 in 1999, 1 in 2000, and 3 in 2001.

=== PAZ 5269 ===
In the early 1990s, buses based on the Autosan H10 chassis started being assembled in Orenburg, Russia. In 1997, Autosan began collaborating with the Russian manufacturer PAZ. As part of this cooperation, buses based on Polish chassis were produced in Russia, including the PAZ 5269 built on the Autosan H10-12.28/P-4700 chassis with a Cummins engine. This collaboration lasted until 2000.

=== Rossan H10-11.11BT ===
In 1998, Autosan partnered with Russian companies Gorstrojelektrotrans and NII GET to build two Rossan H10-11.11BT trolleybuses for the city of Orenburg. The trolleybuses were based on the Autosan H10-11.11BMA bus, featuring 2-2-2 door configuration. The electrical installation was assembled in Russia. The trolleybus was powered by a 170 kW (231 hp) DC motor of the DK-211BM type. The control of the motor was managed by a pulse system with a RT-300/700B2M thyristor regulator. The vehicle was designed to carry 123 passengers, including 21 seated.

== Prototypes ==
=== Autosan H10-35 ===
In 1983, the prototype of the Autosan H10-35 city bus was constructed. This bus was an extension of the concept introduced in the 1978 prototype H9/II, which featured four pairs of double-leaf doors to enable fast passenger exchange. The new vehicle was intended as the successor to the widely used, older-generation H9-35. The H10-35 was designed to transport 90 passengers, including 22 seated passengers. The interior featured various finishing elements from the Jelcz PR110U, including door mechanisms, handles, and seats. The vehicle's chassis included a front axle produced by Jelcz and a rear drive axle from Rába, both supported by pneumatic bellows. The engine was the 6CT107 with an output of 125 kW (170 hp). The prototype was delivered to MKS Sanok in 1985.

=== Autosan H10-30 ===
After constructing the H10-35 prototype, further work continued on the urban variant of the H10 series, resulting in the creation of three H10-30 prototypes in 1985. These prototypes represented a development of the older prototype. The first operational tests of the H10-30 took place in 1983. Compared to the H10-35, the bodywork featured square headlights and more plastic elements, such as bumpers and the casing for the window skylight, intended to hold the display showing the bus line number and travel direction. One of the three prototypes featured a front axle imported from Hungary instead of the Jelcz-produced axle. In 1987, the final example of this model was presented, which did not differ in components from the fourth prototype from 1985. That same year, further work on the H10-30 model was abandoned in favor of focusing on the development of intercity buses.

== Construction ==
=== Body ===
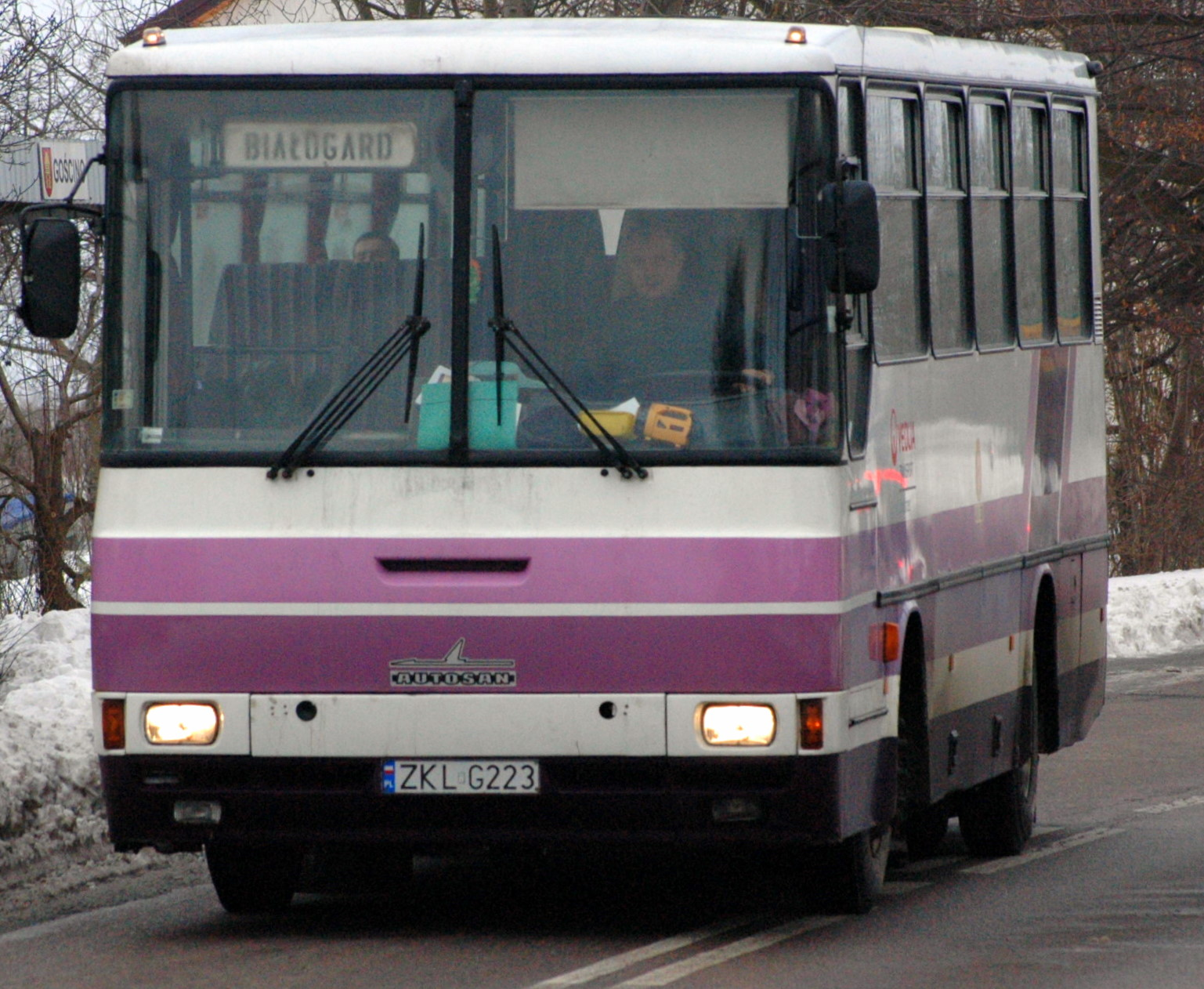
Autosan H10-10 Midi

The body structure of the H10 series models was made of square and rectangular steel tubes welded together. The body was mounted on a longitudinal-truss frame. The external cladding was made of steel sheets. From 1996, the front and rear walls were made of plastic and attached to the body frame using adhesive. The hatches and doors were made of aluminum, while the side cladding consisted of galvanized sheets.

For the interior, laminated panels were used for the ceiling and side walls – initially wood-like, later in ivory or white. Upon customer request, ceiling and side panels could be finished with fabric upholstery. The floor was covered with Taraflex flooring, later replaced with PVC flooring. Ventilation was provided through window openings, roof hatches, openings in the front wall, and exhaust vents. In the H10-12 model, ventilation tunnels were installed, with air being forced into them by roof-mounted fans. This system allowed for individual air supply to each seat. In intercity buses H10-10 and H10-12, it was possible to install an air conditioning unit for the passenger compartment. Heating was provided by a heating unit connected to the engine cooling system, along with additional heaters.

=== Chassis and braking system ===
The H10-11 and H10-12 models featured a dependent suspension system with a rigid front axle and a rigid rear drive axle, supported by air bellows, telescopic shock absorbers, and anti-roll stabilizers. In 1991, to improve driving characteristics, the spacing of the air bellows was increased. The primary supplier of axles was the Hungarian company Rába; however, in the 1980s, some vehicles were also offered with Jelcz front axles. In 1997, the H10-11 model introduced the option of installing a rear axle from FON Radomsko. The Autosan H10-10 used a fully mechanical suspension. Drive axles from FSC Star were suspended on leaf springs and telescopic shock absorbers, additionally supported by anti-roll stabilizers. From 1994 onward, only axles manufactured by FON Radomsko were used.

The H10 series buses were equipped with a dual-circuit pneumatic braking system with automatic clearance adjustment. Drum brakes were used on both axles. The H10 series also featured a pneumatically controlled spring emergency brake acting on the rear wheels and a mechanical parking brake with a pneumatic actuator. The engine brake, controlled electro-pneumatically from the driver's seat, was integrated into the exhaust system. In later years, ABS became a standard feature.

=== Electrical system ===
The H10 series buses were equipped with a 24 V electrical system. Power generation was provided by an alternator with a current rating of 80 A or 85 A. In the urban variants H10-11.11B and H10-11.11BM, due to higher energy demand, a 140 A alternator was used. The electrical system stored generated power in two 180 Ah rechargeable batteries. The electrical system powered essential bus components, including the engine supply system, exterior and interior lighting, heating, ventilation system, and pneumatic installation. Additionally, upon customer request, optional electrical equipment such as air conditioning, a refrigerator, a radio, or a beverage vending machine could be installed.
