= Autosan H9 =

Series of buses

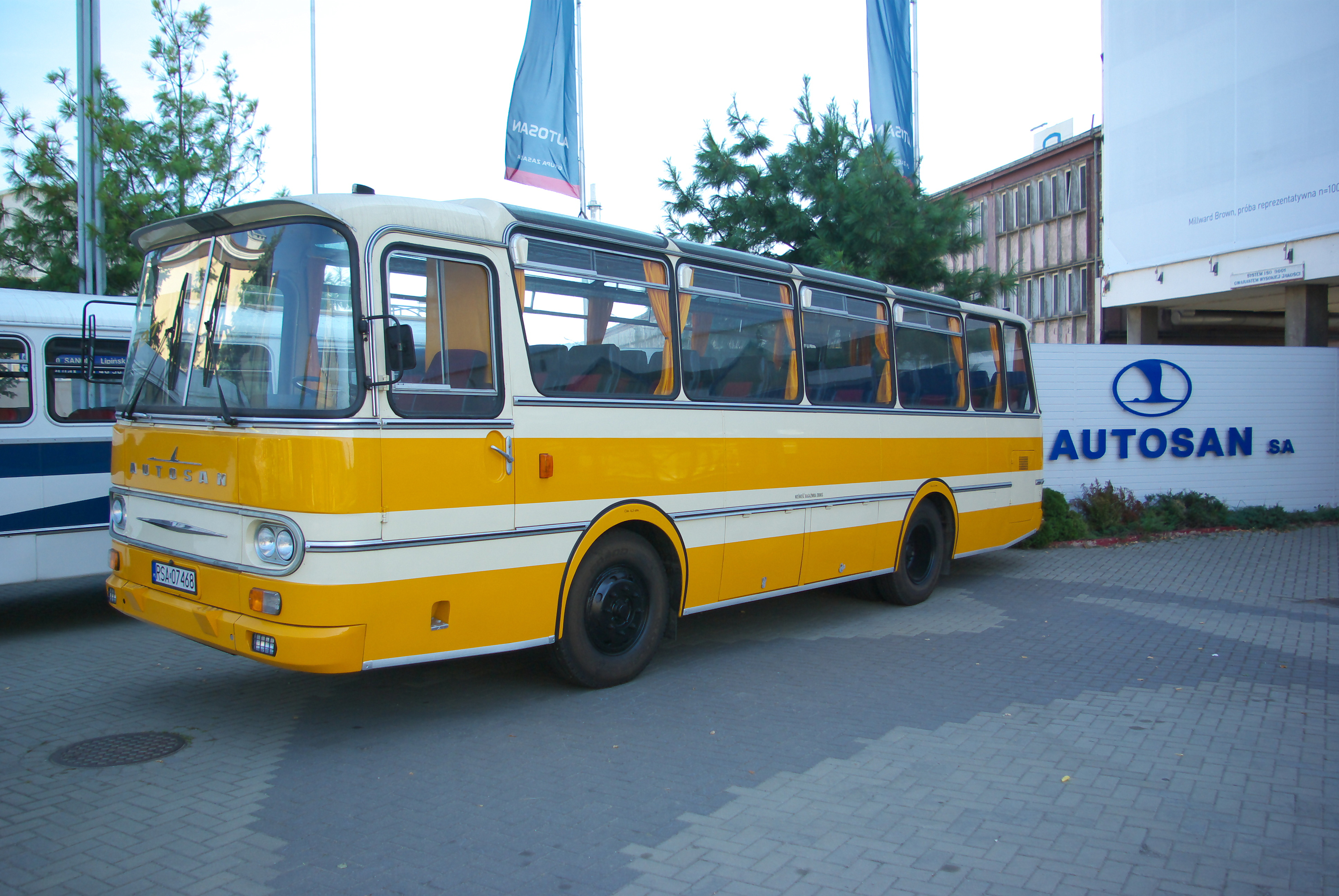
- Bus model Autosan H9-15 from 1977 displayed in front of the factory headquarters

Overview
- Manufacturer: Autosan
- Production: 1974–2006
- Assembly: Sanok, Poland

Body and chassis
- Body style: midi bus
- Doors: 2 (3 until 1977)

Powertrain
- Engine: 6C107; S359 until 1980
- Transmission: S5-45; ZF S5-14

Dimensions
- Wheelbase: 4,000 mm (160 in); 4,700 mm (190 in) H9-20/21
- Length: 9,310 mm (367 in); 10,000 mm (390 in) H9-20/21
- Width: 2,500 mm (98 in)
- Height: 2,990 mm (118 in); 3,150 mm (124 in) H9-20/21
- Curb weight: 7,700 kg (17,000 lb); 8,400 kg (18,500 lb) H9-20/21

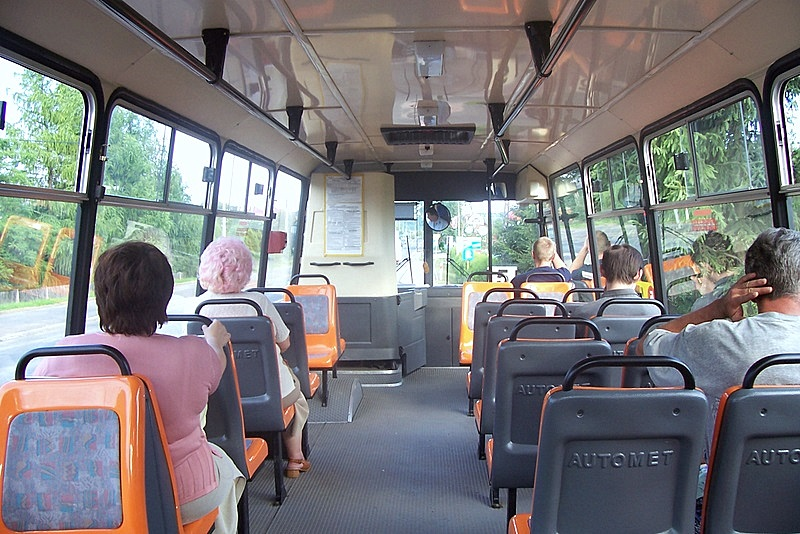
Interior of the vehicle

The Autosan H9 is a series of local, intercity, and urban midi-class buses produced between 1974 and 2002 at the Sanok Bus Factory and later at Autosan facilities in Sanok. A few units were still produced until 2006. The bus gained significant popularity on the domestic market, especially among PKS enterprises, and to a lesser extent, driving schools and private carriers. This popularity was influenced by its simple and durable design, resistant to poor road conditions in Poland, ease of repair and service, and low cost.

== Origins ==
The first work on the creation of a new bus, intended as the successor to the San H100 model, began in 1967. The H100 was considered outdated and was seen as a temporary solution for the Sanok Bus Factory. The new vehicle was intended to be a medium-capacity bus with the engine located behind the rear axle. It was also planned for the overall body length to be slightly longer than that of the San H100.

== First prototypes ==
=== Sanos A9 ===
After establishing cooperation with the Yugoslav company Karoserija – 11 Oktomvri from Skopje (now North Macedonia), 15 prototype units of a 9-meter bus were built in various versions: urban, suburban, intercity, and tourist (1967), designated as Sanos A9. The interior of the vehicle was designed to carry 38 passengers seated. The propulsion was provided by a 6-cylinder in-line diesel engine of the SW-400 type, with a displacement of 6,540 cm^{3} and a power of 92 kW (125 hp). This engine was produced under license from Leyland Motors at WSW Andoria in Andrychów. It was placed longitudinally behind the rear axle, which allowed for the creation of storage spaces under the floor for luggage compartments. The prototypes featured a wagon-type body based on a frame construction connected to a truss skeleton. The overall body length was 9,160 mm, the wheelbase was 4,000 mm, and the curb weight was 7,444 kg. The bus could reach a speed of 96 km/h, consuming an average of 27 liters of fuel per 100 km. The bus was planned to enter serial production in 1969.

=== Sanok 09 ===
At the end of 1967, the Sanok Bus Factory independently started work on its own bus. The design team included engineers from the Sanok Bus Factory, the Kraków University of Technology, the Industrial Automotive Institute, and the Military Technical Academy. In the fourth quarter of 1967, a pre-prototype model of the new bus, designated Sanok 09, was presented. In terms of technical solutions, the Sanok 09 was similar to the Sanos A9. The bus was based on a steel frame, on which a truss structure body with steel sheet cladding was mounted. The right side of the bus featured single-wing, manually operated doors at both the front and rear overhangs, leading to the interior. The left side of the bus had a door for the driver. Under the floor, there were luggage compartments, accessible from the outside through side hatches on both sides of the body. Ventilation of the interior was provided by two roof hatches and the opening upper parts of the windows.

The bus was powered by a licensed Leyland SW400 engine with a displacement of 6,540 cm^{3} and a maximum power of 92 kW (125 hp) at 2,400 rpm, paired with a five-speed manual transmission designated S5-45, produced under license from the German company ZF Friedrichshafen in Tczew. The drivetrain allowed the vehicle, with a curb weight of 7,300 kg, to reach a speed of 80 km/h. The average fuel consumption was 22 liters of diesel per 100 km.

The bus design utilized some components from the prototype of the Star A-200 truck. The front suspension used a rigid beam suspended on double leaf springs, while the rear suspension consisted of a rigid drive axle supported by two leaf springs. The bus was equipped with a hydraulic braking system with pressure assistance and an engine brake. The auxiliary brake worked on the rear axle wheels.

In 1968, a series of 4 prototypes of the Sanok 09 was created in intercity and tourist versions. The intercity version was equipped with 39 seats, while the tourist version was adapted for 33 passengers. That same year, prototype vehicle number 1 was presented at the International Motor Show in Poznań. Compared to the San H100, the Sanok 09 offered a much higher level of comfort, made possible by optional air conditioning, aircraft-style seats, and a better-soundproofed interior. After testing the Sanos A9 and Sanok 09 buses, the decision was made to choose the Polish model for further development.

== Autosan H9 ==
=== Autosan H9-01/02/03/04/15 ===
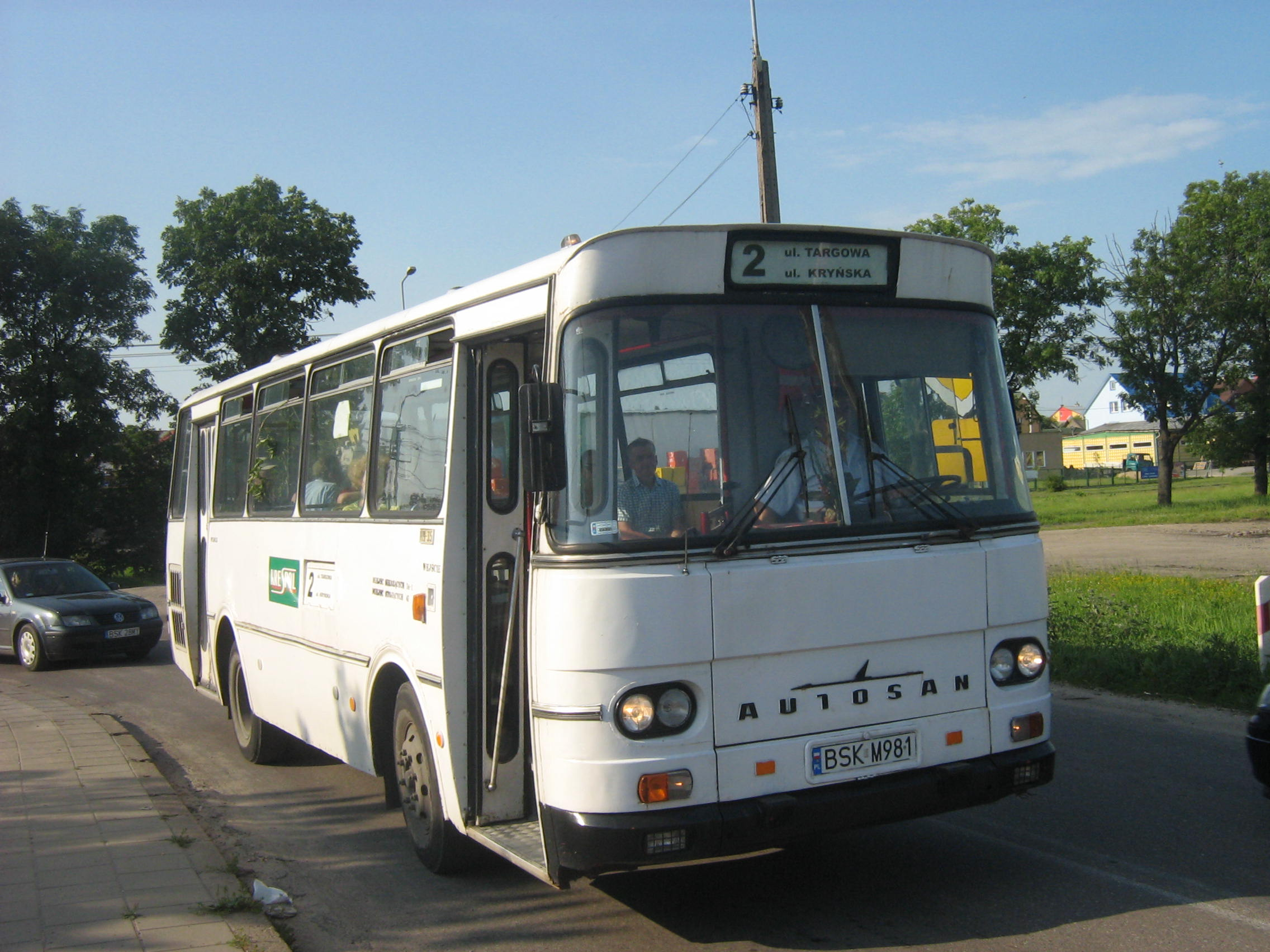
Autosan H9-35 from Krespol Sokółka company

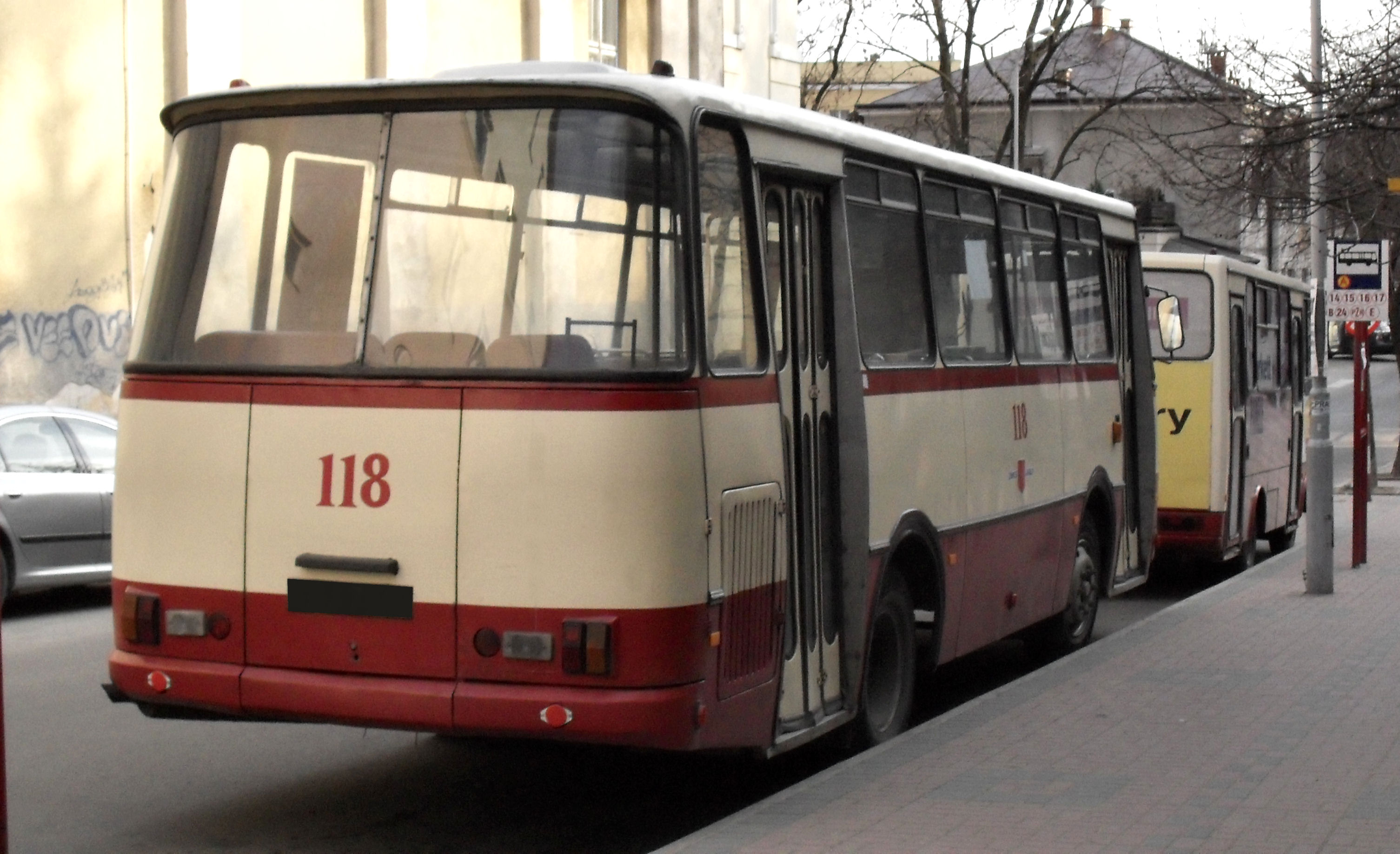
Autosan H9-35 from ZMKS Jasło – rear of the bus

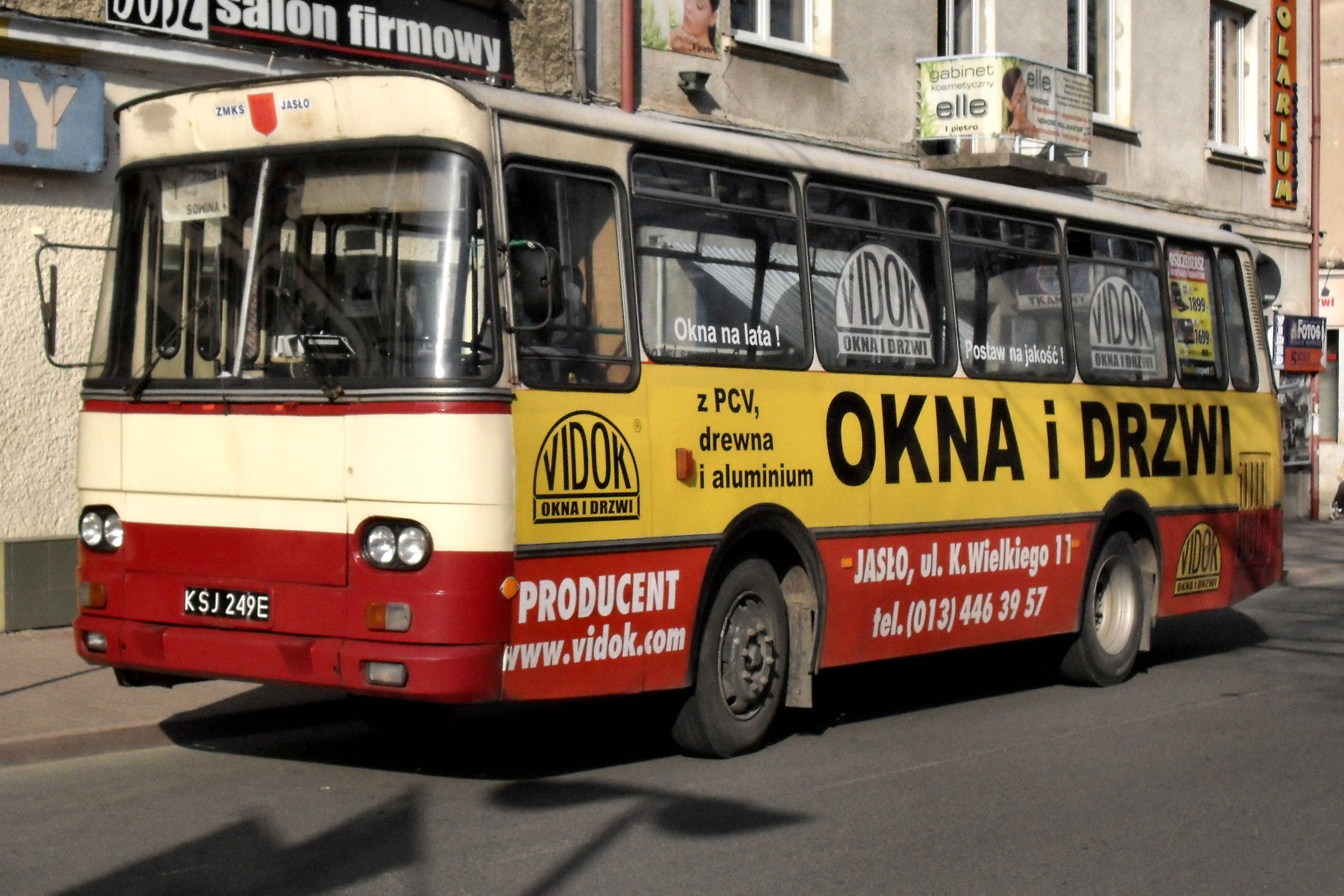
Autosan H9-35 from ZMKS Jasło – left side of the bus

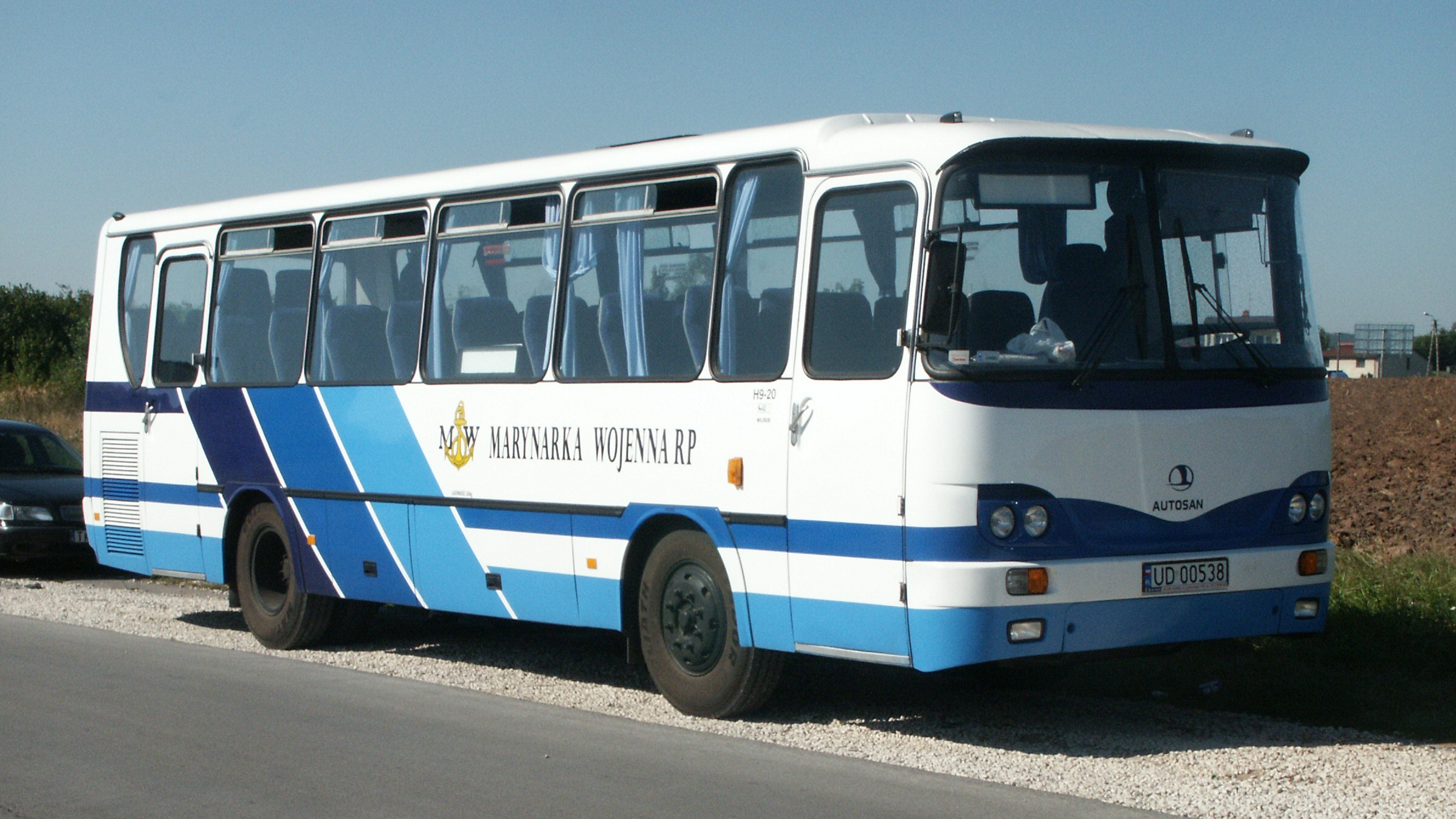
Autosan H9-20 bus belonging to the Polish Navy Command in Gdynia. Registration number UD 00538

In 1970, a further improved prototype of the Autosan H9 was presented. Compared to previous prototypes, the vehicle's total length was increased to 9,310 mm, allowing the passenger capacity to be increased to 48 people (36+2 seated, 10 standing). For propulsion, the prototypes used the 6-cylinder SW-107 engine from Andrychów with a maximum output of 101.5 kW (138 hp), or the S359 engine produced in Starachowice, delivering 110 kW (150 hp). The braking system was modernized with a pneumatic control system for both primary and auxiliary brakes. The bodywork was also changed, with a characteristic bend in the front part of the roofline and additional windows along the window belt. Tourist versions were more richly equipped compared to intercity versions, typically featuring airline-style seats for added comfort.

In 1970, a pre-production informational series consisting of 6 units was built. In the following years, more vehicles were produced in three test series: 1971 (6 units), 1972 (22 units), and 1973 (51 units). These prototype buses were put into service on regular PKS routes.

Mass production began on 27 July 1974 in two equipment versions: tourist (H9-02) and intercity (H9-03). The vehicles were equipped with a 6-cylinder inline diesel engine, the Andoria 6C107, with a displacement of 6,540 cm^{3} and a maximum power of 101.5 kW (138 hp), or a 6-cylinder inline engine, the Star S359, with a displacement of 6,840 cm^{3} and a power of 110 kW (150 hp). Both power units were paired with a 5-speed manual transmission, type S5-45. The suspension of the front rigid axle and rear drive axle was based on semi-elliptic leaf springs and hydraulic telescopic shock absorbers. Compared to its competitors, the H9 series stood out for its corrosion protection quality. That same year, the design was awarded the title of Master of Technology in the Rzeszów Land, and the creators of the Autosan H9 were later honored with the First Prize from the Regional Board of the Polish Federation of Engineering Associations the following year. Models from the H9-15 tourist version with luxury equipment were included in the service for the 1976 Ice Hockey World Championships, held from 8 to 25 April 1976 in Katowice.

In 1977, structural changes were made to the H9 model. The rear axle, braking system, and front axle were improved. A year later, two prototypes were presented: the Autosan H9/II (urban) and the Autosan H9/III (intercity). They featured a boxy body style and rectangular front headlights borrowed from the Wartburg 353. The bodies of both prototypes were 10 meters long, and they were powered by the 6C107/1 engine. These prototypes initiated the design work on a new family of buses under the H10 designation.

On 22 May 1975, the 2,500th unit of the model was produced. By 1979, 17,178 units of the H9 intercity version had been made. Production of the H9-03, H9-15, and their derivatives ceased in 1980.

On 9 January 1981, the 25,000th Autosan H9 model was produced.

H9 family versions from between 1974 and 1980:

- Autosan H9-01 – intercity version, S359 engine
- Autosan H9-02 – tourist version, S359 engine
- Autosan H9-03 – intercity version, 6C107 engine
- Autosan H9-04 – tourist version, 6C107 engine
- Autosan H9-07 – tourist version, 6C107 engine
- Autosan H9-09 – export tropical version, 6C107 engine
- Autosan H9-12 – tourist version, S359 engine
- Autosan H9-15 – tourist version equipped with a microphone, speakers, and radio, 6C107 engine
- Autosan H9-17 – prototype with a 10-meter body, 6C107 engine

=== Autosan H9-33/35 ===
In 1969, a prototype of the H9 series was built in an urban version. Changes in this version mainly affected the interior, which was redesigned and adapted to carry 70 passengers, 23 of whom could sit. The body was equipped with two pairs of doors, mounted on the front and rear overhangs, controlled electropneumatically from the driver's seat. A manually operated door was installed on the left side leading to the driver's area. A space for a destination sign was placed above the windshield. The electrical system was modified, and power steering was added.

Serial production of the urban versions of the H9 series began on 18 September 1975. Depending on the engine used, these buses were designated as H9-33 with the S359 engine or H9-35 with the 6C107 engine. The serial vehicles were designed to carry 70 passengers, 24 of whom were seated. The interior was equipped with components from the larger Jelcz PR100 bus and the Polski Fiat 125p car. Compared to the intercity and tourist versions, the luggage compartments were removed, and the floor height was lowered by 35 mm (945 mm), along with a reduction in the height of the entry steps. The body had a level roofline in the front part and featured four-wing folding doors on both the front and rear overhangs, controlled from the driver's seat. A space for the destination sign was positioned above the front window. The electrical system operated at 24V, allowing the unification of equipment with the Jelcz PR100. The Autosan H9-35 model was available for sale from 4 December 1975, with the first batch of several vehicles delivered to Wałbrzych. In the same month, further buses of this series were sent to Wrocław, Zielona Góra, Białystok, Olsztyn, and Gdańsk.

Until 1977, urban versions of the H9 had a door for the driver on the left side of the vehicle. That same year, the interior heating system and door opening mechanisms were improved. From 1978 onwards, the model used the ZF 8060 steering gear, equipped with power steering, and a new steering wheel from Jelcz's city buses. In 1980, the H9-33 model was discontinued due to low customer interest caused by engine reliability issues. In 1981, the Autosan H9-35 underwent a modernization aimed at unifying the vehicle's design with the newly introduced H9-20 and H9-21 models. As a result of the changes, the bus was equipped with a turbocharged engine, the 6CT107/A3, with a displacement of 6,540 cm^{3} and a maximum power of 110 kW (150 hp). The engine was paired with a 5-speed manual transmission, the S5-45. The body of the bus had additional small windows in the window belt removed. In 1992, production of axles by FON Radomsko began, replacing the previous components from Starachowice. In 1995, minor changes were made to the front wall of the vehicle, and the opening sections of the windows were enlarged. The Autosan H9-35 was discontinued in 2000. Over the 25 years of production, 8709 units of the H9-33/35 version were built.

In 1976, a group of 12 factory employees received the First-Class Award from the Minister of Machine Industry for developing and launching the production of the "Autosan H9-35" model.

=== Autosan H9-20/21 ===
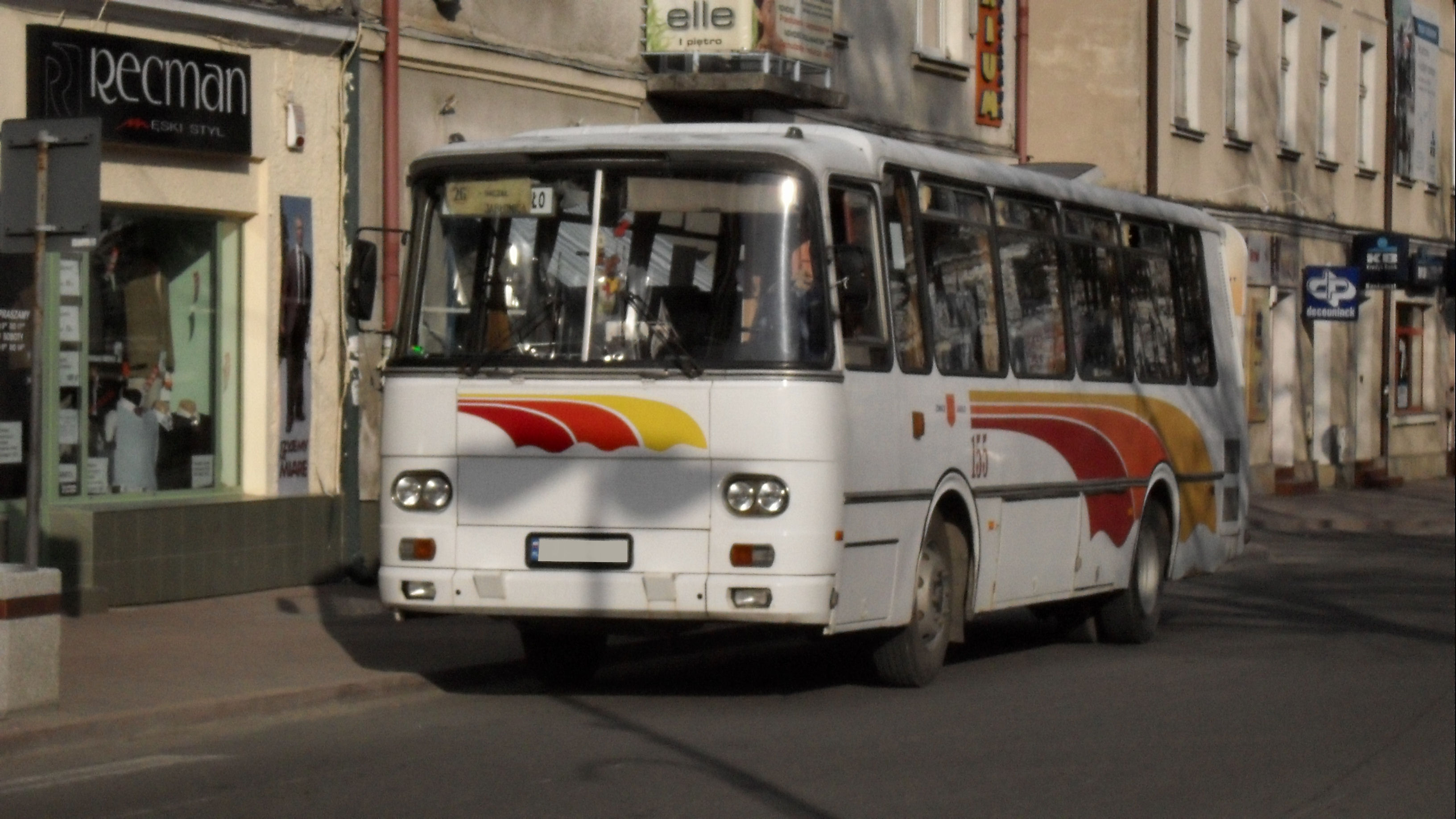
Autosan H9-21 from ZMKS Jasło

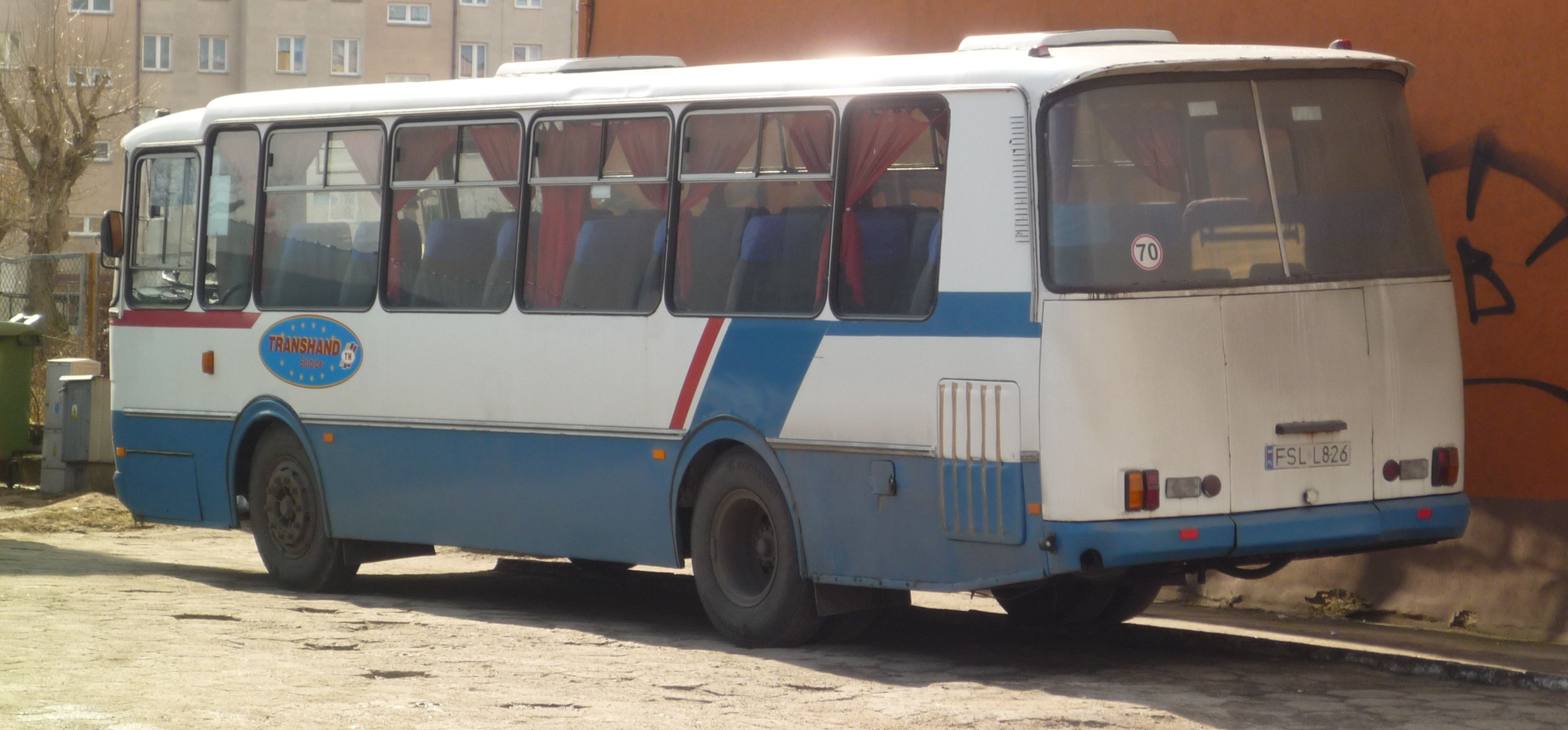
Autosan H9-21 from Transhand Słubice – rear of the bus

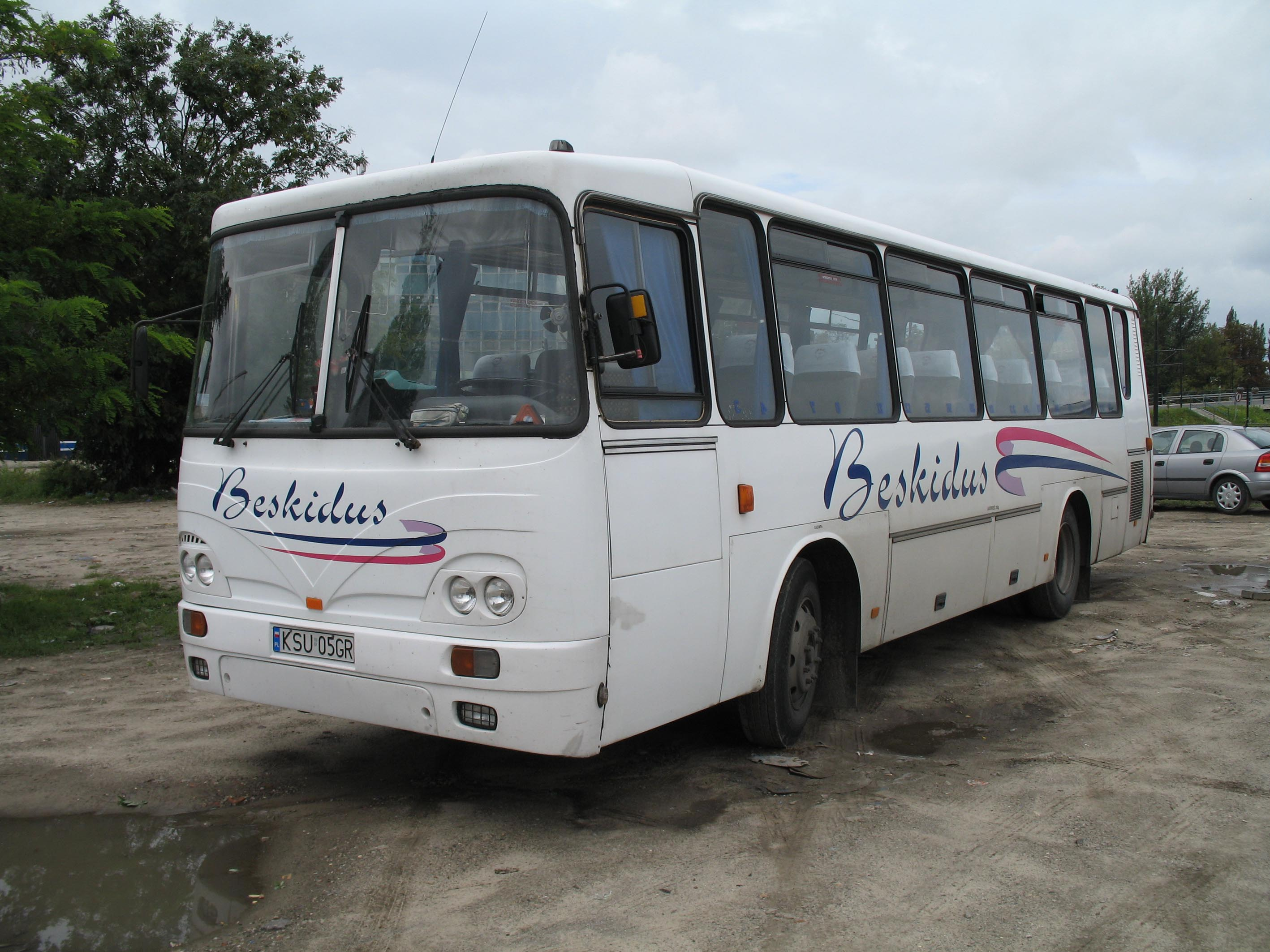
Autosan H9-21 from PKS Beskidus Sucha Beskidzka

In 1976, the project named Autosan H9/I was created. The vehicles built at that time featured a lengthened wheelbase, extended from 4,000 mm to 4,700 mm, and a modernized body that increased in length to 10,000 mm. A number of improvements were also made in the design. Five prototypes were built in the following variants:

- Autosan H9-19 – engine S359, rear axle ratio 6.33
- Autosan H9-20 – engine 6CT107/A3, rear axle ratio 5.43
- Autosan H9-23 – engine 6C107, rear axle ratio 6.33

Serial production of the modernized intercity and tourist buses of the H9 series began on 6 March 1980. Compared to the older versions, the H9-20 (tourist version) and H9-21 (intercity version) models had a body extended by 690 mm (to 10,000 mm) and increased in height by 160 mm (to 3,150 mm). Additional changes to the body included the removal of side windows in the rear pillars and window belt. These models were adapted to carry 41 seated passengers in the case of the H9-20 version, or 51 passengers, 39 of whom were seated, in the Autosan H9-21 version. The side walls and ceiling of the bus interior were finished with laminate panels. The front wall was covered with faux leather, and the floor was finished with taraflex material. The passenger space was heated by a water unit and electric heaters. Ventilation was provided by vents in the front wall of the vehicle, roof hatches, and the opening top sections of side windows.

The buses were powered by the modernized, turbocharged Andoria 6CT107/A3 engine (later 6CT107/A6/7) with a displacement of 6,540 cm^{3} and a maximum power of 110 kW (150 hp), which from 1981 was also used to power the H9-35 bus. This engine was paired with a 5-speed manual transmission, S5-45. The exhaust system was modified to reduce interior noise. Additionally, many other elements of the bus were upgraded, including a hydraulically controlled clutch, a tachometer, new hinges for internal luggage compartment doors and the engine compartment, a new welded floor, and modifications to certain roof components.

Despite the aging design, the bus was produced alongside the H10 model. This was influenced by the fact that the factory faced difficulties in increasing the production level of the H10, while the demand for medium-class buses was very high.

In 1992, the H9-20.41 and H9-21.41 variants were introduced to production, replacing the Star-made drive axle and front axle with components from FON Radomsko. In 1995, the front wall was modernized, replacing the plastic manufacturer logo with a sticker. Additionally, the opening parts of the side windows were enlarged.

In 1997, Autosan established a cooperation with the Russian bus manufacturer Pavlovo Bus Factory, resulting in the production of a series of 10.1-meter, medium-floor PAZ-4223 city buses built on the H9-20/21 chassis. These buses were powered by a Cummins B5.9-180-10 engine with a maximum power of 132 kW (180 hp), paired with a 5-speed manual transmission TS 5-60. This model was designed to carry 80 passengers, 27 of whom were seated. Production of buses on the Polish chassis ended in 2000.

In 1999, a special version of the H9-21 model, the Autosan H9-21.41S Kleks school bus, was introduced. This version featured 42 hard plastic passenger seats, an audible warning signal for the opening of the rear doors, and front two-leaf pneumatic doors operated from the driver's seat. In the rear section of the interior, between the right wheel arch and the door, there was space for a wheelchair. Externally, the "Kleks" version stood out with bright orange paint, informational signs, and contour lamps placed at the rear of the roof. In 2000, single-leaf front doors made of aluminum from the Autosan A0909L Tramp model were used. Starting in 1999, optionally pneumatic two-leaf front doors were installed in the intercity version, and shortly after, similar solutions were introduced for the rear doors. The following year, the option to install single-leaf front doors was introduced.

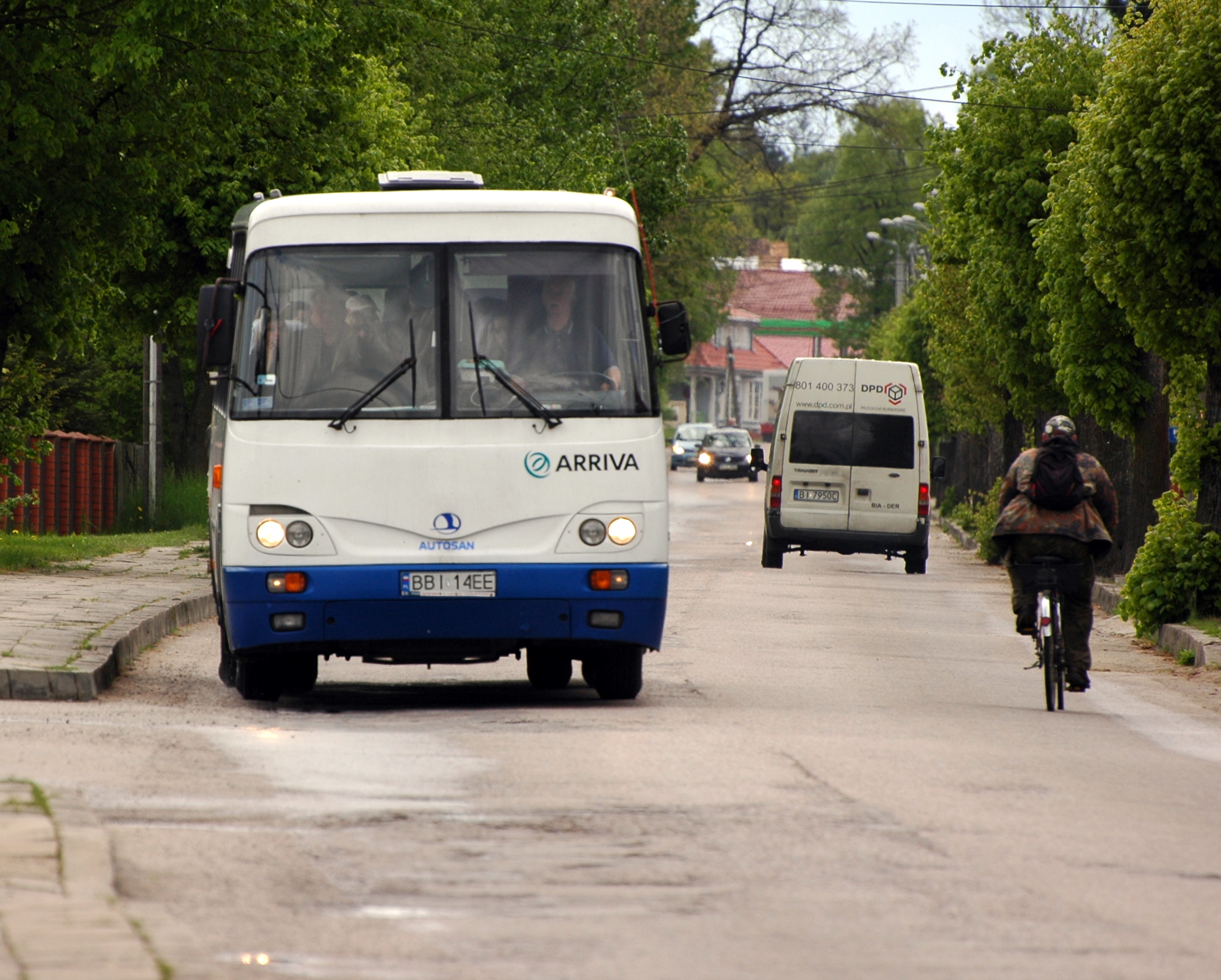
Autosan H9-21/A09 was produced from 2005

In 2004, production of the H9 series buses was discontinued. The last batch produced had front and rear panels from another bus model, the A0909L, and was labeled as "H9-21/A09". According to other sources, the last 4 units of this series were made in 2005 for three customers. In 2006, production of the "H9-21/A09" models resumed. 30 units were made for Veolia Transport Polska, equipped with the Andoria 6CT107-3 Euro-2 engine with a maximum power of 125 kW (170 hp). These vehicles did not meet the emission standards at the time, but their registration was possible due to a special decision by the Minister of Transport, who exempted this series of vehicles from the requirement for homologation.

=== Autosan A0909L Tramp ===
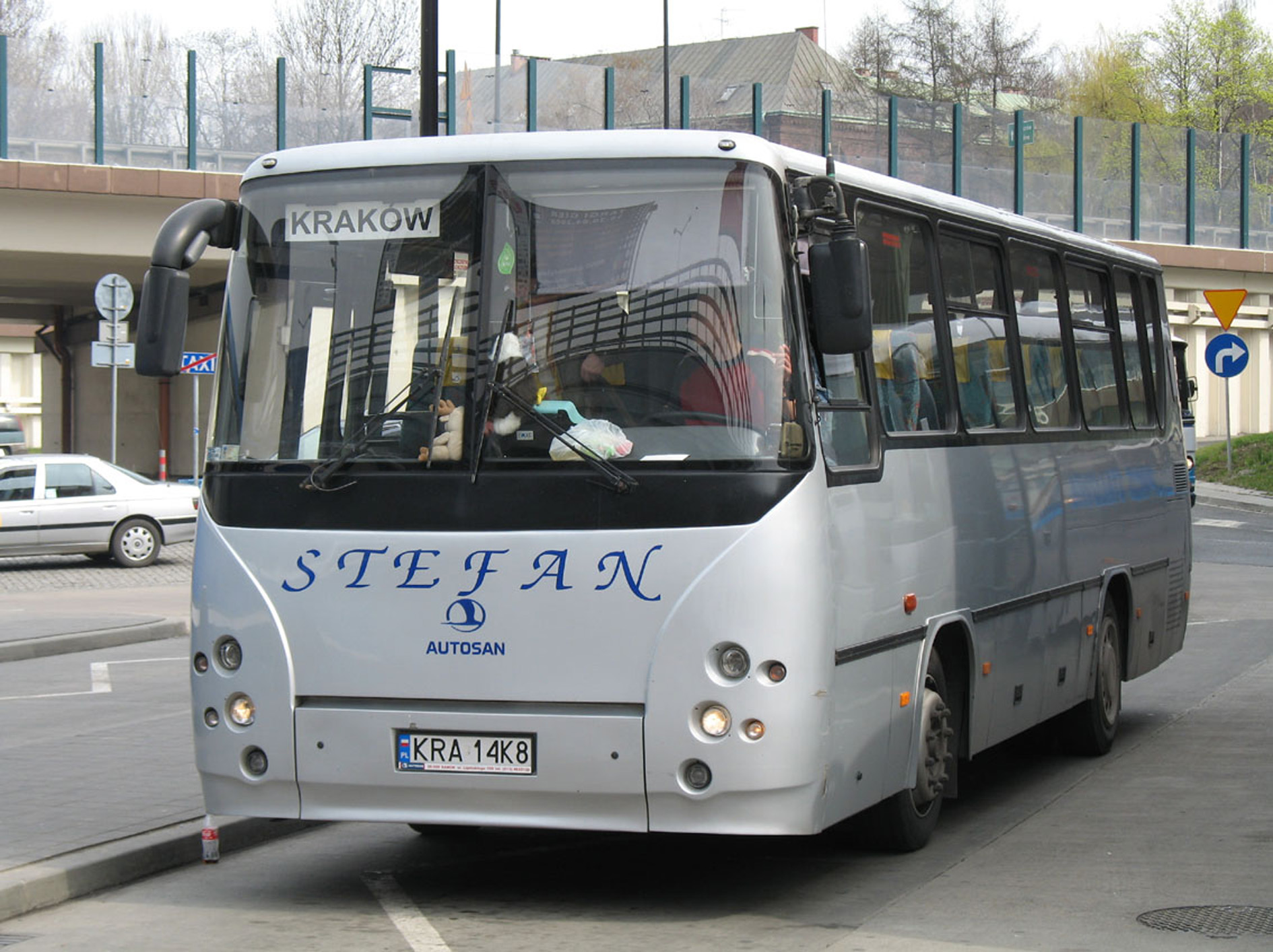
Autosan A0909L Tramp

The Autosan A0909L Tramp was gradually modernized during its production. As a result of a major redesign of the Autosan H9 in 2000, the A0909L Tramp model was introduced. In the same year, its school variant, the Autosan A0909S Smyk, also known as the "gimbus", entered production.

=== Special versions ===
Many special versions of the Autosan H9, classified as service vehicles, were produced, particularly in the late 1970s and early 1980s. These included mobile shops, conference buses, cinema buses, analytical laboratories, X-ray units, blood donation centers, and postal service buses:

- Autosan H9-12.05 – sanitary version produced in 1979 for the Libyan market.
- Autosan H9-15.05 – designed for mobile food sales, developed in 1977.
- Autosan H9-20S – mobile sales unit.
- Autosan H9-20.33 – shop bus introduced in 1990.
- Autosan H9 "Laboratorium" – mobile laboratory from 1978, equipped for environmental contamination testing.
- Autosan H9-20 – cinema bus, first built in 1977 for the Wytwórnia Filmów Fabularnych studio in Wrocław.
- Autosan H9-28 RTG – X-ray-equipped version developed in 1980, with the first 10 units delivered to the Tuberculosis Institute in Wrocław; 22 units were produced in 1982.
- Autosan H9-20.16 – postal service version.
- Autosan H9-32 – mobile blood donation unit, built in 1999 for the Regional Blood Donation and Hemotherapy Center in Kielce.
- Autosan H9-21.41S Kleks – school bus produced from 1999 to 2002, featuring pneumatically operated double-leaf front doors, 42 hard plastic seats, bright orange paint, and appropriate markings.
- Autosan H10K – conference bus built in 1978.

== Reception ==
The Autosan H9 was primarily delivered to PKS enterprises, driving schools, and private transport operators. Its key advantages included economical and mechanically simple engines, with an average fuel consumption of 20 liters of diesel per 100 km. The bus' overhaul interval ranged between 300,000 and 500,000 km. One of the main drawbacks of the H9 was its easily corroding bodywork. However, its durable and rigid mechanical suspension system for both axles ensured reliable operation. In cold temperatures, issues with the drivetrain and electrical system were common.

== Prototypes based on the Autosan H9 ==
=== Autosan H11 ===
In 1968, a prototype of an 11-meter intercity bus, the Autosan H11, was developed as an evolution of the Sanok 09 model. The interior configuration allowed for 63 passengers, including 45 seated. The prototype was powered by a 6-cylinder inline SW 680 diesel engine with a displacement of 11,100 cm^{3} and a maximum output of 149 kW (200 hp), paired with a 6-speed manual ZF S6-90 transmission. The bus had an unladen weight of 9,800 kg and a payload capacity of 5,780 kg. It reached a top speed of 88 km/h, with an average fuel consumption of 28.3 liters per 100 km. The chassis incorporated components from the Jelcz 315 truck. The front axle was supported by two leaf springs and two telescopic shock absorbers, while the rear suspension featured a rigid Rába P018 axle mounted on leaf springs with hydraulic telescopic shock absorbers.

=== Autosan H12 ===
In 1971, another prototype model, the Autosan H12, was built. Like the H11 prototype, it was an extended version of the H9 family. The vehicle was designed to carry 54 seated passengers, with an additional 10 standing. The Autosan H12 was powered by a Polish-made 6-cylinder inline SW 680 diesel engine with a displacement of 11,100 cm^{3} and a maximum output of 149 kW (200 hp). It was paired with a 5-speed manual 315.20 transmission. The vehicle had an unladen weight of 10,400 kg and a payload capacity of 5,200 kg. The bus had a top speed of 88 km/h and an average fuel consumption of 28.3 liters per 100 km.

=== Autosan H10-10P ===
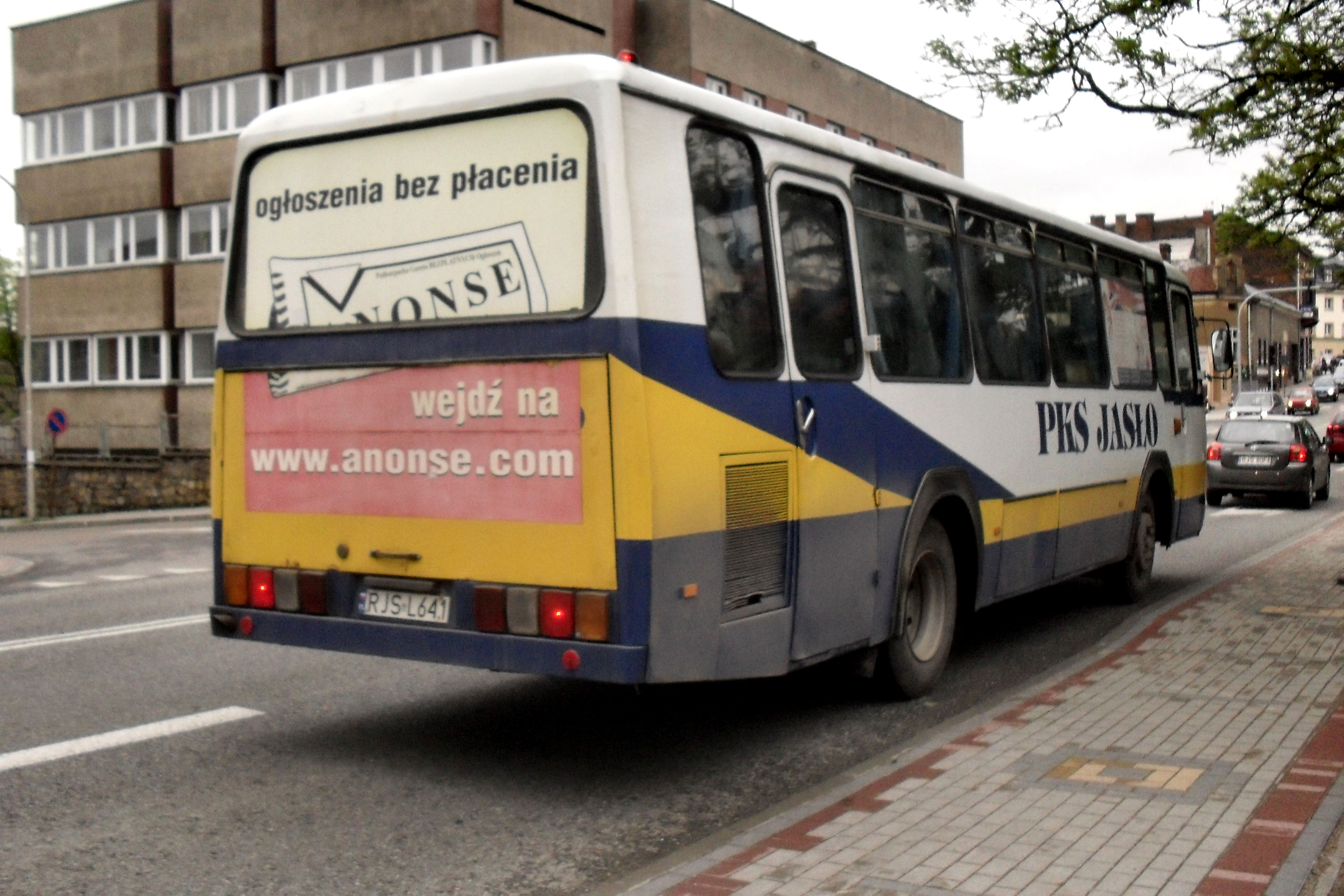
Autosan H10-10P from PKS Jasło

In 1989, due to delays in the development of the Autosan H10-10, a 10-meter variant of the new H10 bus family, and the high demand for simple, mid-sized intercity buses, efforts were made to modernize the aging H9-20 and H9-21 models. This resulted in the prototype Autosan H10-10P. The vehicle's bodywork featured redesigned front and rear sections incorporating elements from the H10 series, including a plastic front bumper with rectangular headlights. The prototype also introduced new front doors, which were electro-pneumatically controlled by the driver and opened outward in a two-panel configuration. The bus was designed to carry 51 passengers, with 41 seated on individual seats. It was powered by an Andoria 6CT107-2 engine producing 125 kW (170 hp). Despite its improvements, the updated H9 family based on the H10-10P prototype never entered production. The only unit produced was operated by PKS Jasło until 2013, after which it was scrapped.

== Technical data ==
	H9-01	H9-02	H9-03	H9-04	H9-15	H9-33	H9-35	H9-20	H9-21
Production years	1973–1980					1975–1980	1975–2000	1980–2002	
Type	intercity	tourist	intercity	tourist		city		tourist	intercity
Construction	framed								
Length	9,310 mm							10,000 mm	
Width	2,500 mm								
Height	2,990 mm							3,150 mm	
Wheelbase	4,000 mm							4,700 mm	
Curb weight	7,700 kg							8,400 kg	
Gross weight	12,500 kg								
Floor rise	980 mm					945 mm		980 mm	
Engine	type S359		type 6C107			type S359	type 6C107 type 6CT107/A3	type 6CT107/A3	
Max power	150 hp at 2,800 rpm		138 hp at 2,600 rpm			150 hp at 2,800 rpm	138 hp at 2,600 rpm 150 hp at 2,600 rpm	150 hp at 2,600 rpm	
Max torque	432 Nm at 1,600 rpm		432 Nm at 1,600 rpm			432 Nm at 1,600 rpm	432 Nm at 1,600 rpm 490 Nm at 1,600 rpm	490 Nm at 1,600 rpm	
Max speed	95 km/h		88 km/h			82 km/h	70 km/h	87 km/h	
Transmission	S5-45, ZF S5-14								
Seating capacity	36+2 seated, 10 standing					24+1 seated, 44 standing		41 seated	39 seated, 12 standing
