= FAS Sanos =

Automotive manufacturing company in North Macedonia

SANOS
- Company type: Private
- Industry: Automotive
- Founded: 1946
- Headquarters: Skopje, North Macedonia
- Area served: Worldwide
- Products: Buses and Coaches
- Website: sanos.com.mk

Sanos (Macedonian: Санос) is a Macedonian car manufacturer based in Skopje, which produces urban, suburban and intercity buses, airport buses and special vehicles.

The factory was established in 1946 as a Yugoslav state factory under the name FAS "11. Oktomvri" AD Skopje, although the roots of the plant date back to 1930 when the factory was a workshop for repair and production with more than 30 workers. In 1967, the then Sanos Bus Factory started cooperation with a Yugoslav producer, as a result of which 15 prototype Sanos A9 models were created in Poland in Sanos A9. Under the brand Sanos, the factory had produced all types of buses, medium buses, vehicles, special vehicles, airport buses and subcontracting successfully lasted until 2001, when production was temporarily halted.

In April 2004, the company Unitires bought the factory due to their experience in the production of auto-moto industry, the factory was quickly restarted under the new name for the Bus Factory and Vehicles, FAS Sanos and production was restored and modernized scoring quality that falls within the world standards in the production of buses and vehicles.

== Capacity ==
The maximum capacity of the factory is 1500 buses annually.

== Products ==
Model	S-404	S-715	S-403	S-608	S-415	S-213
Class	luxurious tourist	luxurious coach	luxurious tourist	Minibus	intercity bus	City Coach
Seats	51+2	49+2	51+2	31+2	53+2	36+1
Engine power	428 hp	422 hp	428 hp	170 hp	310 hp	310 hp
