= Kassel kerb =

Type of kerb used at bus stops

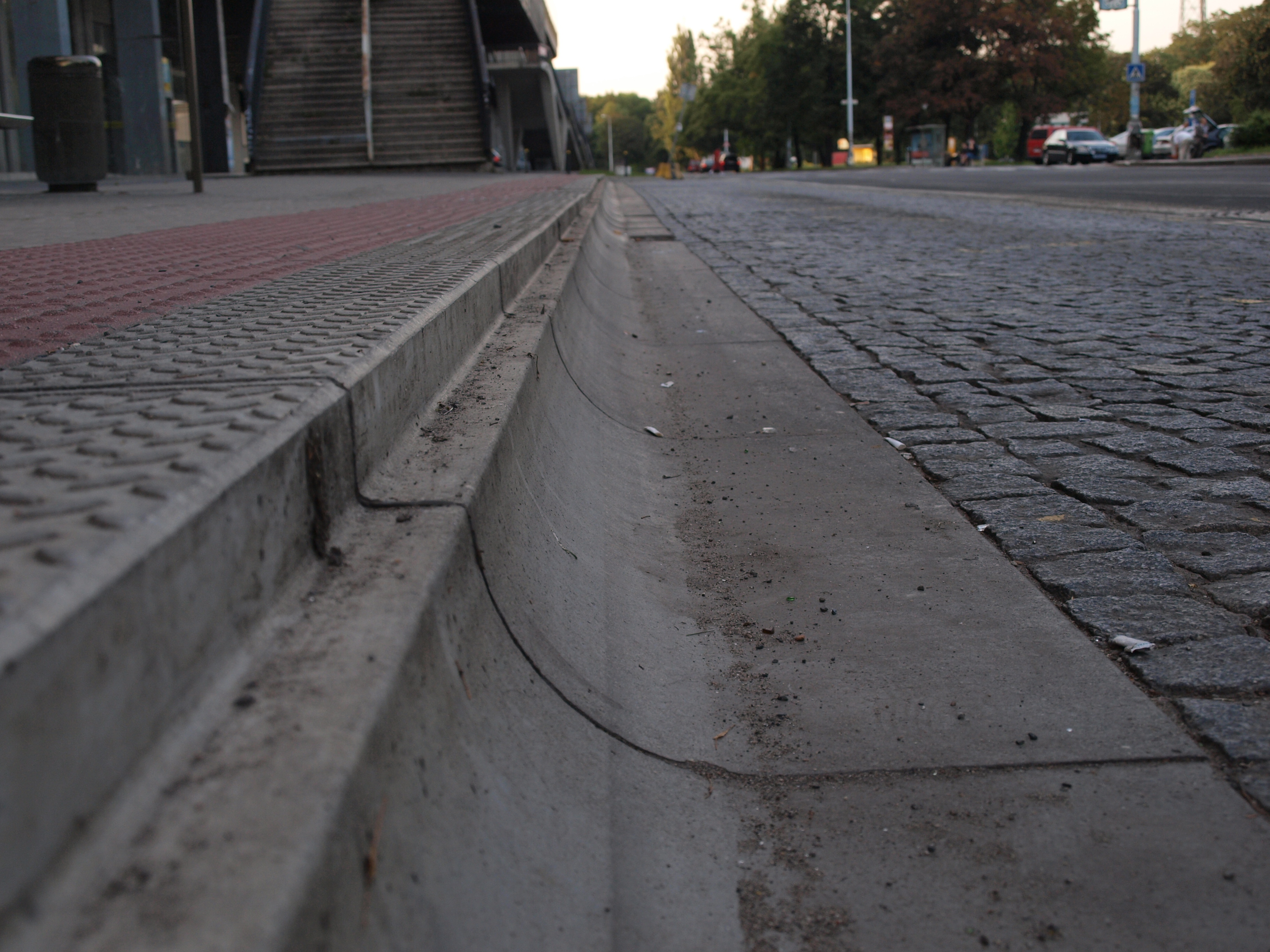
A Kassel kerb. The rounded section allows a tyre to ride up and realign itself.

A Kassel kerb is a design of kerb (curb in US English) that features a concave-section that allows for an easier alignment for buses. The kerb was first introduced in the German city of Kassel for the low-floor tram system but has since been adopted for use at traffic stops. Kassel kerbs can be part of a bus stop kerb, designed for low-floor buses that serve an elevated bus stop platform.

== History ==
=== Low-floor bus development ===
The invention of special kerbs for low-floor buses is connected with the introduction of low-floor buses and modern low-floor trams in the late 20th century. The German NEOPLAN Bus GmbH had designed the first bus with a "low-entry section" in 1976 but it was not accepted well in the market.

Since the 1980s, the Association of German Transport Companies invested into the design for a new standard bus, the "Standard-Linienbus II", with the second-generation Neoplan N 416 from 1982 to find wider acceptance.

Shortly later, MAN's competitor Daimler was designing the Mercedes-Benz O405 in 1984 to fit with the new Standard-Bus requirements, and this model spread quickly in the market in the late 1980s.

Based on the Standard-Bus model, a number of variants were developed by their respective manufacturers – here, it was the Kässbohrer Setra S 300 NC to show the first a low-floor version in 1987 that was sold since 1989.

Daimler began to derive the low-floor version of its successful model in its Mercedes-Benz O 405 N, that was produced since late 1989, and which proved to be of a robust design in the following years, leading into rising production numbers. Consequently, Neoplan again developed low-floor versions of their Standard-Buses, named Neoplan N4014, N4015, N4016 NF with production starting in 1990.

=== Accessibility concepts ===
With more low-floor buses being introduced to public transport in Germany in the late 1980s, it sparked ideas to optimize accessibility. The introduction of low-floor buses had reduced the number of steps from two or three to one, but the remaining step was a barrier to wheelchairs. A simple elevation of the bus platform is not enough, as there is often a gap too wide for wheels to traverse.

The parallel introduction of low-floor trams showed, that with proper horizontal alignment, the gap can be small enough to be barrier-free. After the first low floor trams in Geneva of 1987, the city of Bremen asked MAN to develop a low floor tram. The resulting prototypes of ADtranz GT6N were delivered in 1990 and mass production started in 1992 with the first batches entering service in Berlin, Bremen and Munich in the following years. The experiences with that first generation sparked interest to take further advantage of the low floor designs.

The introduction of barrier-free concepts into bus transport systems in the 1990s was successful up to the point, that the German transport companies stopped ordering high-floor designs by 1998 and eventually MAN and Daimler stopped producing high-floor city buses in Europe by 2001—public (city) transport companies no longer wanted such designs.

While the first special bus stop kerbs were using the Kassel Sonderbord, other kerb manufacturers followed the model by offering kerbs that optimize vertical and horizontal alignment for low-floor buses.

== Kassel Sonderbord ==
In 1996, the DIN, the German Institute for Standardization, issued the DIN 18024 part 1 ("Barrierefreies Bauen – Teil 1: Straßen, Plätze, Wege, öffentliche Verkehrs- und Grünanlagen sowie Spielplätze; Planungsgrundlagen" / Barrier-Free Design – Part 1: Streets, Places, Roads and Recreational Areas; Planning Basics), updated in 1998. Kassel had been at the forefront, performing tests with low-floor buses as early as 1992. A simple increment on the bus platform height showed problems with wear on the bus tyres, and the planning department of the Kassel public transport company began to assemble ideas on a "special curb" ("Sonderbord") for their bus stops in 1994. A manufacturer was found in Fröhlich Bau AG in Gensungen south of Kassel with their patent kerb (EP0544202/1993). After its termination manufacturing was taken over by Profilbeton GmbH in Borken, Hesse (also south of Kassel). By 2001 about 16% of bus stops in Kassel had been converted to "Kasseler Sonderbord".

The kerb guides the tyre of the stopping bus, improving the alignment of the doors with the kerb and slightly raised boarding platform. As the tyre rides up the concave surface, gravity pulls it back down and steers the bus into alignment.

The kerb has become a common part of contemporary bus stop design, and the provisions of DIN 18024-1 were proposed in 2010 to become a section of DIN 18070 („Öffentlicher Verkehrs- und Freiraum“, or Public Transport and Open Spaces).

== Dresden Combibord ==
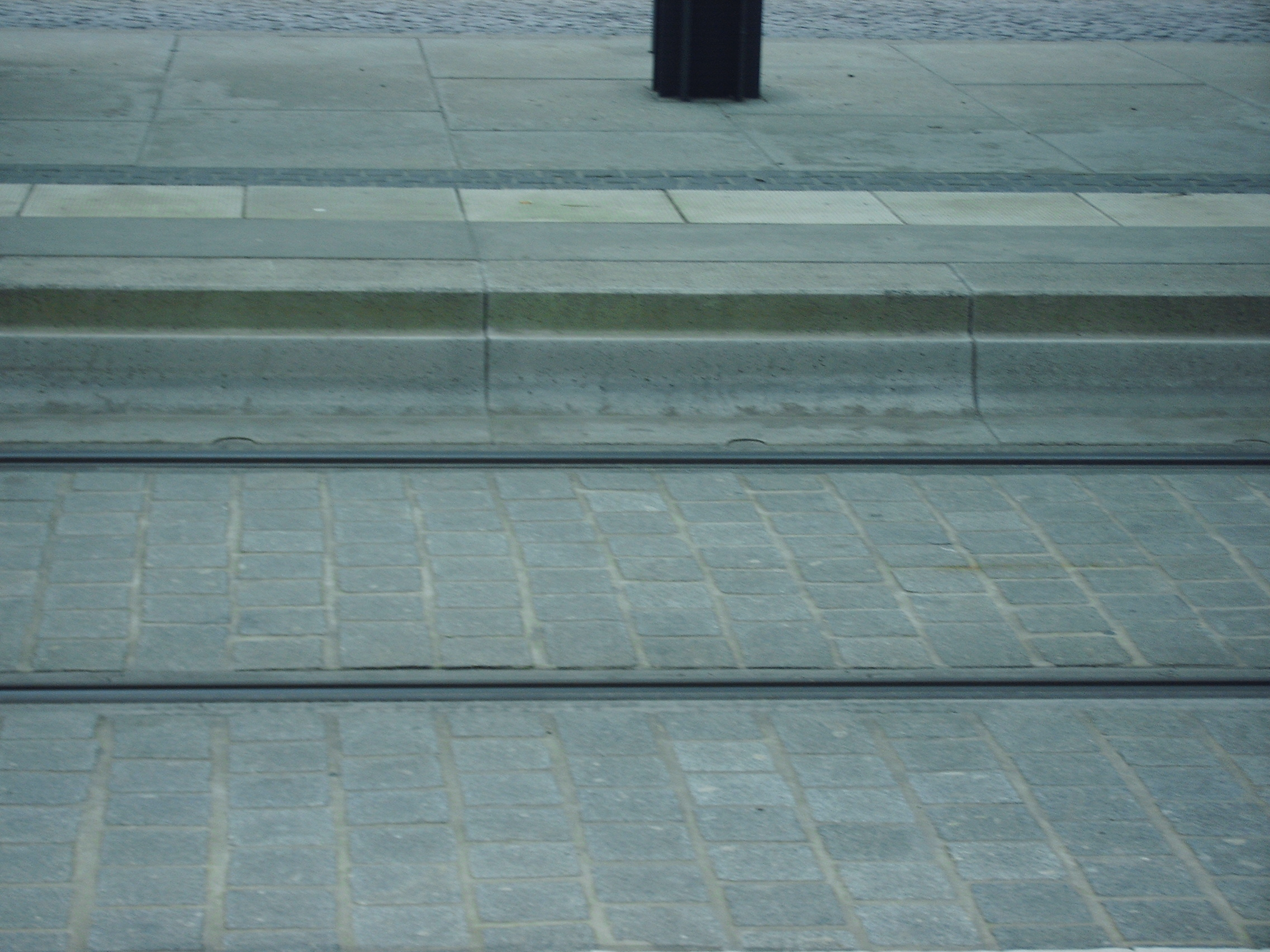
Dresden "Combibord" kerb on a tram platform

The "Dresdner Combibord" kerb is a parallel development, derived from the elevated sidewalks used for low-floor trams in Dresden, Germany. Its development started during the introduction of the first low-floor trams (mode Gelenktriebwagen NGT6DD during 1995–1998) and the Combibord patent was granted in July 1997 (DE 19730055). The round section allows buses to align to the tram platform in a similar way as the trams for level entry.

The Dresden public transport company gives the following reference data:

- minimum platform height at tram door: 230 mm
- minimum platform height at bus door: 180 mm
- maximum remaining entry height from platform to tram: 50 mm
- maximum remaining entry height from platform to bus: 80 mm
- maximum remaining gap between platform and tram/bus: 50 mm
- on dedicated tram stop platforms an accessibility from public sidewalks is asserted with a maximum ramp elevation of 30 mm and incline below 6%

== Sonderbord Plus ==
The original Kassel kerb had been designed for a height of 16 cm above street surface. It did follow the assumption that a higher kerb could lead to collisions of the bus with it. Additionally it was expected that outward-opening swing doors could be damaged. However the remaining gap turned out to be an obstacle for disabled persons on wheels that required often to ask for help / the usage of a ramp enabled by the bus driver.

The United Nations Convention on the Rights of Persons with Disabilities was enacted in 2009 in Germany which led to a reevaluation of the bus kerbs. The original manufacturer Profilbeton GmbH derived the "Sonderboard Plus" designed for a height of 22 cm above street surface. The Hamburger Verkehrsverbund GmbH did build a test station in 2013 featuring a full-length of 39.75 m. It did include an approach section of 8 m length which had a 16 cm kerb after 1.5 m. This was followed by a 14 m section for the loading area having a 22 cm kerb. During a number of simulations it could be shown that damages are possible but they are avoidable. (When the approach was in the 16 cm area or when a steep approach is needed then no problems occur with cautious braking avoiding rolling movements of the bus body). Only a departure steering hard left could make the rear to touch the kerb. As a result, the Sonderbord Plus came into regular use in Kassel and Hamburg, and Berlin took it over in 2018 for new bus stops.

== Variants ==
- The Erfurt Busbord kerb deployed since 2007 has a height of 240 mm. (the kerb in Kassel has been 180 mm).
- The Berlin Combibord kerb is 210 mm above rail (the kerb in Dresden is 240 mm above rail).
- Sonderbord Plus is replacing older bus kerbs to 220 mm in Kassel, Hamburg, Berlin.

New tram generations like Flexity Wien and second generation Flexity Berlin are lowering the entry level height, matching with Combiboard kerbs just above 200 mm. The nominal remaining gap shall be kept below 30 mm vertically for them.

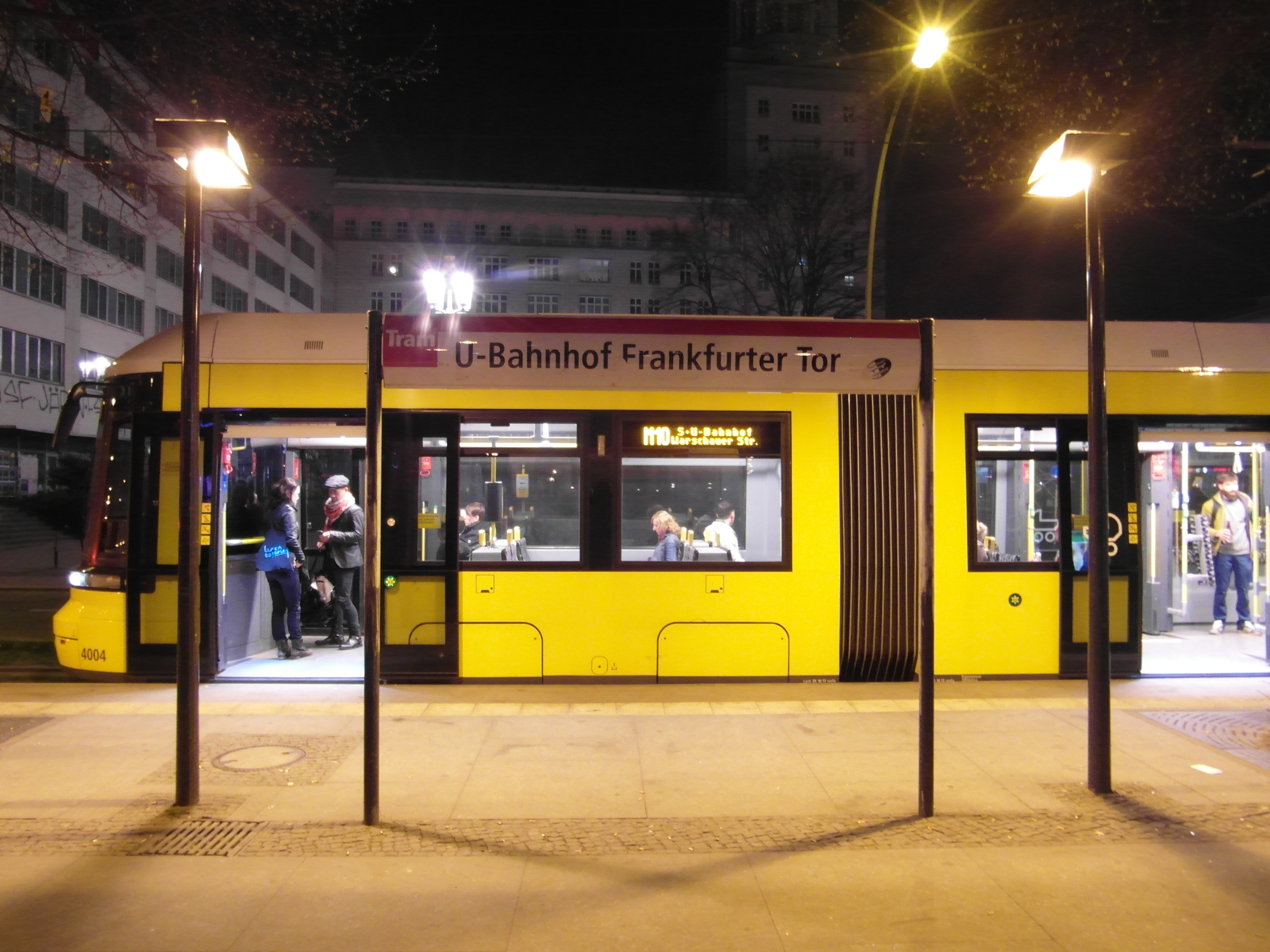
Flexity low-floor tram at level-entry station in Berlin - the goal is to have all bus and tram stations getting a matching kerb
