= Bus manufacturing =

Manufacture of buses and coaches

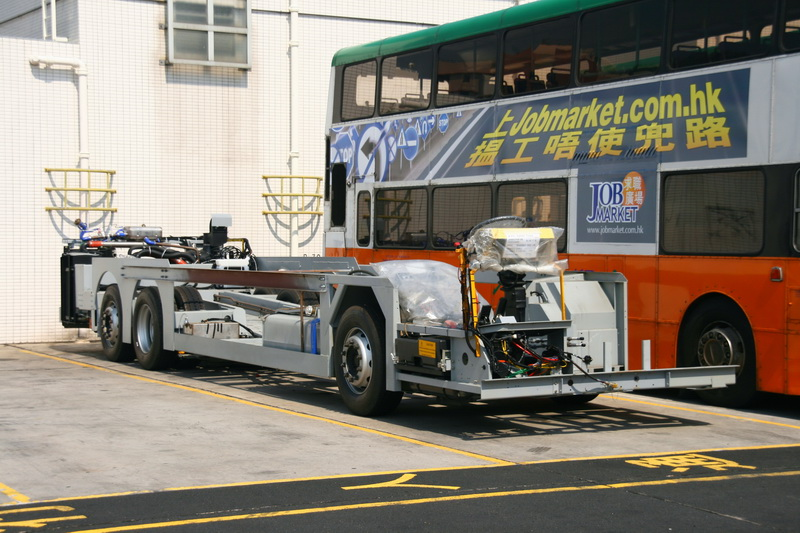
The chassis of an Alexander Dennis Enviro500 double-decker bus on display in Hong Kong

Bus manufacturing, a sector of the automotive industry, manufactures buses and coaches.

== History ==
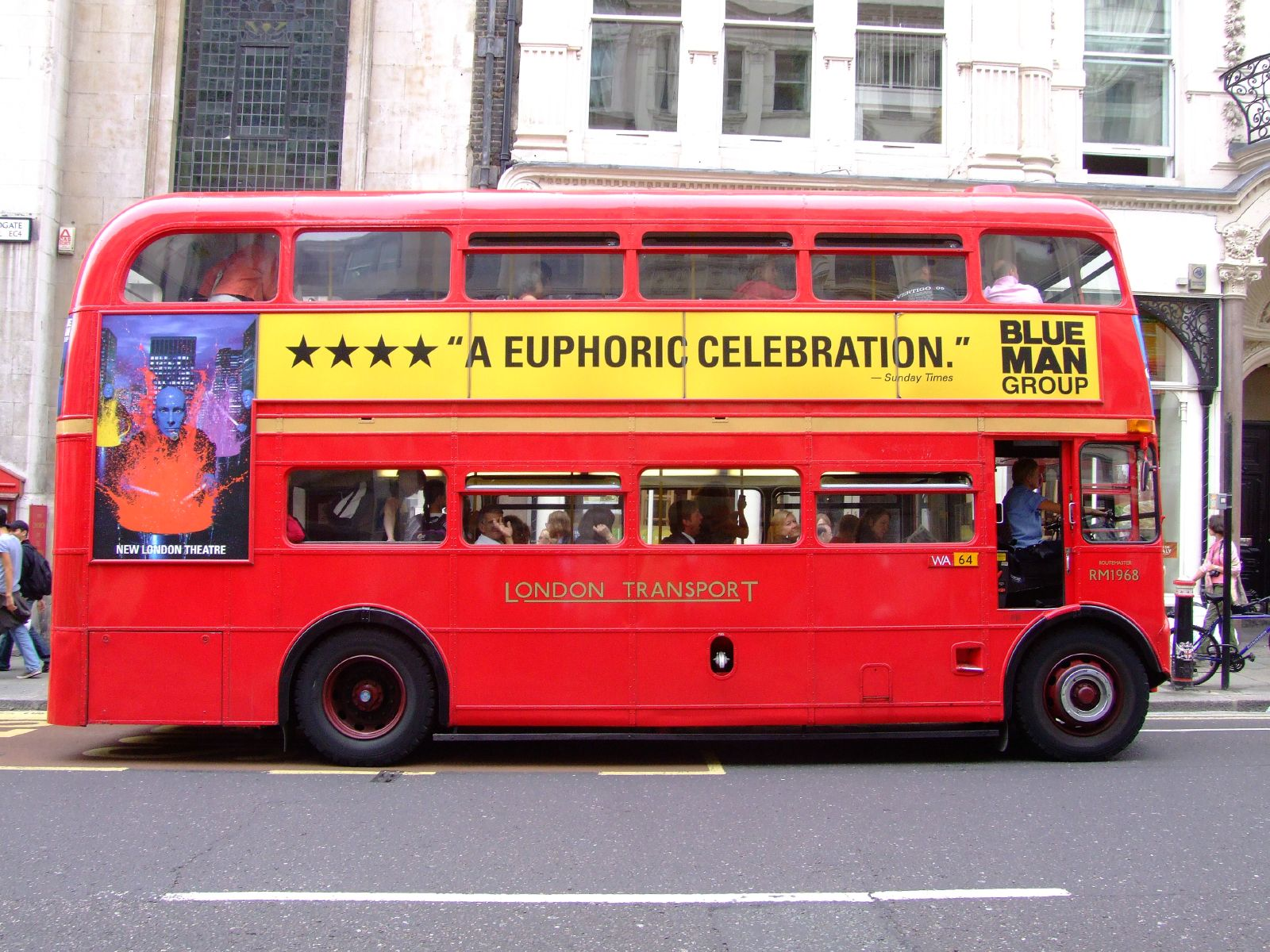
An AEC Routemaster, a pioneering 1950s bus design

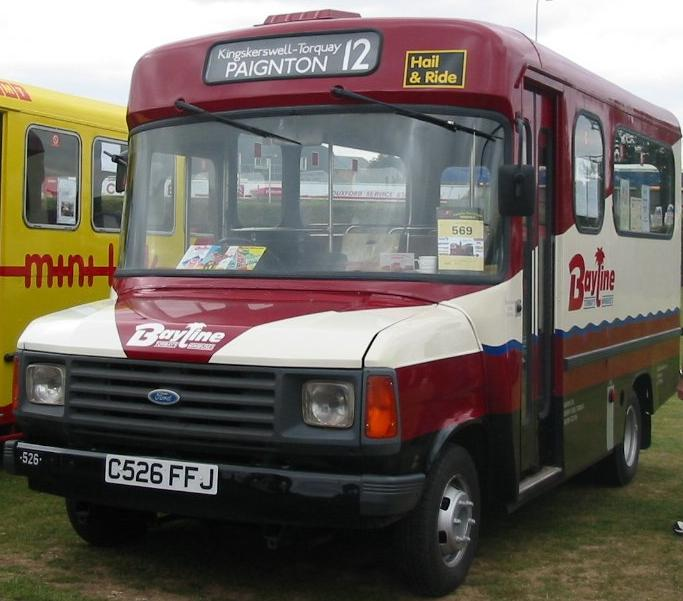
A 1986 van-derived Ford Transit minibus bodied by Carlyle

Bus manufacturing had its earliest origins in carriage building. Other bus manufacturers had their origins in truck manufacturing. Historically, chassis designs were shared between trucks and buses, but in later years specific bus chassis have been developed, and the midibus introduced a lighter weight bus chassis than normal trucks.

Bus manufacture historically developed as chassis and body builds. Often, large bus operators or authorities would maintain separate stocks of bus bodies, and would routinely refurbish buses in a central works, and refurbished chassis might receive a different body. One of the first integral type bus designs combining the body and chassis was the AEC Routemaster.

In the 1980s, many minibuses were built by applying bus bodies to van chassis, so called van-derived buses. Many of these have been replaced by purpose-built designs, although for smaller minibuses this is still an option.

In several parts of the world, the bus is still a basic chassis, front-engined, rear-wheel-drive vehicle; however, where manufacturers have sought to maximise the seating capacity within legal size constraints, the trend is now towards rear- and mid-engined designs due to the lack of need for a transmission tunnel.

In the 1990s, bus manufacture underwent major change with the push toward low-floor designs, for improved accessibility. Some smaller designs achieved this by moving the door behind the front wheels. On most larger buses, it was achieved with various independent front suspension arrangements, and kneeling technology, to allow an unobstructed path into the door and between the front wheel arches. Accordingly, these 'extreme front entrance' designs cannot feature a front-mounted-engined or mid-engined layout, and all use a rear-engined arrangement. Some designs also incorporate extendable ramps for wheelchair access.

Further accessibility is being achieved for high-floor coaches, whereby new designs are featuring built-in wheelchair lifts.

While the overwhelming majority of bus designs have been geared to internal combustion engine propulsion, accommodation has also been made for a variety of alternative drivelines and fuels, as in electric, fuel cell and hybrid bus technologies. Some bus designs have also incorporated guidance technology.

== Types of construction ==
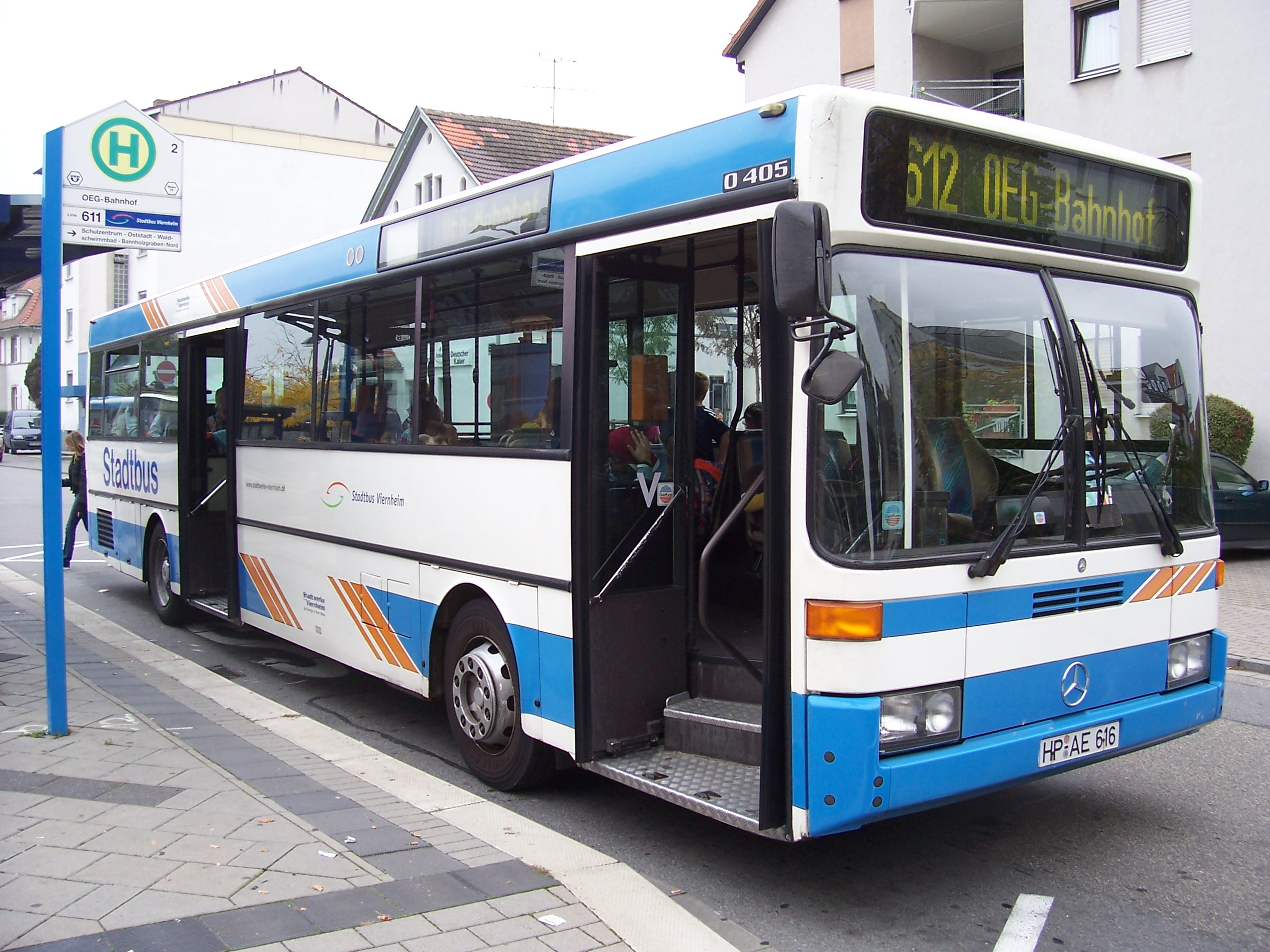
A Mercedes-Benz O405 integral bus

There are three basic types of bus manufacturer:

- Chassis manufacturer – builds the underframe for body-on-frame construction
- Body manufacturer – builds the coachwork for body-on-frame construction
- Integral manufacturer – builds both the chassis and the body of the bus

Manufacturers may also be a combination of the above, offering chassis only or integral buses, or offering bodywork only as used on integral buses.

The splitting of body and chassis construction allows companies to specialise in two different fields. It also allows differing offerings of product to customers, who might prefer different chassis/body combinations. For the manufacturers, it lessens the exposure if one or the other goes out of business. Larger operators may also split orders between different body/chassis combinations for shorter delivery schedules.

Sometimes, a chassis and body builder will offer an exclusive combination of one body on one chassis, as a 'semi-integral'. This combines the expertise of the two companies, and saves the cost of making their chassis/body usable on different products.

Often builders, such as Duple Metsec will assemble products into kits, for export and local assembly at a partner site.

Large users of transit buses, such as public transport authorities, may order special features. This practice was notable in the Transport for London bus specification, and predecessors. The Association of German Transport Companies was defining a VöV-Standard-Bus concept that was followed between 1968 and 2000.

== Chassis ==
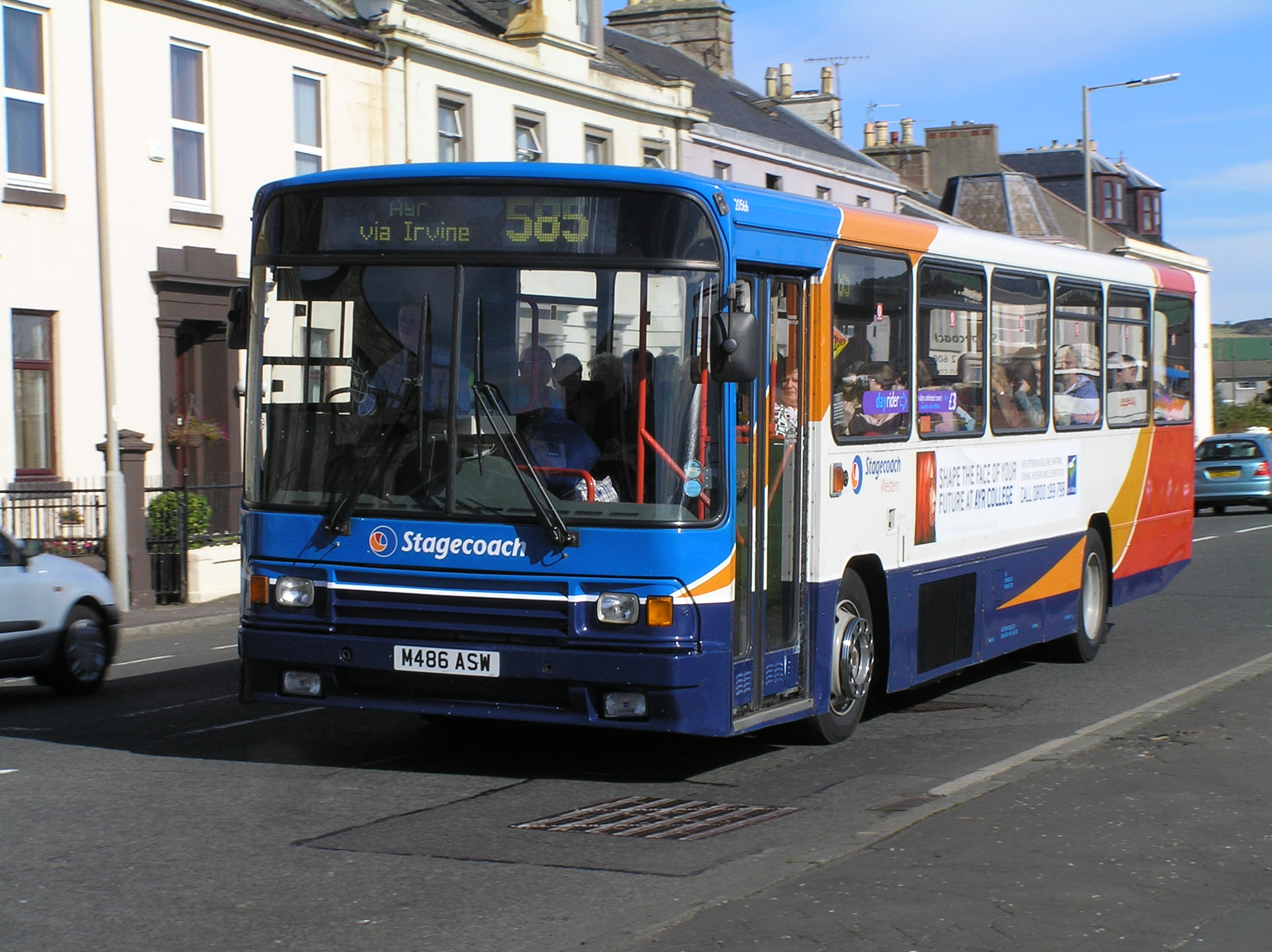
A Volvo B10M chassis, bodied worldwide as a single-decker bus, articulated bus, double-decker bus, and coach

The chassis combines:

- A structural underframe
- Engine and radiator
- Gearbox and transmission
- Wheels, axles, and suspension
- Dashboard, steering wheel, and driver's seat

Chassis will often be built as complete units, up to the point of being drive-able around the factory, or on the public highway to a nearby bodybuilder. The chassis can be front-engined, mid-engined, or rear-engined. Most chassis will mount the radiator at the front, irrespective of engine position, for more efficient cooling.

Chassis products will often be available in different standard lengths, even produced in articulated variants, and often be used for both bus and coach bodywork, such as the Volvo B10M. The same chassis may even be used for single- or double-decker bus bodywork. Chassis builders may also offer different options for gearbox and engine suppliers. Chassis may also be built in multiple-axle configuration.

== Bodywork ==
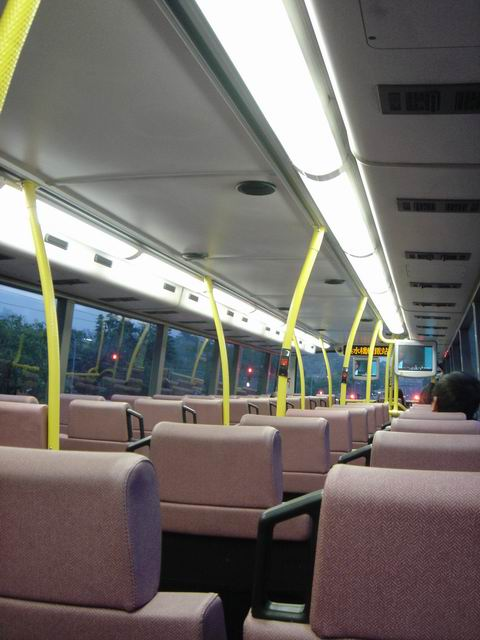
Interior of the Alexander ALX500 bodywork as applied to the three-axle Volvo Super Olympian

The bus body builder will build the body onto the chassis. This will involve major consideration of:

- Usage
- Seating capacity
- Staircase position and design (double-decker buses)
- Number and position of doors

Bodywork is built for three general uses:

- Bus
- Dual purpose
- Coach

Bus bodywork is usually geared to short trips, with many transit bus features. Coach bodywork is for longer-distance trips, with luggage racks and under-floor lockers. Other facilities may include toilets and televisions.

A dual-purpose design is usually a bus body with upgraded coach-style seating, for longer-distance travel. Some coach-body designs can also be available to a basic dual-purpose fitment.

In past double-deck designs, buses were built to a low-bridge design, due to overall height restrictions.

== General design issues ==
Bus manufacturers have to have consideration for some general issues common to body, chassis or integral builders.

- Maximum weight (laden and unladen)
- Stability – often a tilt test pass is required
- Maximum dimensions – length and width restrictions may apply
- Fuel consumption
- Emissions standards
- Accessibility

In the 1990s onwards, some bus manufacturers have moved towards making transit bus interiors more comparable to private cars, to encourage public transport ridership. Other additions have seen multimedia and passenger information systems, and CCTV systems. With these developments, bus designs have been increasing in weight, which is a concern for operators with the rising price of fuels in the 2000s (decade).

== Specialist builders ==
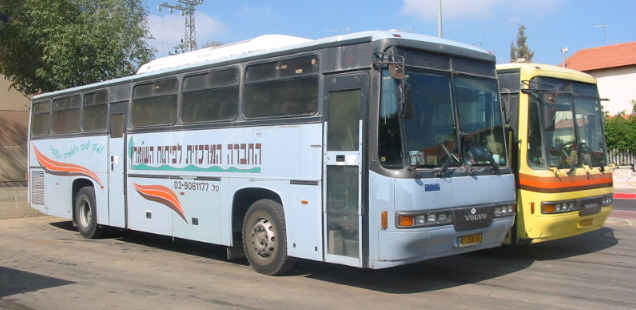
Armoured buses in Israel

Specialist builders may also produce bodies for executive, sleeper bus, tour bus, airport bus, or school bus uses, with special features for these uses. Builders may also adapt standard designs for these uses, and especially for paratransit use. In Israel, due to terrorist attacks on buses, general bus builders have developed armoured buses, and are investigating controlled boarding systems. Armoured buses are also used for prisoner transport.

== Articulated buses ==
Several manufacturers and operators have invested in articulated bus designs, and even bi-articulated buses, to increase capacity without using two decks.

== Identification ==
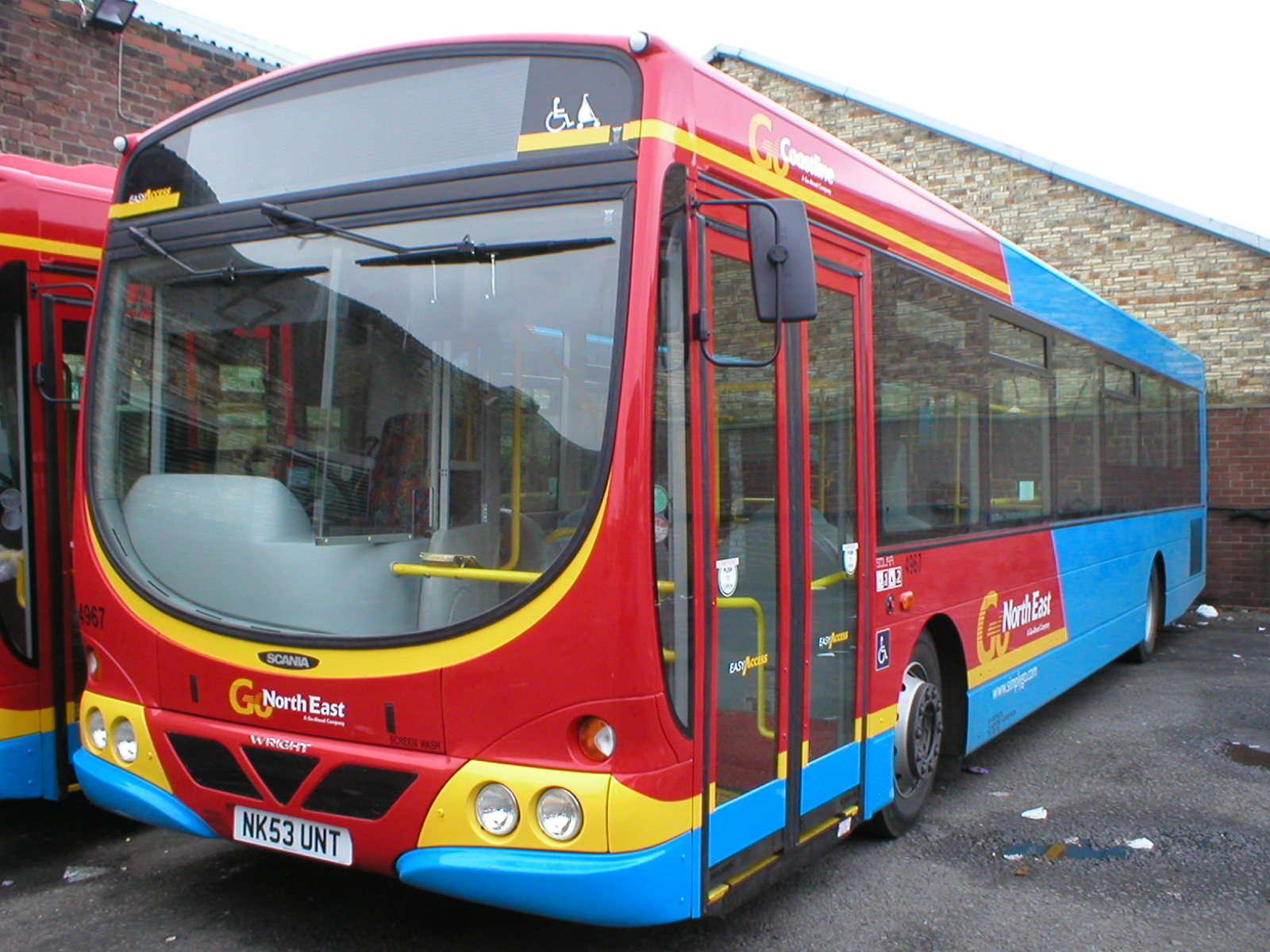
An operator livery complementing the bodywork features

The use of different body and chassis manufacturers can mean one bus can have up to four identifying badges – the chassis maker and model, and the bodywork maker and model, making non-expert recognition difficult compared to the identification of other vehicles, such as cars. Operators may also paint over, or completely remove, badges. Several bus companies have changed ownership and name many times, leading to the same bus design receiving many different name badges, most notably Transbus International.

A further confusion can arise in the case where identical bodywork is applied to different chassis. This is sometimes truly identical, or only different in minor details. Mid-engined chassis designs are often identifiable by a mid mounted radiator and exhaust.

Radically different bus company liveries can cause problems in the application of a livery to a specific design. Many operators will apply a corporate design in the same way to any bus, leading to some odd sight lines. Some operators are more sympathetic, and tailor their liveries to the specific lines of each bus body design in use.

== Rebuilds and modifications ==
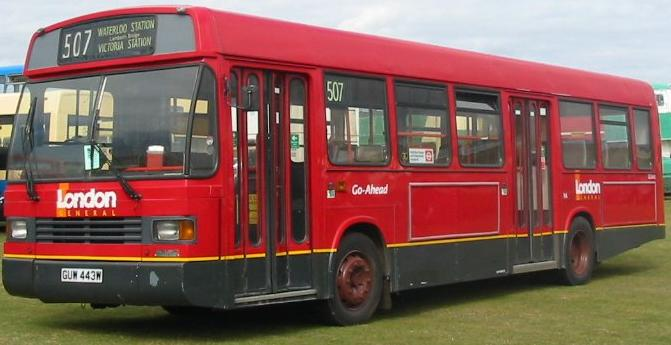
A rebuilt East Lancs Greenway

Often, a bus builder will embark on a rebody programme, such as the East Lancs Greenway, where an existing chassis receives a new body to extend the usable life of the bus. Sometimes this is done by a manufacturer on a piecemeal basis, leading to odd one-off designs.

Sometimes, when a number of buses change hands, or operator requirements change, a bus builder may be required to refit them into the new owners preferred configuration. This can include adding or removing doors, or changing the destination display equipment to or from LED, dot-matrix, or roller blind types.

Some operators will rebuild a buses bodywork after superficial crash damage, or a bridge strike, again leading to odd one-off looking buses where the standard bodywork was not available. Bridge strike buses are often converted to open top buses, or into single-decker bus. Older buses are often converted to shunters, tow trucks, tree-loppers, training buses, or canteens.

== Operator considerations ==
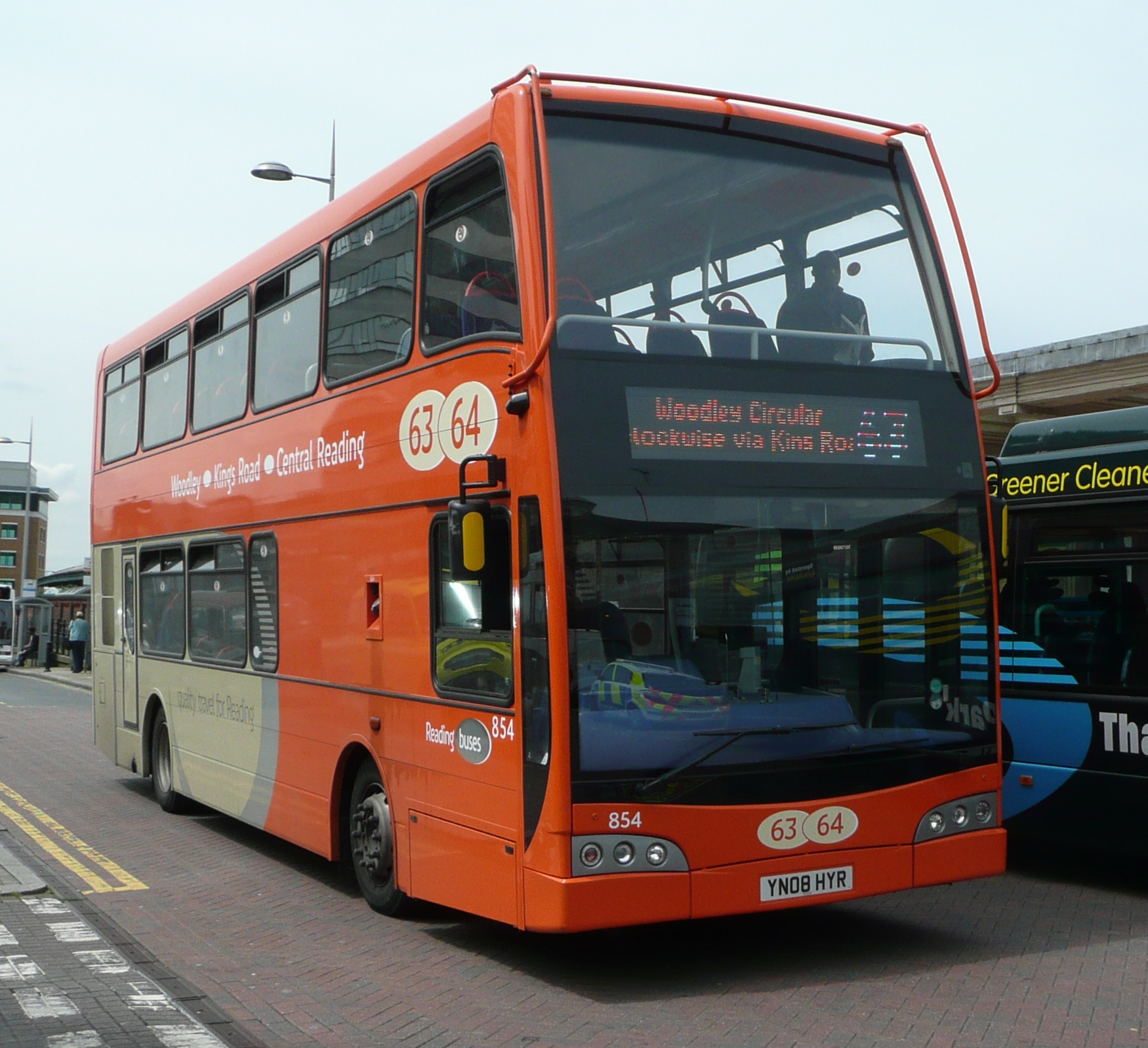
An East Lancs Olympus body with a tree-protection bull-bar protecting the large upper-deck front window

Often, large operators with different types of buses will settle on a standard bus design for their fleet, to produce savings in maintenance and driver training. These operators may either sell off non-standard types, or consolidate them in one operating location.

Operators are often concerned with the ease of replacement of consumable items, such as bulbs, and easily damaged parts, such as the lower panels of the body, or windows. This is to maximise the time in service for its buses, although now builders will offer whole life servicing contracts.

Operators may also make decisions on a particular bus type or components based on the particular terrain operated in. Some hillier areas may select different powertrain options. Areas with many low bridges may have more single-deckers than double-deckers. Operators in humid climates may select air-conditioning as standard. A particular difficulty with double-deckers is trees striking the kerb-side top front corner. Manufacturers, or operators – post delivery, may fit a bull bar type arrangement to protect this part of the bodywork.

Bus manufacturers sometimes provide loans to operators in places where financial institutions are not able to said loans. These agreements usually hold the vehicles themselves as collateral.

== See also ==
- List of buses
- List of trolleybus manufacturers
- Coachbuilder
