= VDV =

VDV may refer to:

- Soviet Airborne Forces (Vozdushno-desantnye voyska)
- Russian Airborne Forces (Vozdushno-desantnye voyska)
- Ukrainian Airmobile Forces (Vysokomobil'ni desantni viyska) Now known as the lit. 'Air-assault forces of Ukraine' Ukrainian: Десáнтно-штурмові́ військá Украї́ни, or ДШВ, DShV
- Verband Deutscher Verkehrsunternehmen, a German public transport association
- Vereinigung der Vertragsfussballspieler, a professional footballer's union in Germany
- "Vérité Devoir Vaillance", the motto of Royal Military College Saint-Jean, Canada
- Vana daami visiit, a 2006 Estonian film
