= MAN SL200 =

German single decker passenger bus

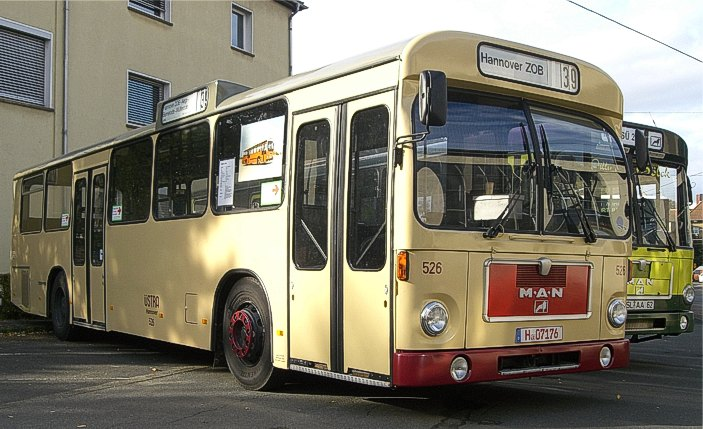

Overview
- Manufacturer: MAN
- Production: 1973–1988

Body and chassis
- Doors: 2
- Floor type: Step entrance

Chronology
- Predecessor: MAN SL192
- Successor: MAN SL202

The MAN SL200 was a transit bus manufactured by MAN between 1973 and 1988, and was based on the first generation German VöV-Standard-Bus body design. More than 5500 units were built of the standard left-hand drive version. There were also several right-hand drive chassis versions available for external bodywork, some of which were delivered with the body frame.

== History ==
The SL200 was superseded by the SL202.

== Customers ==
=== Australia ===
The SL200 was popular with government operators with ACTION purchasing 151, Brisbane City Council 180, the Metropolitan Transport Authority, Melbourne 158 and the State Transit Authority 138.

=== New Zealand ===
The Auckland Regional Council purchased 88 SL200s.
