= VöV-Standard-Bus =

The VöV-Standard-Bus is a standard for transit buses in Germany based on requirements by the VöV Association of German Transport Companies. The first concept was named Standard-Linienbus (standard city bus) which resulted in multiple variants of VöV-Buses. The first generation was conceived in 1968 being in production to the mid 1980s when it was replaced by the second generation Standard-Linienbus II (sometimes abbreviated as SL-II) being in production up to 2000.

== History ==
Post-war Germany had made good experiences with the definition of a standard body kit for tramways that were built onto old chassis in a coordinated refurbishment action. This allowed to quickly replace the demolished fleet with the first generation (Aufbauwagen) being produced from 1948 to 1950 and the second generation (Verbandswagen) being produced from 1951 to 1958. In that time the contracted Duewag had a de facto monopoly in tram car production and other manufacturers had to adhere to the blueprint to be able to sell tram cars in Germany.

During the 1960s bus transport seemed to be more feasible than tram transport but the public transport companies were faced with a large variety of bus models notoriously limiting supply of spare parts and maintenance personal. It was the Hamburger Hochbahn (HHA) operator to ask for a standardization through the VöV in 1959 in order to lower purchase and maintenance costs. It took to October 1966 that a working group was formed at the VöV with most work being done by Falkenried works company, a subsidiary of the Hamburg operator. From the product requirements a pilot series of buses were manufactured by Büssing, Magirus-Deutz and Daimler-Benz.

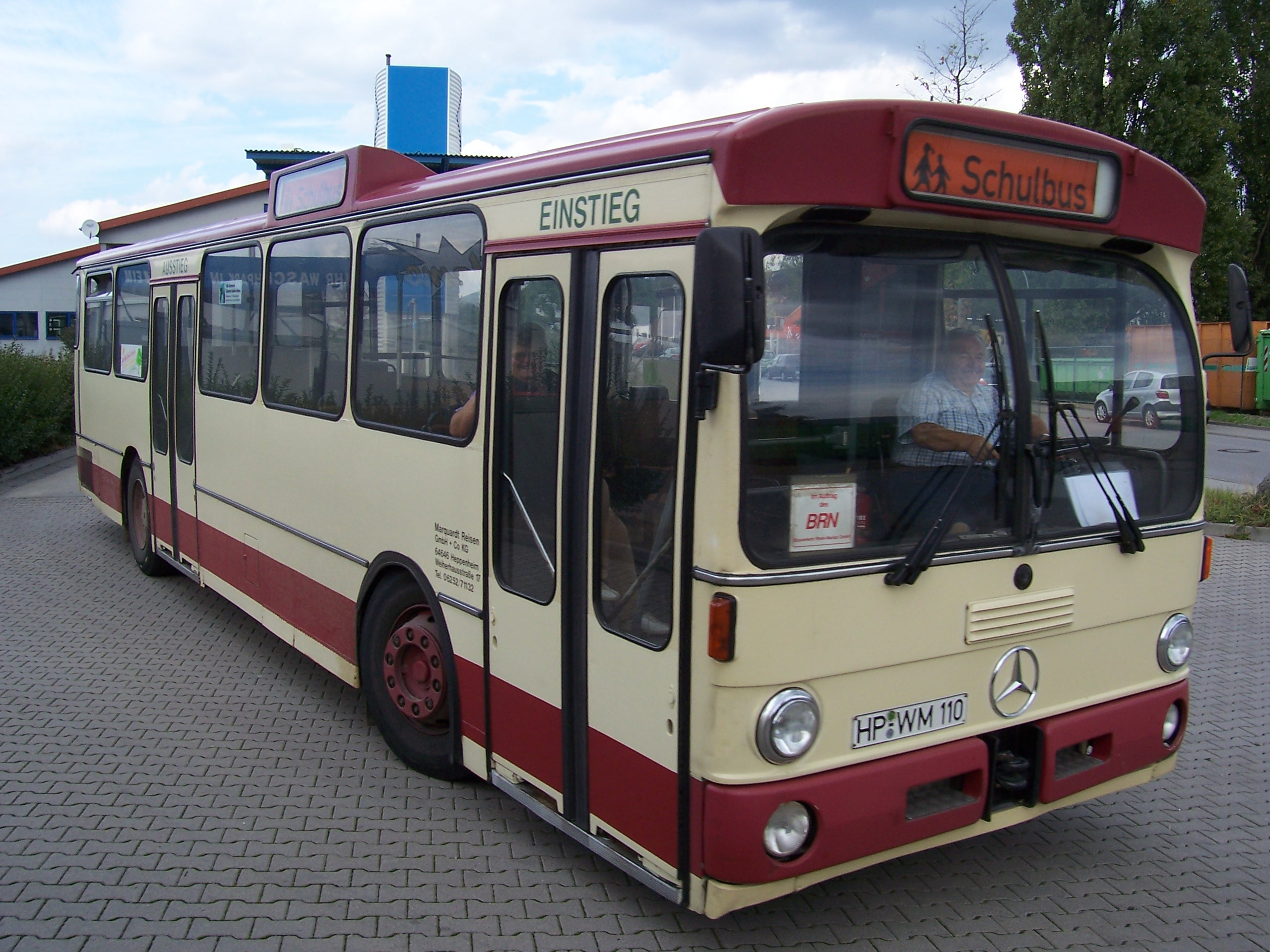
Mercedes-Benz O305 SL-I bus in Heppenheim

The prototype buses were tested from October 1967 to September 1968 by the Hamburger Hochbahn. The practical experiences from maintenance workers, bus drivers and passengers were assembled in a VöV recommendation named "Typenempfehlung für einen VÖV-Standard-Linienbus". The initial SL-recommendation defined a single-decker bus with a length of 11000 mm, a wheelbase of 5600 mm with overhangs of 2400 mm in the front and 3000 mm in the back. There were two two-part air-operated doors each 1250 mm wide. The floor was comparably low at 725 mm allowing for an access with two steps each being 220 mm high. The basic concept was meant for one-man operation with passenger flow from the entry at driver to the exit at the second door near the rear wheels.

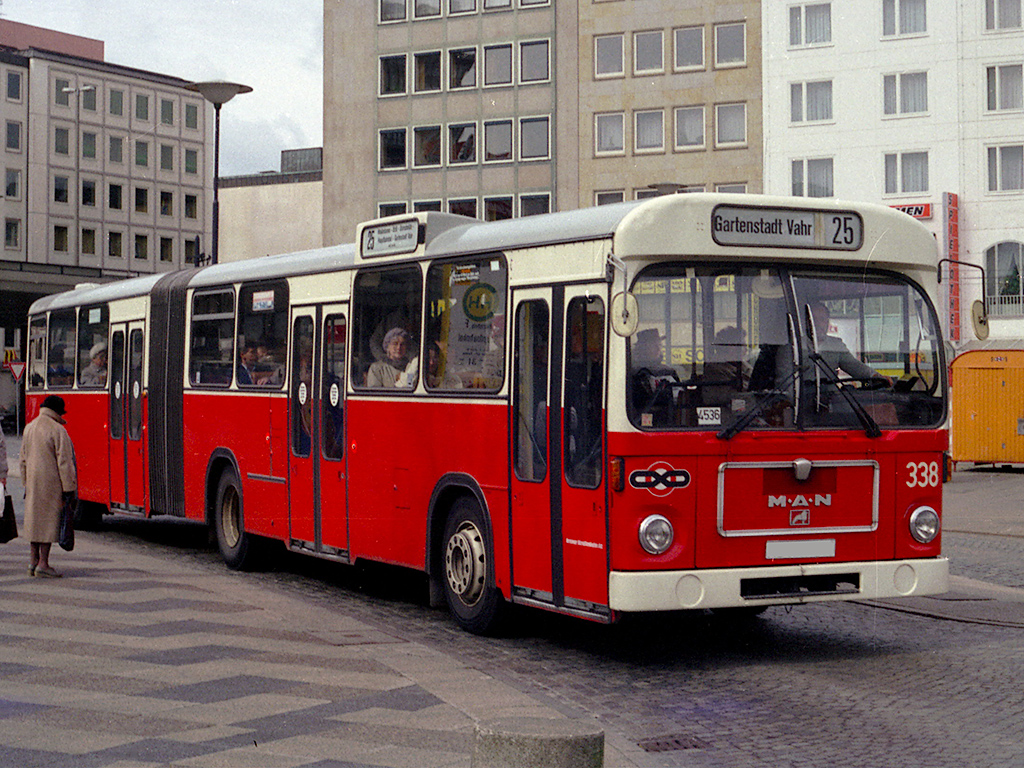
a MAN articulated bus based on the VöV-I bus concept

The design for the SL-I included a concept of 7 windows at a width of 1430 mm, a minimum motorization of 8.8 kW per tonne (effectively 141 kW), and a two-piece curved front window. There were recommendations for seating at 2+2 and 2+1 configurations and a definition for the driver seat including the required cockpit layout (VöV-Fahrerplatz). There were recommendations for the electrics including buttons for passenger use. The concept proposed areas for illumination and spaces for advertisement placards.

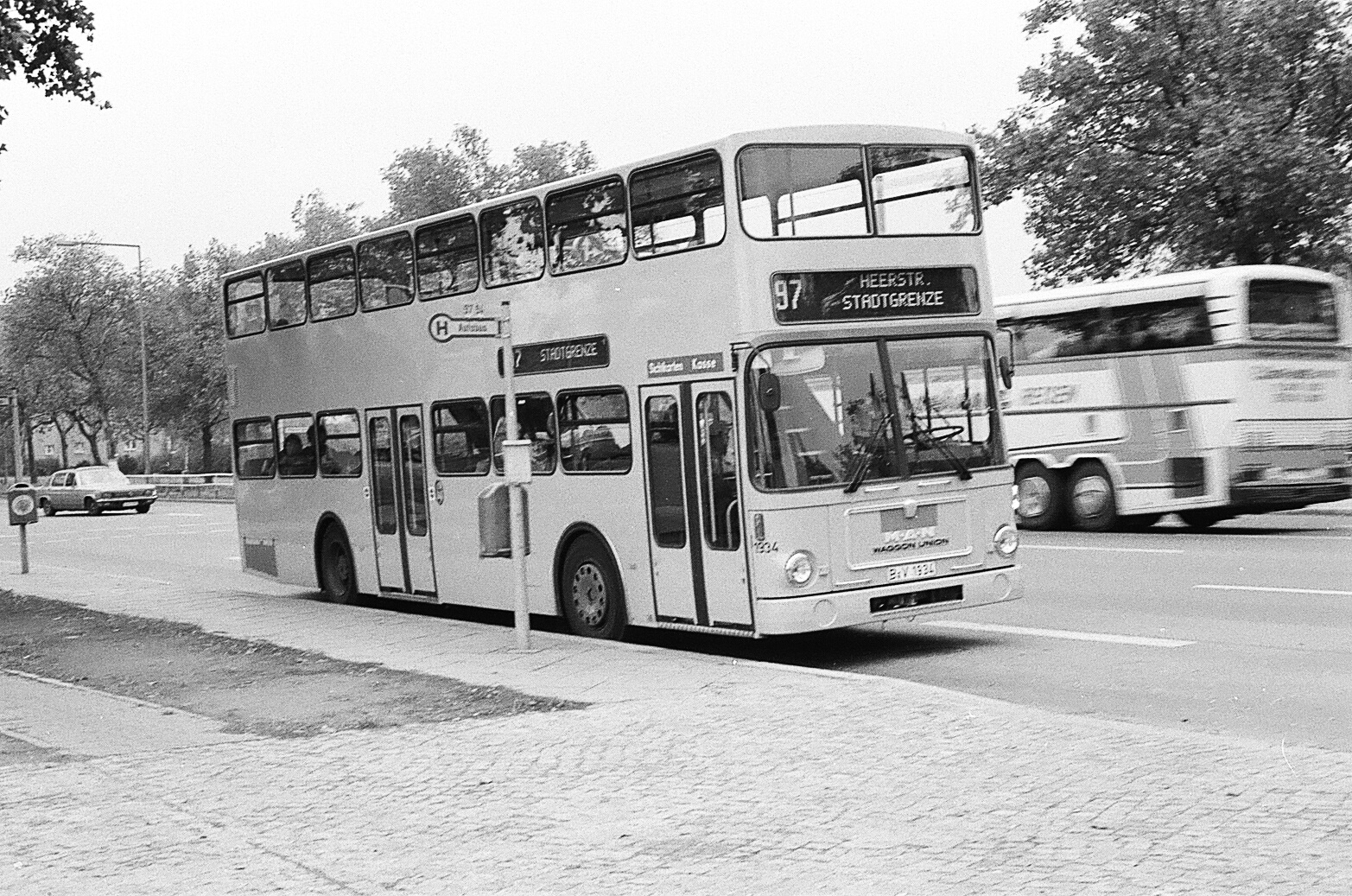
MAN SD200 with Waggon Union body in West-Berlin

While the external dimensions and compartment design was almost uniform, the manufacturers were free in their choice for engines and head design. The manufacturers proposed a number of variants on the Standard-Bus design such as a shorter 9570 mm (with one window less) and a longer 11300 mm variant for suburban services. Articulated buses (first puller and, since 1978, pusher variants had been produced, front section was usually half a window shorter than rigid buses). Based on requirements by the Berlin transport authority (BVG) even a double-decker was derived with the MAN SD200 being produced since 1973. The VöV-Buses proved to be popular with about all transport companies in Germany to use these types and many models being successful outside of Germany.

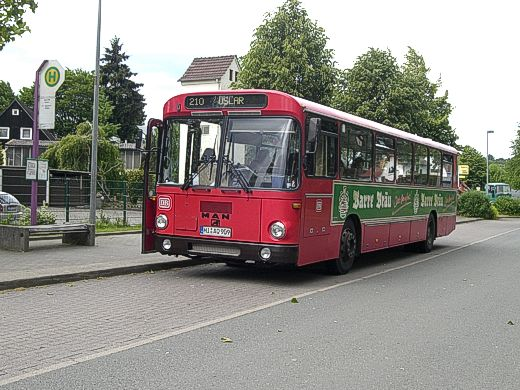
MAN SÜ240 based on the StÜLB-I concept

With the success of the first generation VöV-Bus the transport authorities did also want to standardize the regional bus models for interurban transport. The recommendation for the StÜLB (Standard-Überlandlinienbus) defined a bus being a bit longer at 11700 mm with a higher floor at 900 mm (with a baggage compartments below) and a narrow swing door at the front. Prototypes were assembled since 1972 and series production starting shortly later. The front windows were curved even more allowing a better view so that the StÜLB front was transplanted to a lot of city buses that were otherwise based on the SL-I design.

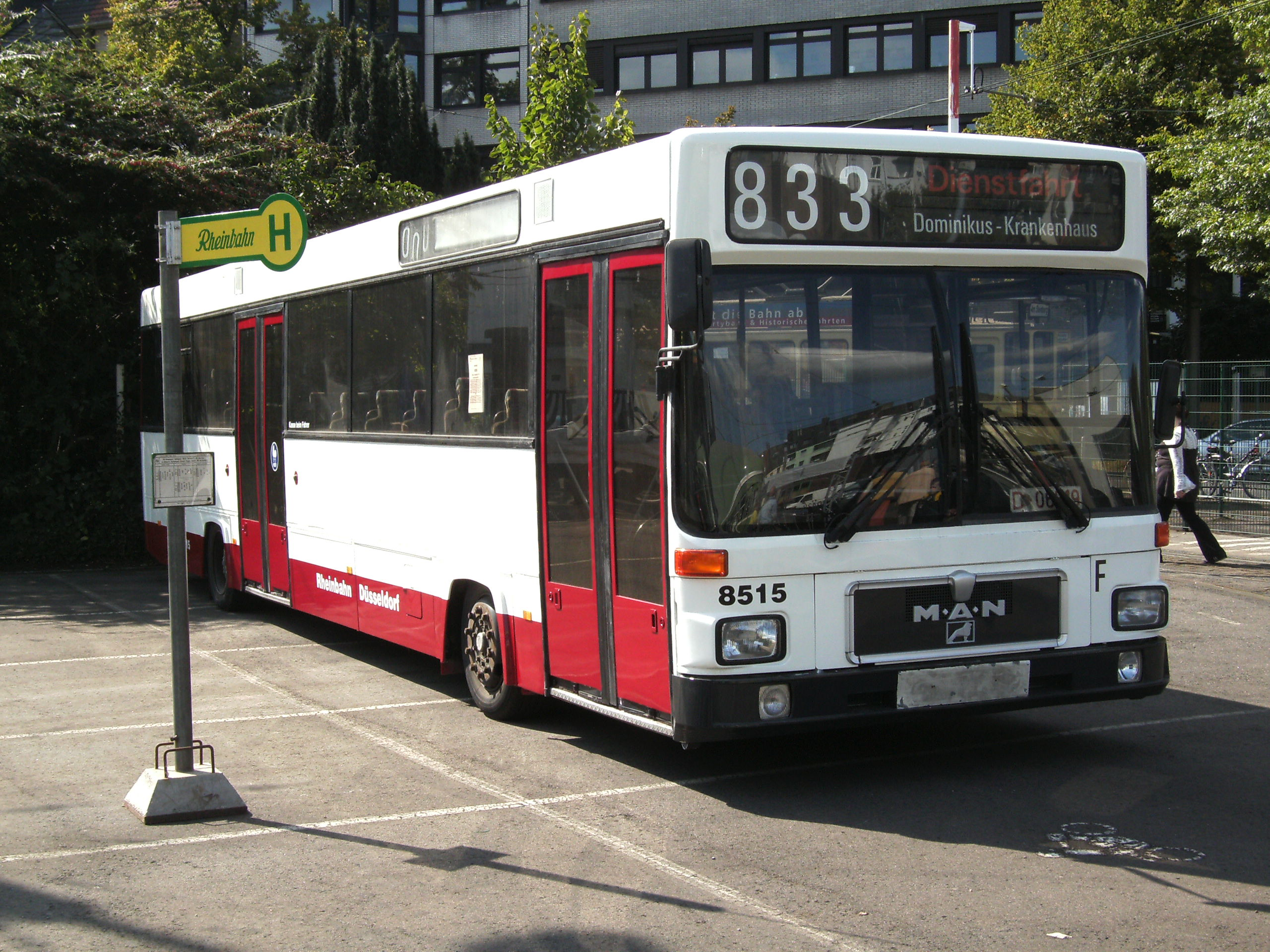
S 80 prototype with small tyres

Since the mid-1970s ideas were compiled on a second-generation standard bus with the floor height reduced to allow for access with just one step. Initially one would achieve that with low profile tyres at 55 percent but in a prototype run (funded by the ministry of research) in 1976 it proved to be a bad choice, so later prototypes settled on 70 percent with two steps. The Hamburg transport authority had to order 22 prototypes of the "S 80" series (named standard bus for the 1980s) to refine the concept. The models were tested for two years by 8 different transport companies in Germany until the second generation standard bus was settled.

The recommendation for the "Typenempfehlung für einen VÖV-Standard-Linienbus, zweite Generation" defined a length of 11475 mm with a floor height of 710 accessible by two step being now 195 mm high. A prototype for articulated variant was produced in 1982 and tested in Düsseldorf. The production for the SL-II buses started in 1984 with the models from Neoplan (N416) and Daimler-Benz (O405).

The interurban bus type was also given a second generation with prototypes for the "Ü 80" series (named after standard cross-country bus for the 1980s) being produced since 1979. The design had a length of 11810 mm with a floor height of 760 mm at the front rising to 860 mm in the mid of the vehicle. It had two steps at 190 mm or 240 mm each. Production started in 1982 with the Mercedes-Benz O407 and in 1987 with the MAN SÜ242.

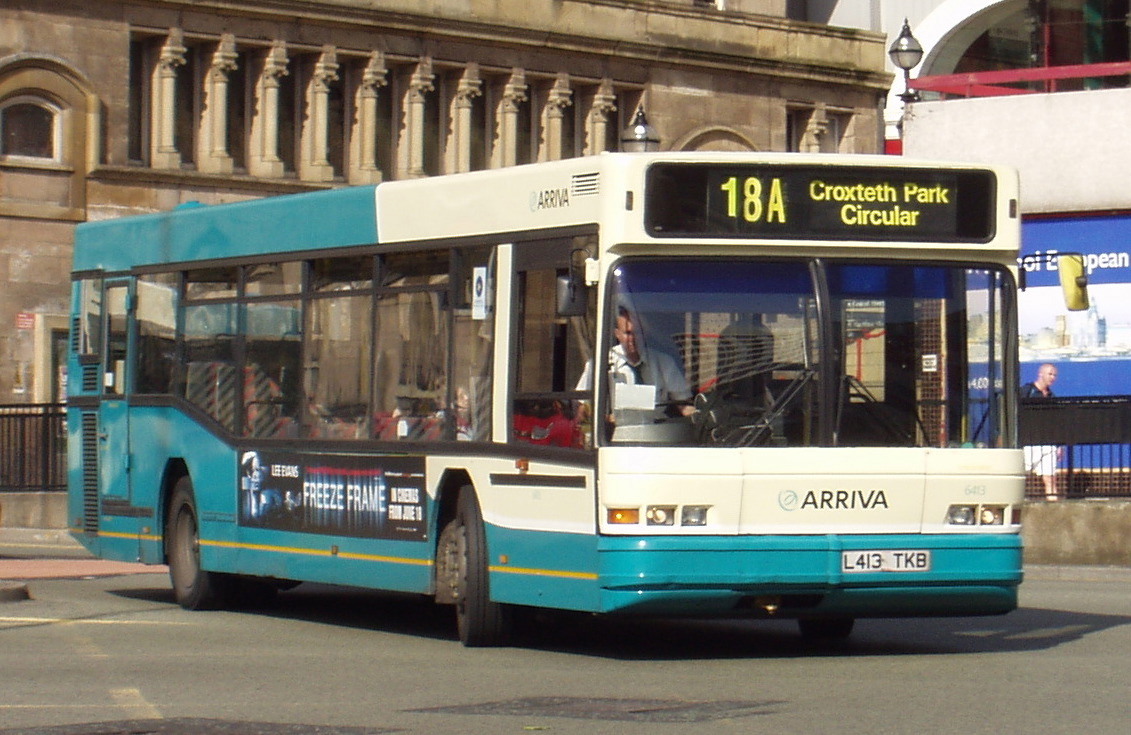
Arriva North West & Wales Neoplan N4016 in Liverpool, England

The second generation VöV-Buses did not prove as successful outside of Germany as the earlier generation. However the initial concept was based on ideas for a low-floor bus type as Auwärter Neoplan had been showing this possibility with the N416 in 1976. In the late 1980s the manufacturers started to test low-floor variants based on the SL-II concept leading to the Mercedes-Benz O405N and MAN NL202 being both in production since 1989. Also Auwärter started to produce low-floor variants of the Neoplan N4014, N4014, N4016 bus models which were successful on the international market.

The low-floor variants were sometimes named VöV-III but actually the VöV had no part in the development. However the low-floor variants proved to be more successful with the public transport companies organized in the VöV (named VdV after 1991) as much as that the high-floor SL-II variants being taken out of production - MAN stopped production of high-floor SL-II in 1996 and Daimler-Benz stopped the high-floor SL-II production in Germany in 2001. Effectively the German transport authorities have been mostly buying "non-standard" bus types since about 1997 and the German Standard-Bus concept ended de facto by 2000. However the influence of the concept is still visible in later models like the Mercedes-Benz Citaro and Neoplan Centroliner.

== Bus models ==
The naming scheme does often include L / SL for the standard city bus (Standard-Linienbus), Ü / SÜ for the interurban bus type (Standard-Überlandbus) and G / SG for articulated buses (Standard-Gelenkbus) with 3 doors. A midibus variant has a single door. An attached N / NF stands for low-floor variants (Niederflurbus), while E / LE stands for a low entry section. An additional D may refer to a double decker (Doppeldecker) and an additional H may highlight a rear motor (Heckmotor).

=== First Generation (SL-I) ===
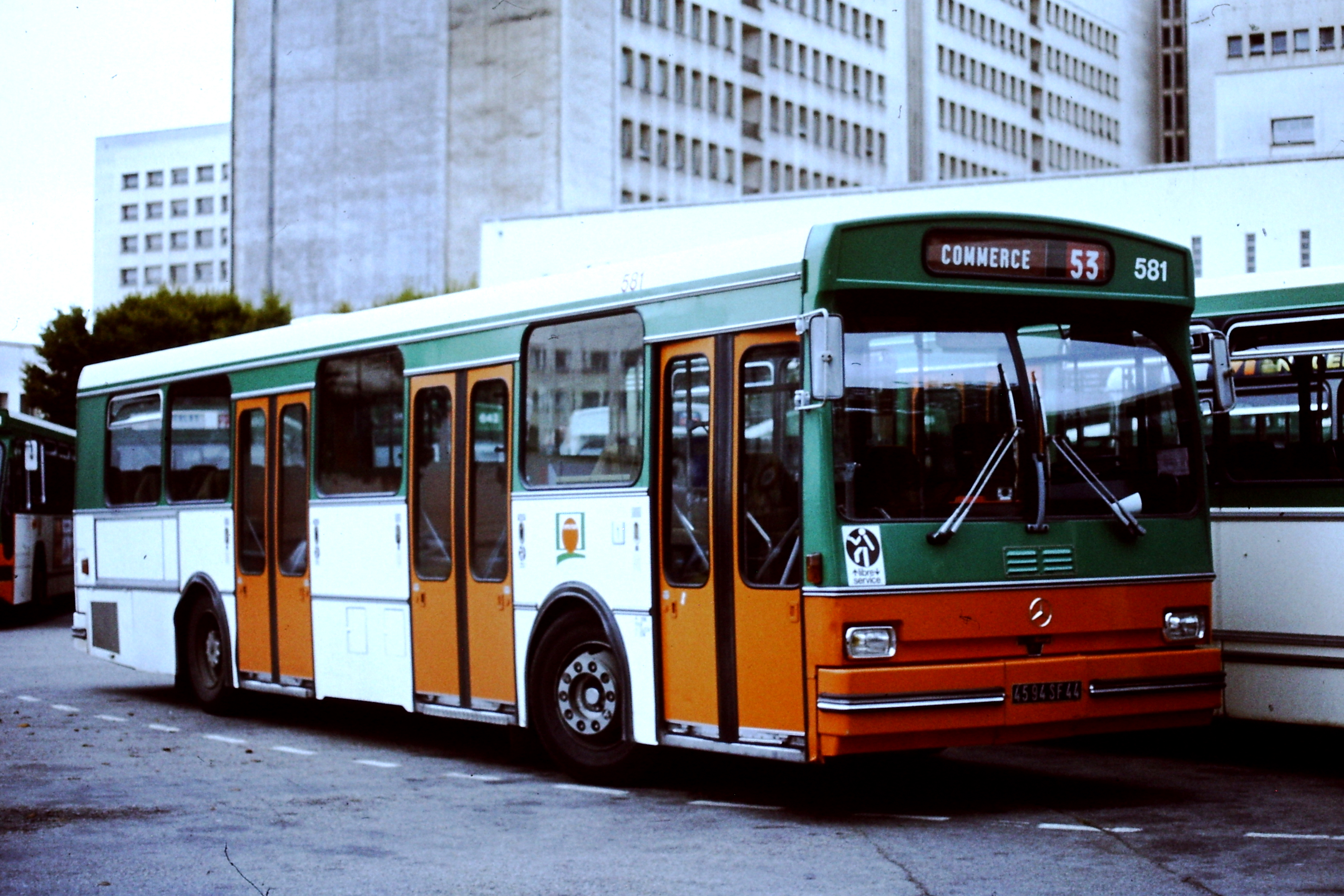
Heuliez O305 in France

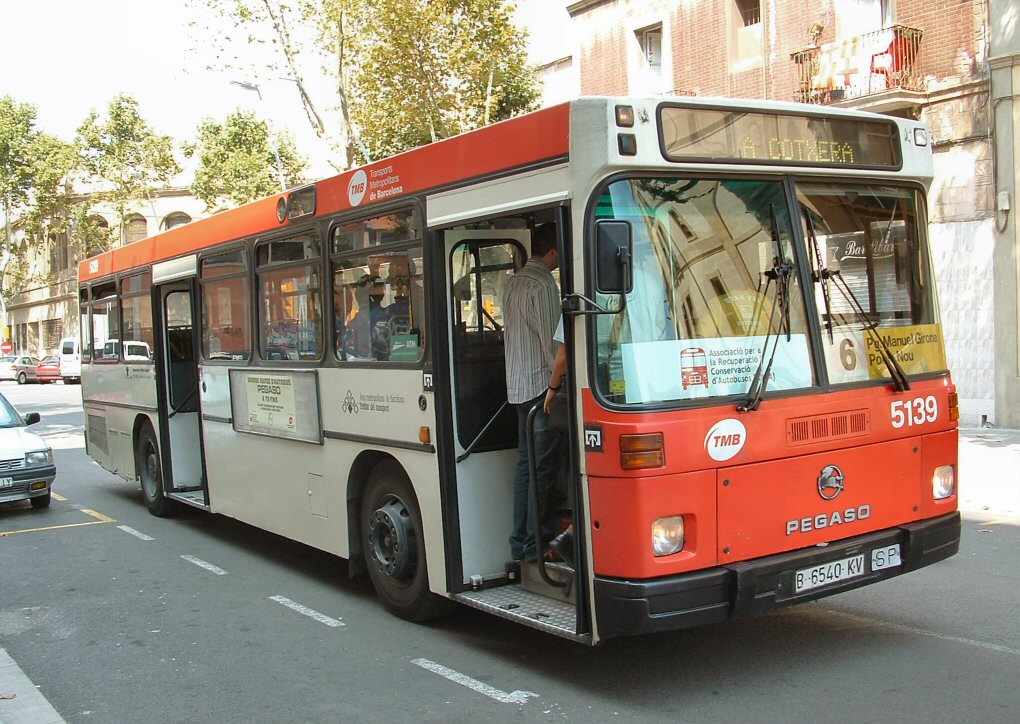
Spanish Pegaso 6420 in Barcelona

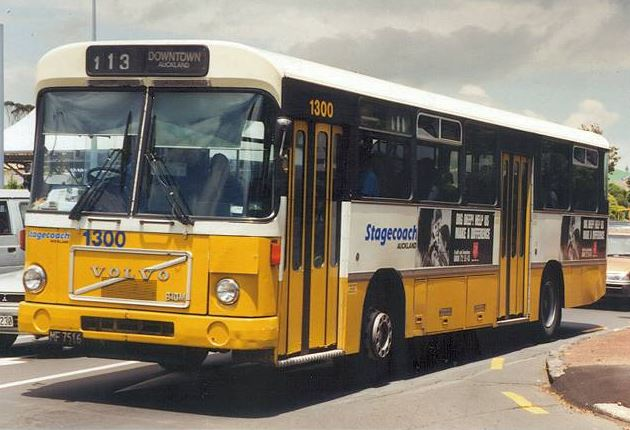
Volvo B10M with VöV MAN-like-body in New Zealand

- Büssing AG: Präfekt 11 Standard, Präfekt 13 Standard, Präfekt 14D Standard, BS 100 V, BS 110 V, BS 117 SÜ
- Magirus-Deutz: M 170 S 11 H, M 170 S 10 H, M 170 SH 110, M 200 SH 110, M 230 SH 110, M 260 SH 110, M 260 SH 170, M 230 L 117 and M 260 L 117
- MAN: 750 HO-SL / SL192, SL200, SD200, 890SG / SG192, SG220, SG240H, SG280H, GG280H, SD200, SÜ240, MAN / Gräf & Stift SG
- Mercedes-Benz: O305, O305G, O305OE, O307
- Ikarus: Ikarus 190
- Heuliez: O305, O305G (based on Mercedes-Benz models)
- Berliet/Renault: PR100, ER100, PR180 (with changes to front and rear as well as the interior)
- Pegaso: Pegaso 6420
- Volvo B10M Two right-hand-drive buses ordered by Auckland Regional Authority in 1985

=== Unsuccessful semi low-floor prototype ===
- MAN S80

=== Second Generation (SL-II) ===
- MAN: SL202, SG242, SD202, MAN SG242H / SG282H, MAN SG292 / SG312 / SG322, MAN SM152 / SM182 (Midibus), MAN SÜ 242
- Mercedes-Benz: O405, O405T (Trolleybus), O405G, O407, O402 (Midibus)
- Auwärter Neoplan: N416 and N416SÜ, Neoplan N4007SL II (Midibus)
- Kässbohrer: Setra Ü 80 (interurban prototype produced by Göppel)
- Magirus-Deutz: Magirus-Deutz 240 L 118 (interurban prototype, no later production)
- ÖAF: Gräf & Stift GS LH 240 M11

== See also ==
- Buses in London - since 1900, buses have been standardised in London
