= MAN SL202 =

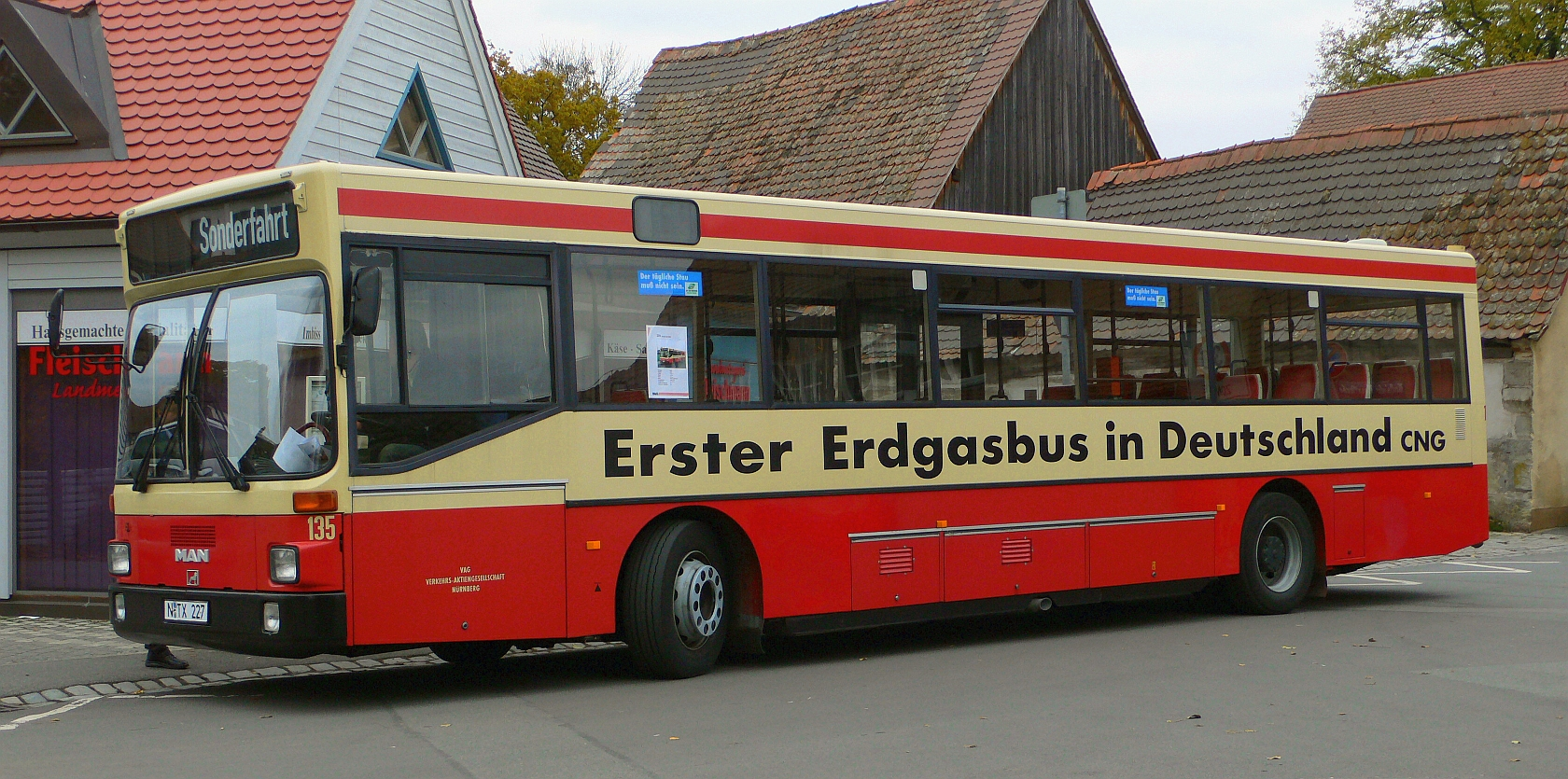
- Stadtbus Nürnberg MAN SL202

Overview
- Manufacturer: MAN
- Production: 1983–1993
- Assembly: Salzgitter, Germany

Body and chassis
- Doors: 1 or 2
- Floor type: Step entrance

Powertrain
- Engine: D2566UH 147 kW (200 PS; 197 bhp); D2566UH 155 kW (211 PS; 208 bhp); D2866UH 177 kW (241 PS; 237 bhp); D2866UH 180 kW (245 PS; 241 bhp)
- Transmission: Renk Doromat Series; Voith DIWA 851/854.2; ZF Ecomat ZF 4HP500; ZF Ecomat ZF 5HP500

Dimensions
- Length: 11.1 metres (36.4 ft); 11.7 metres (38.4 ft); 12.2 metres (40.0 ft)
- Width: 2.5 metres (8 ft 2.4 in)
- Height: 3.2 metres (10.5 ft)

Chronology
- Predecessor: MAN SL200
- Successor: MAN NL202

The MAN SL202 is a single-decker bus manufactured by MAN in Salzgitter, Germany between 1983 and 1993. It was also available as a chassis for external bodywork.

== History ==
The MAN SL202 succeeded the MAN SL200 in 1983.

The SL202 came with a wide choice of transmissions, from three and four-speed Renk Doromat automatic transmissions, to three and four-speed Voith DIWA transmissions, to four and five-speed ZF Ecomat 4HP500 or 5HP500 transmissions. One to date has been retro-fitted with an Allison World Series B300R4 transmission, creating a largely noticeable increase in performance against similar examples with the three-speed Voith DIWA transmission.

The internal combustion engines used in the SL202 were replaced around 1990, from older, smaller, 2566 series engines to newer, larger, 2866 series engines. The majority of pre-1990 SL202s have a 155 kilowatts (211 PS; 208 bhp) D2566UH engine, developing about 755 newton-metres (557 lbf⋅ft) of torque at 1,400 rpm. These D2566 engines have a capacity of 11.413 litres (696.5 cu in) and max out at 2,200 rpm. This same engine was used for the SL200 and is similar in design to that of the OM407h engine used in the Mercedes-Benz O305.

Post-1990 SL202s have the D2866 engine, with higher power and torque figures. These engines have a capacity of 11.967 litres (730.3 cu in) and maximum output at 2,200 rpm, the design is similar to the OM447h engine of the Mercedes-Benz O405.

Much of the design was used in the North American version of the SL202, the MAN Americana SL40-102. The SL202 was superseded by the MAN NL202.

== Operators ==
The MAN SL202 was mainly sold in Germany. The chassis version was sold in Australia and New Zealand.

=== Australia ===
Sydney Buses purchased 50 Pressed Metal Corporation bodied SL202s in 1989 which were retired in 2013, while the State Transport Authority, Adelaide took delivery of 125 Pressed Metal Corporation Australia bodied examples between 1992 and 1996. The Brisbane City Council purchased two while Darwinbus purchased five.

=== New Zealand ===
Between 1986 and 1989, four cities made a combined order for 162 MAN SL202 buses with Coachwork International built B45+27D bodies, built to the German "Stadt 80" design. The cities were:

- Auckland Regional Council with 69 vehicles
- Christchurch Transport Board with 57 vehicles
- New Plymouth City Transport with six, and
- Wellington City Council with 30 vehicles.

New Zealand Coach Service purchased 11 SL202 vehicles between 1986 and 1988.
