= Mercedes-Benz O405 =

Single-decker bus manufactured by Mercedes-Benz (1983–2002)

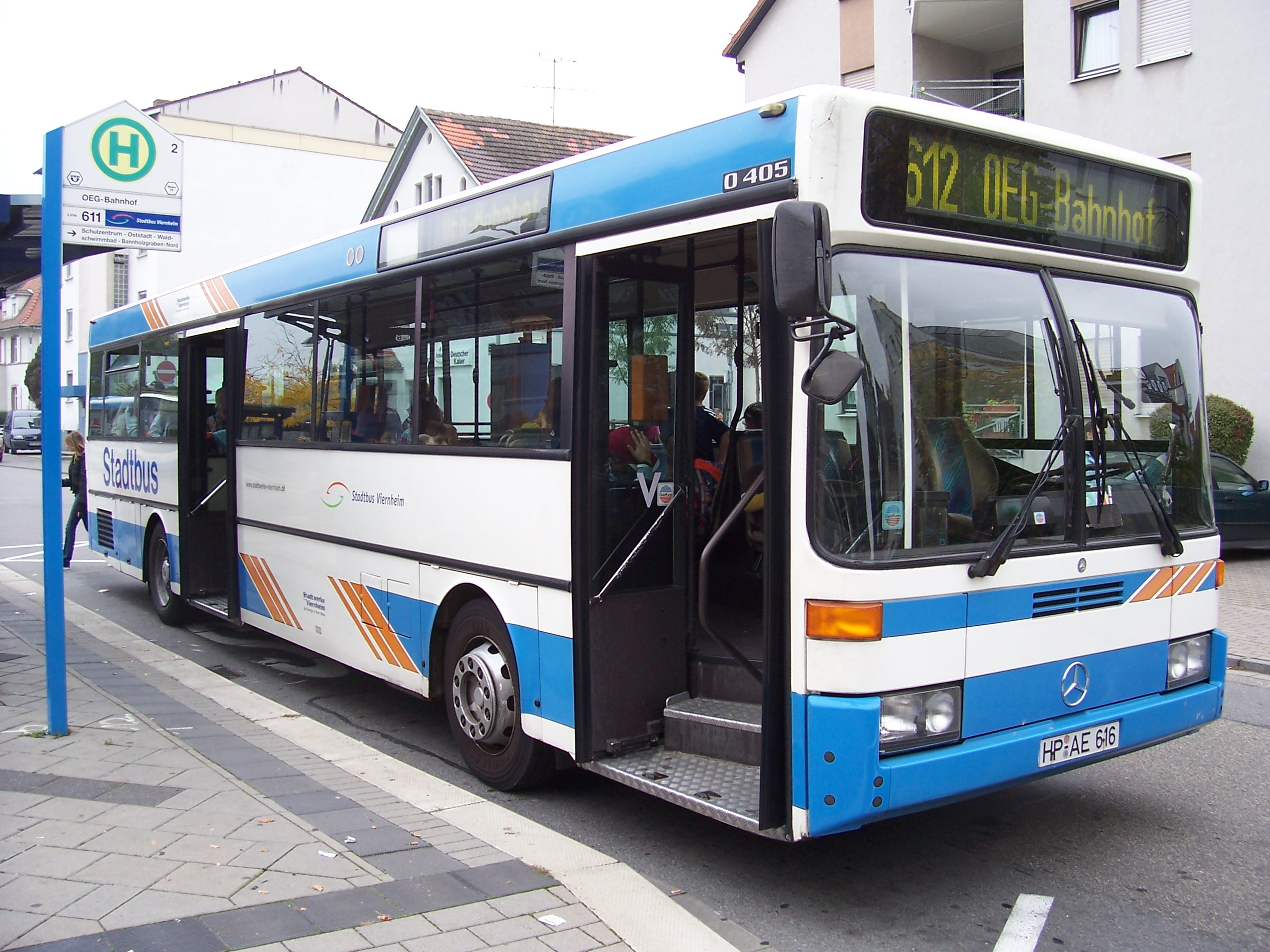
- Mercedes-Benz O405 (integral) in Germany

Overview
- Manufacturer: Mercedes-Benz
- Production: 1984–2002
- Assembly: Mannheim, Germany

Body and chassis
- Class: Complete bus Bus chassis
- Layout: underfloor rear-engine
- Doors: 1, 2 or 3 doors (rigid); 2, 3 or 4 doors (articulated)
- Floor type: O405: High floor O405N: Low floor

Powertrain
- Engine: OM447h (157 kW); OM447h (177 kW); OM447hII (184 kW); OM447hLA (184 kW)
- Capacity: 60 to 104 passengers (35 seated to 61 seated)
- Transmission: Mercedes-Benz W3E110/2.2R; Mercedes-Benz W3E112/2.2R; Mercedes-Benz W4E; Allison B400R; Voith DIWA 851.2; Voith DIWA 863.3; ZF 4HP500; ZF 4HP590; ZF 5HP500; ZF 5HP590

Dimensions
- Length: 11.1 m (O405); 11.73 m (O405N I); 11.91 m (O405N II); 12.2 m (rigid)/17.1m, 18.0m (articulated)
- Width: 2.5 m

Chronology
- Predecessor: Mercedes-Benz O305 (single decker and articulated)
- Successor: Mercedes-Benz Citaro (O530); Mercedes-Benz OC500LE

The Mercedes-Benz O405 is a single-decker bus manufactured by Mercedes-Benz from the mid-1980s to the early 2000s as either an integral bus or a bus chassis; it was the last VöV SL-II standard bus in production. It replaced the O305 and was widely used in Europe, the United Kingdom, Australia and Singapore with 12,000 produced.

== Standard floor version ==
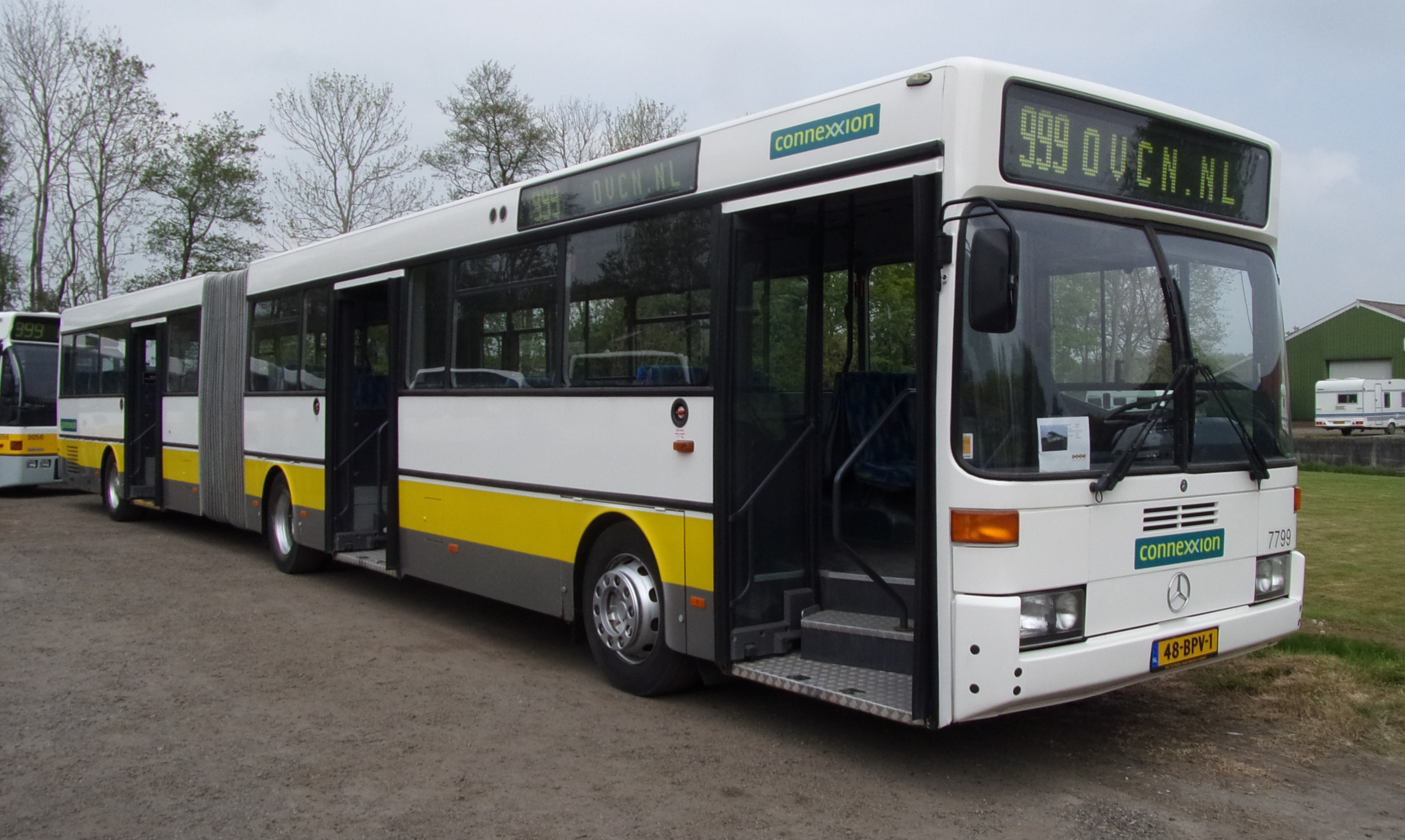
O405G articulated bus

The step-entrance version was known as the O405. A 3-axle articulated version (pusher) was also built known as O405G and a trolleybus as the O405T. There were two generations of O405, designated as O405 MkI and O405 MkII. Most of them have their boxy roof dome (slightly arched) with a double-curvature windscreen, separately mounted destination indicator and pantograph system windshield wipers that was used on many buses such as the Dennis Dart, Leyland Lynx and the MAN SL202.

=== O405 Mark I ===
The O405 Mark I was marketed between mid-1980s and early 1990s. It was unveiled in September 1983. It featured a Mercedes-Benz OM447h naturally aspirated Diesel engine with outputs of either 157 kW (211 hp) or 184 kW (247 hp). Optionally available was a naturally aspirated compressed natural gas (CNG) engine model M447hG with 150 kW (201 hp) output. The gearbox coupled to the engine was usually the Mercedes-Benz W3E110/2.2R or Mercedes-Benz W4E112/2.2R (the former being able to handle the more powerful 184 kW engine), although there have been other gearboxes such as the ZF 5HP 500 or Allison B300R coupled to the engine.

=== O405 Mark II ===
The O405 Mark II was marketed from the early 1990s to the late 1990s and into the early 2000s in some parts of the world. It featured a Mercedes-Benz OM447hA turbocharged engine with an output of 184 kW (247 hp), although some examples feature either a naturally aspirated engine (OM447h-II), a turbocharged engine (OM447hA) or a turbocharged, intercooled engine (OM447hLA). The gearbox coupled to the engine was either the ZF 4HP 500 or 5HP 500, or the Voith D864.3.

From 1994, this chassis was available with the M447hG Euro II 175 kW (235 hp) naturally aspirated compressed natural gas (CNG) engine.

== Low-floor version: O405N ==
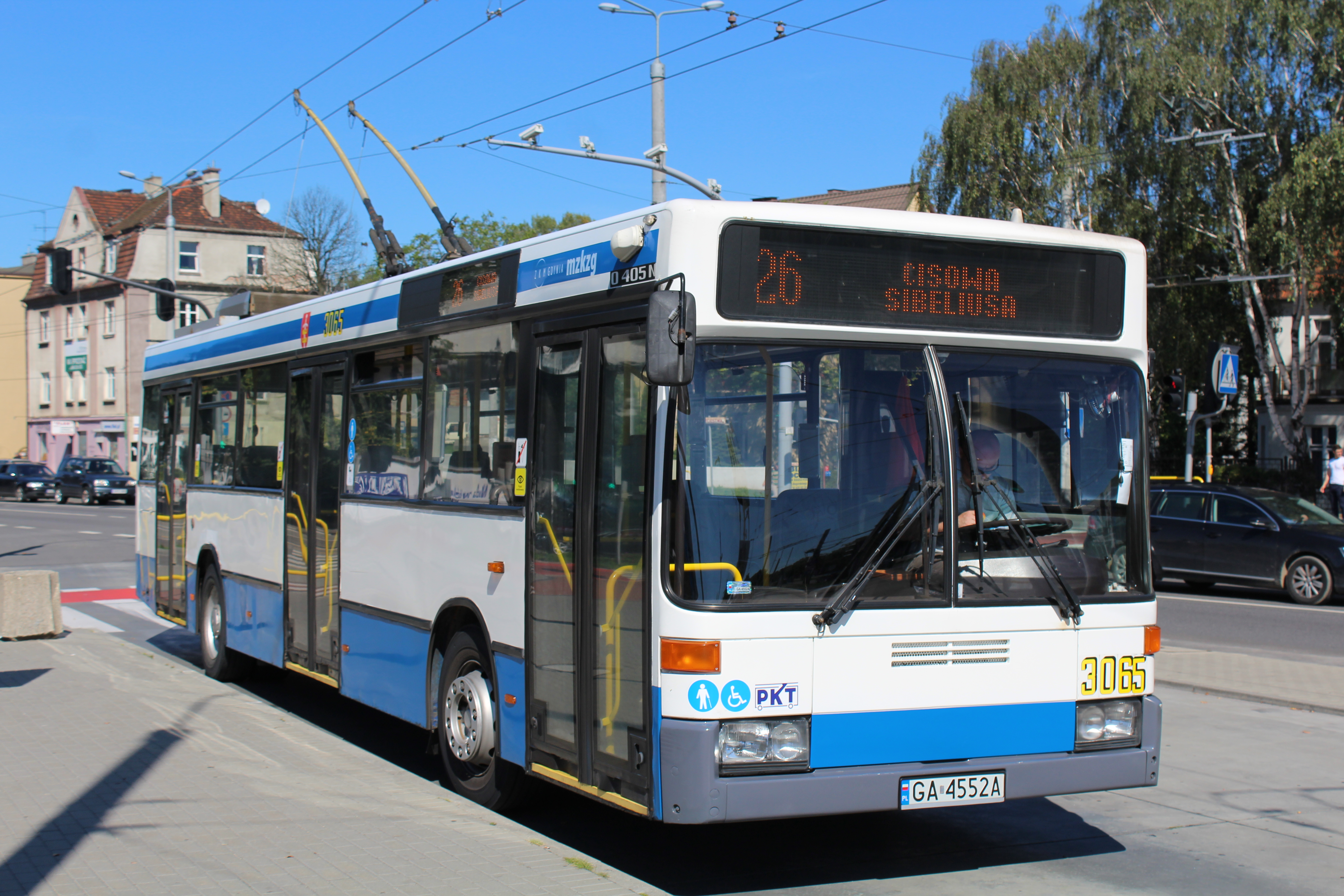
O405NE

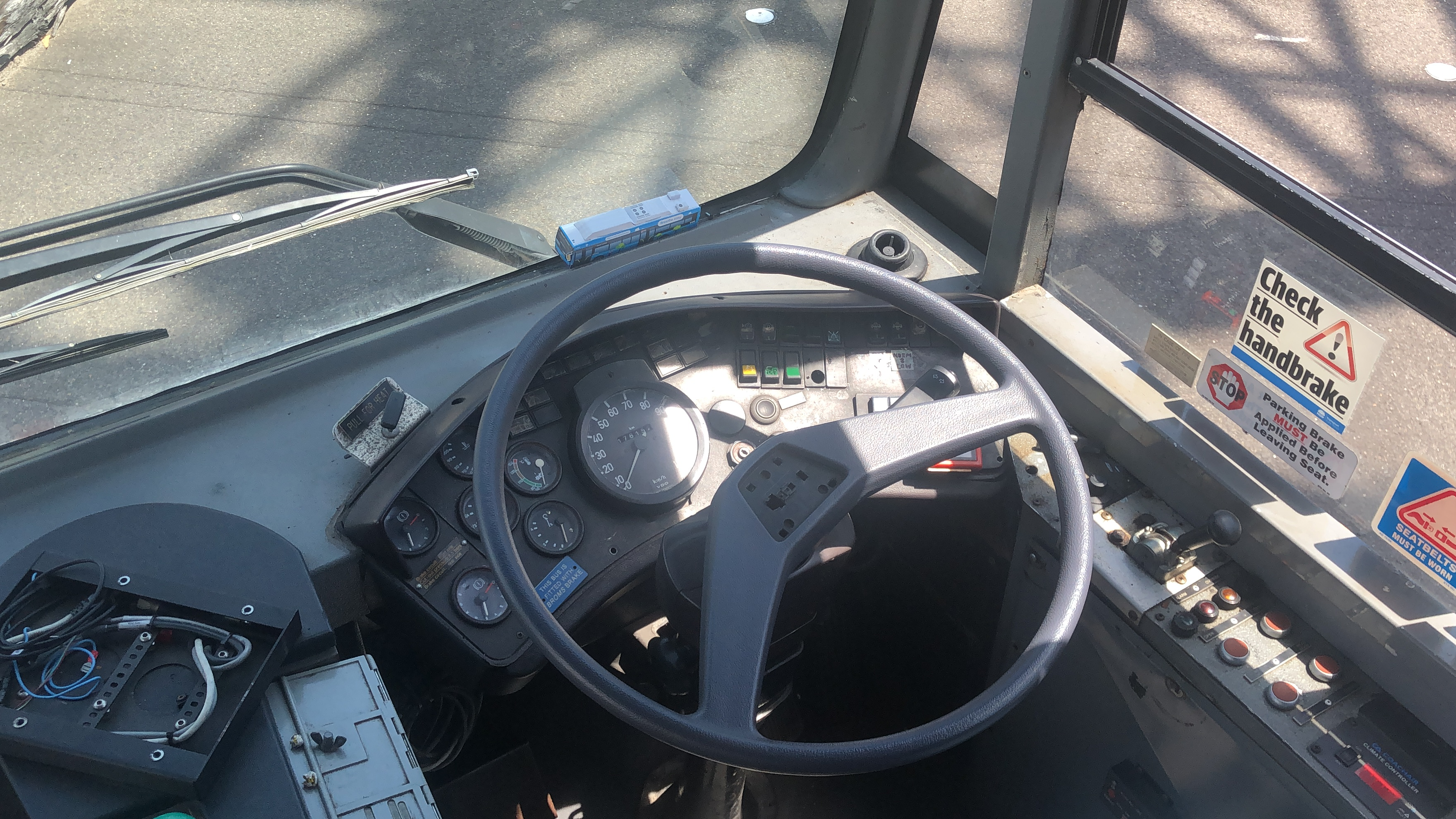
Australian O405N dashboard (same design as O405 and NH)

The low-floor version of the regular O405, known as the O405N (or O405GN for the 3-axle articulated version), was released in September 1989, later a further developed version was also built, it was known as the O405N²/O405N2 (or O405GN²/O405GN2 for the 3-axle articulated version). The O405(G)N do not have steps at the entrances and exits, but the seats are mounted on "platforms". The GN2 type addressed this problem. These buses are usually fitted with ZF transmissions, but some are fitted with Voith examples. It has a boxy roof dome (slightly arched) similar to the MAN NL202 and the MAN NL262 with a double-curvature windscreen with a separately mounted destination display just that it has a full low floor layout with seats mounted on platforms.

== Low-entry version: O405NH ==
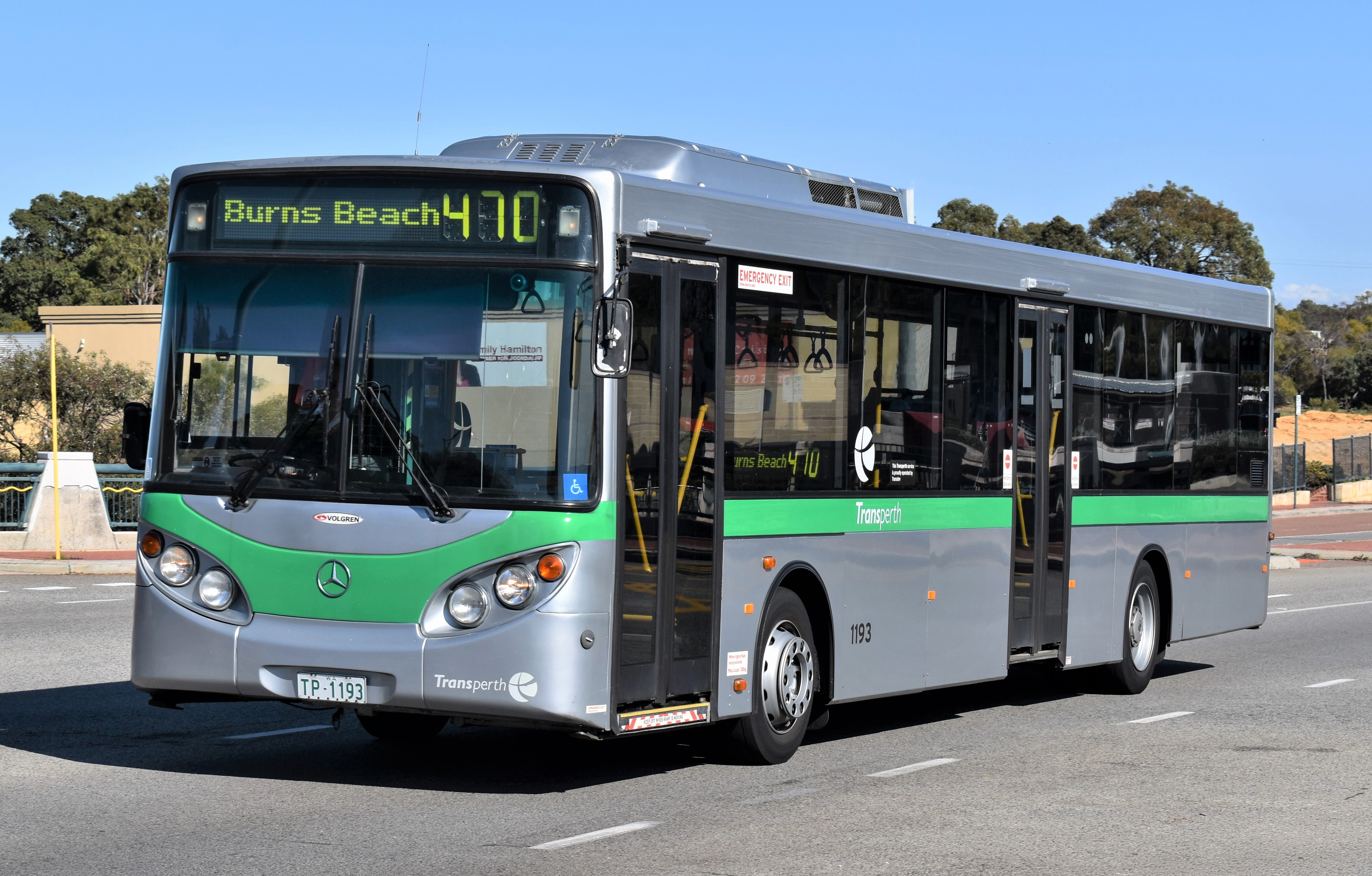
Transperth Volgren bodied O405NH

The low-entry version of the O405 was called the O405NH chassis which was produced by EvoBus for the Australian market. Much of its popularity with government and private operators alike can be attributed to the popularity of the Mercedes-Benz O405 MkII chassis that it replaced.

The chassis was derived from a combination of the rear modules of an O405 MkII chassis and the front modules of an O405N²/O405GN² chassis. Because of the difference in height between the front and rear modules of the chassis, there are one or more steps leading up from behind the centre door position to a standard O405 floorline. Because the chassis has a horizontally mounted engine, there's no room for a rear door. This low-entry concept has become very popular in Europe – many integral products using this concept have been released such as the Mercedes-Benz Citaro LE.

== Suburban version: O407 ==
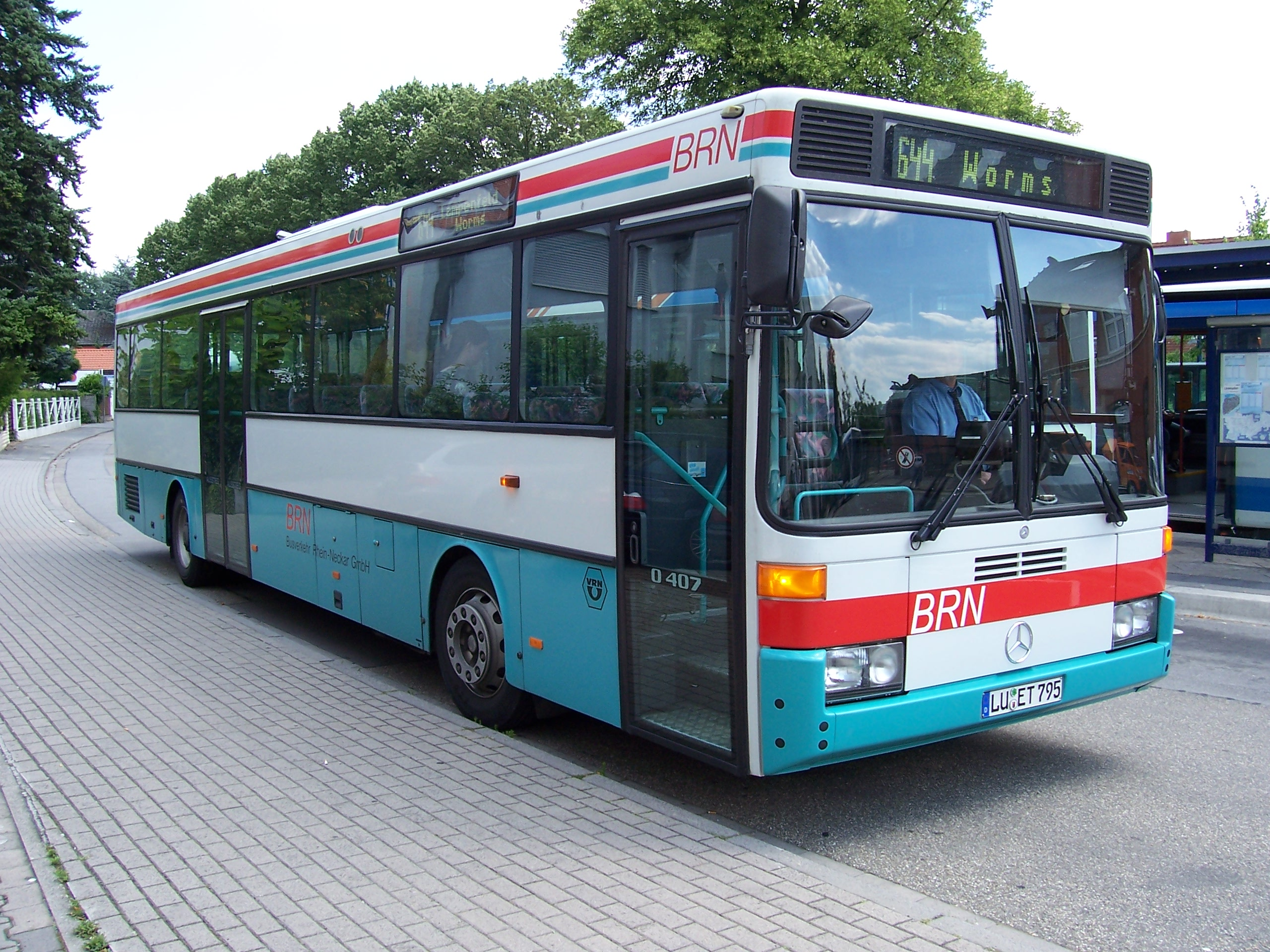
O407 integral

The suburban version was called O407 (or O407G/O405GÜ for the 3-axle articulated version), It had a single door at the front and a pair in the middle, with all of the seats facing towards the front of the bus. It featured a Mercedes-Benz OM447h naturally aspirated engine with output 177 kW (237 hp) and 6-speed manual Mercedes-Benz gearbox.

== Orders and known operations ==
=== Portugal ===
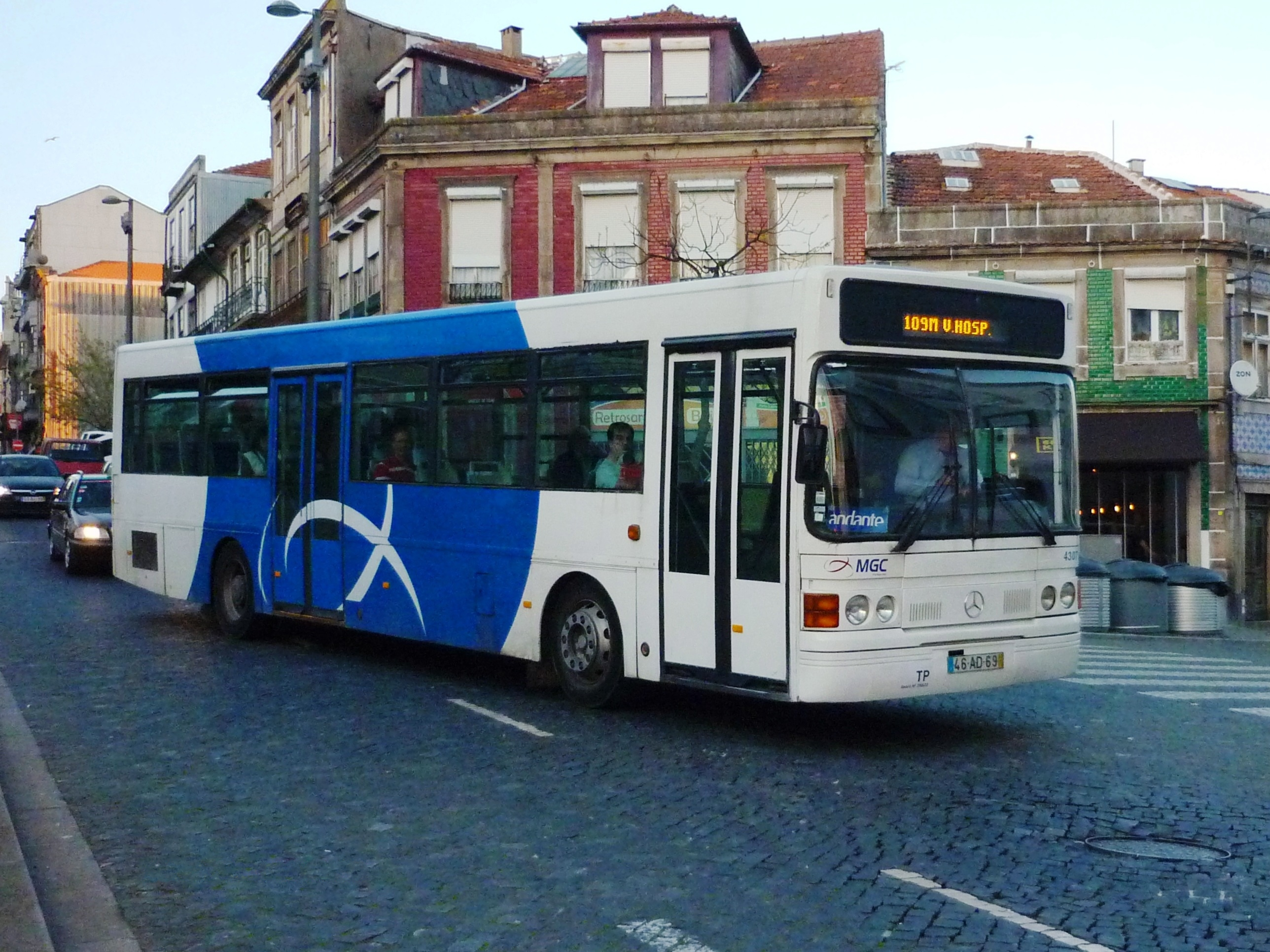
Castrosua O405N in Portugal

- Camo U1001S
- Camo Camus
- Irmãos Mota Atomic UR95 and UR2000
- Marcopolo Tricana bodies

In 1995, the first six O405 buses were delivered to Rodoviária de Lisboa (former Rodoviária Nacional) as the freights L-774 to L-779. More O405 buses were delivered between 1996 and 2003. The first 2 O405N were delivered in February 2003 as the freights L-533 and L-534, two months later as L-530, L-531, L-532 and L-535. The first O405N2 was delivered in July 2004 as the freight L-511. The first two O405G articulated buses were delivered in 2002, as more O405G buses were delivered in 2007 to replace the older Volvo B10MA buses. The first two UR95 O405 buses were delivered in 2004 which came from Vimeca Transportes as freights L-548 and L-549.

Many O405 buses were dropped and scrapped in 2013 and it have been replaced by the O405N2 Camo Camus buses, originally from CCFL Carris between 2013 and 2014 and the second-hand Citaros in 2015-16. The rest of O405 were entirely dropped in late 2022, as well as Camo Camus bodied and Citaros C1 in favor of new Conectos, Citaros K and Intouros being used in the new company called Carris Metropolitana (which started in 2023). Some O405 buses changed the RL colors (Example: The O405N2 freight L-540 was originally a yellow RL color, now it changed to blue RL in 2015).

=== Spain ===
- Unicar
- Hispano Carrocera
- Castrosua
- Burillo

=== United Kingdom ===
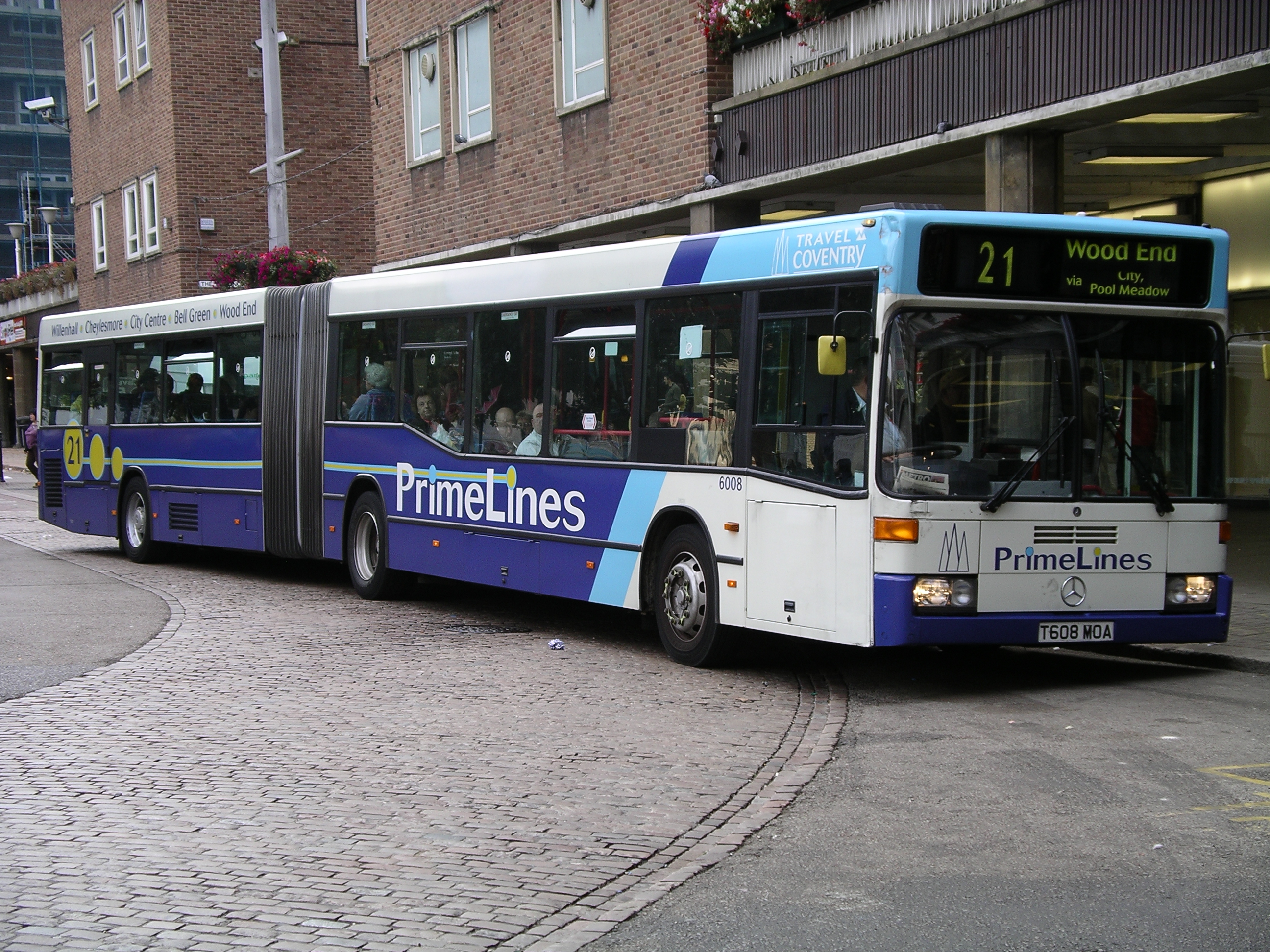
Travel Coventry O405GN

A total of 365 O405s were built for operators in the United Kingdom, with Travel West Midlands purchasing 204. A sole O405Gs was bodied by Alexander for Grampian Regional Transport.

A total of 204 O405Ns were built for operators in the United Kingdom, with Travel West Midlands purchasing 193. A total of 15 O405GNs were built for operators in the United Kingdom, with Travel West Midlands purchasing 11.

=== Hong Kong ===
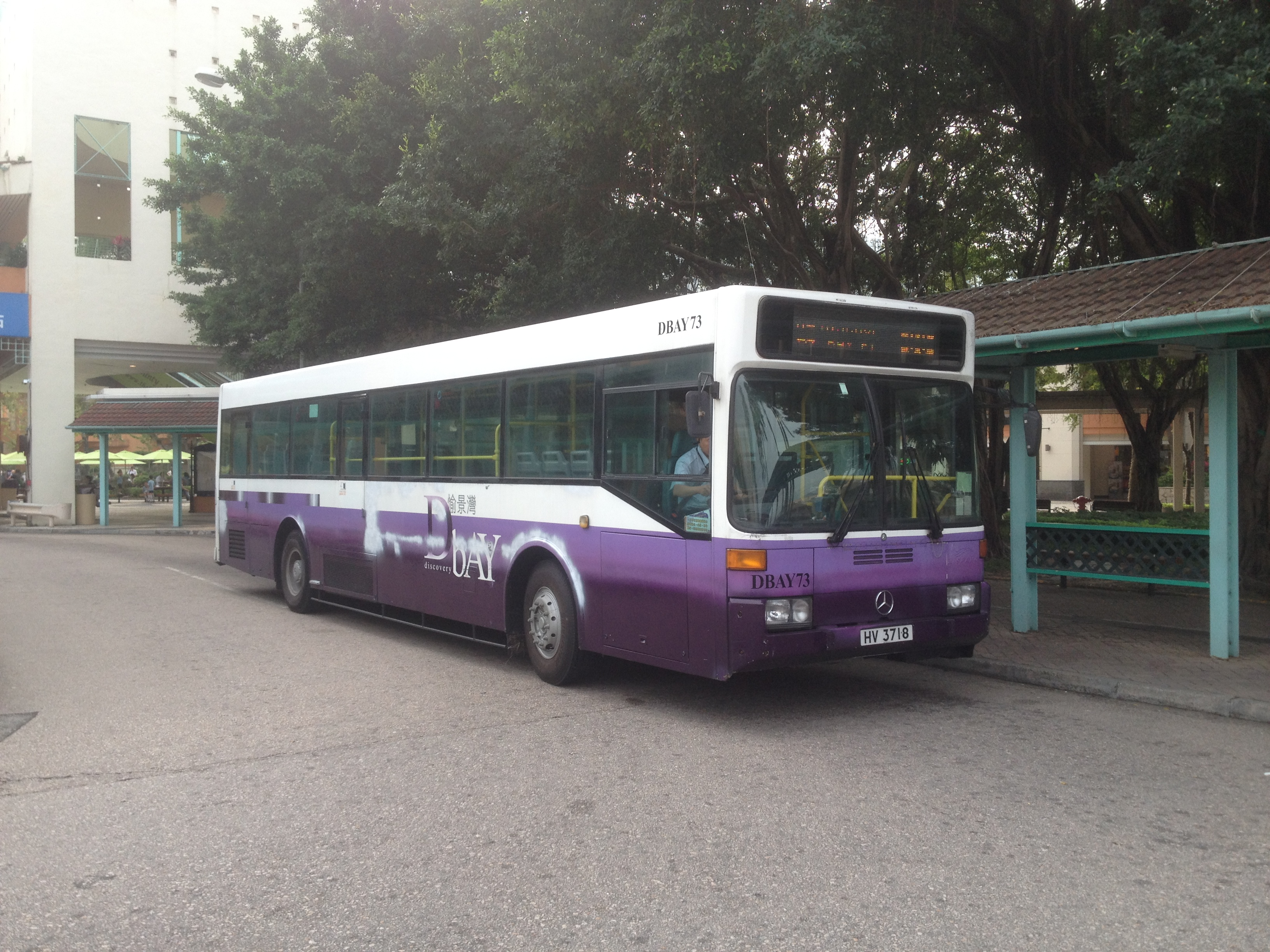
Discovery Bay Transit Services' Mercedes-Benz O405 in April 2015

Discovery Bay Transit Services of Hong Kong acquired four O405 single-decker buses between 1995 and 1998, two were fitted with locally built bodywork by Asia Auto Body Works and the other two had Hispano Carrocera bodywork.

=== Australia ===
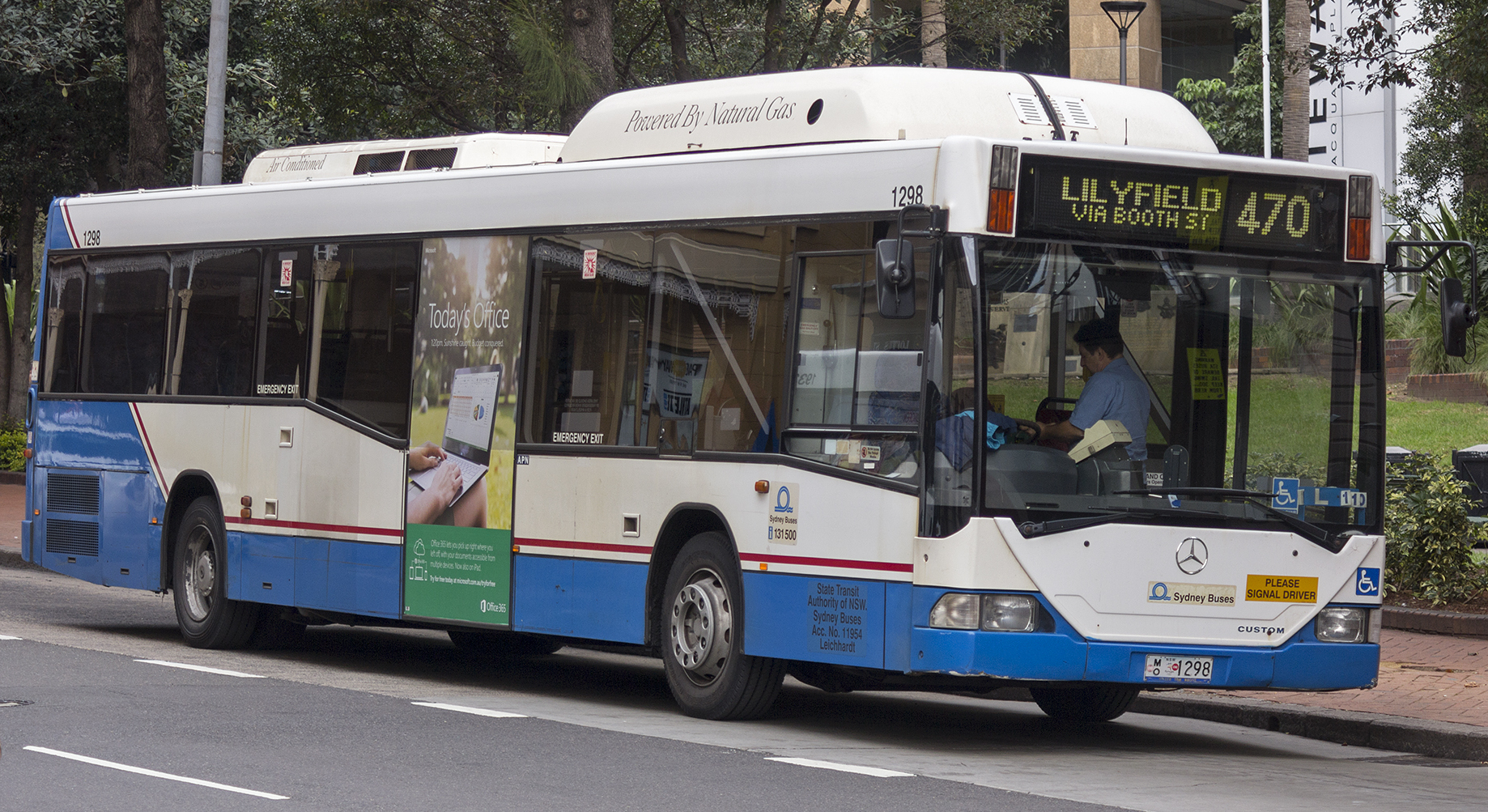
State Transit Authority Custom Coaches bodied O405NH

Sydney Buses took delivery of 247 Pressed Metal Corporation bodied O405s between 1987 and October 1990. The last were retired in early 2016. In January 1997 it received two Ansair bodied O405Ns. It also inherited four Custom Coaches bodied O405s when it purchased North & Western Bus Lines. Between October 1999 and December 2001 it received 300 Custom Coaches bodied CNG O405NHs with the O405NH discontinued after this order.

=== Russia ===
- GolAZ (Golitsynskii avtobusnyi zavod) produced model O405 (АКА-5225) and O405G (АКА-6226)

=== Thailand ===
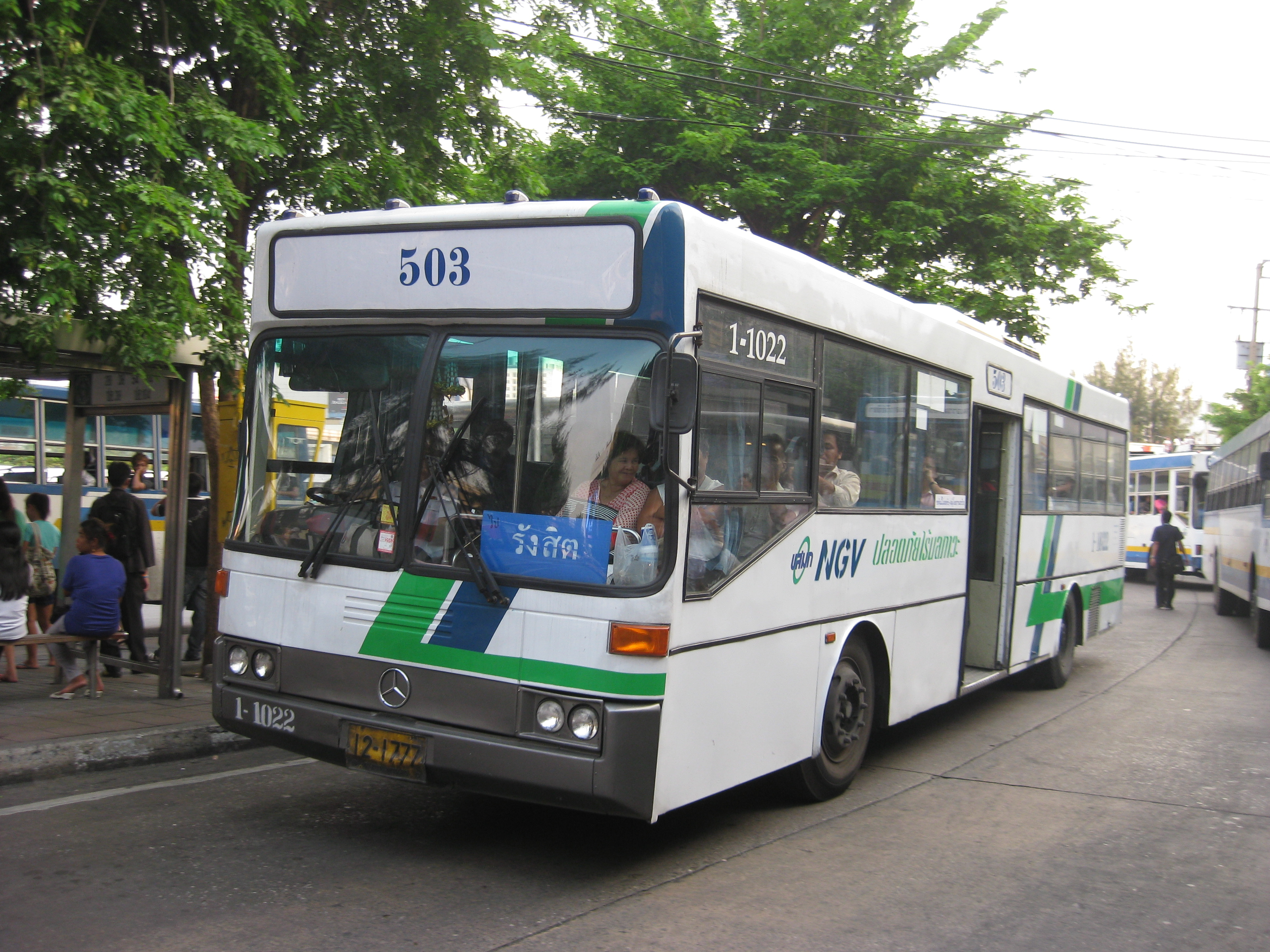
Mercedes-Benz O405CNG operated by BMTA

In 1993 BMTA bought about 38 Mercedes-Benz O405CNG buses. The O405CNG were withdrawn in 2011.

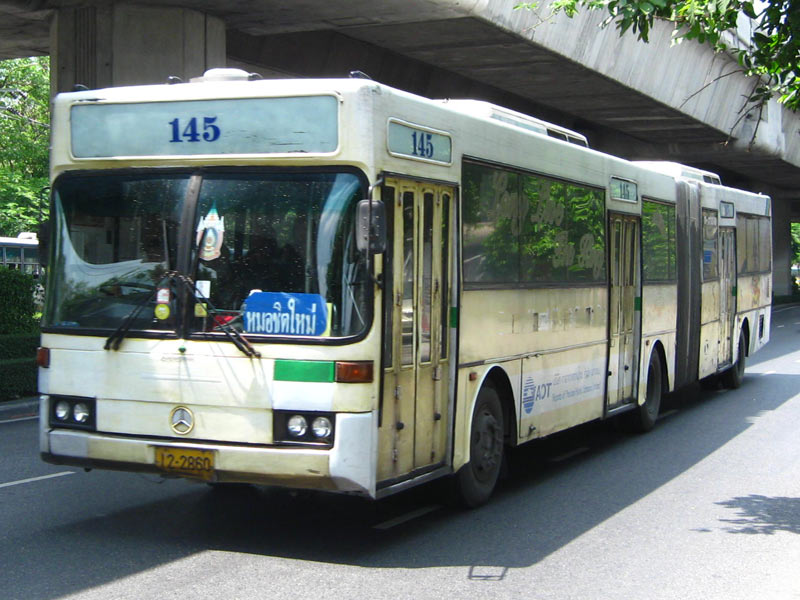
Mercedes-Benz O405G operated by BMTA

In 1995 BMTA bought about 52 Mercedes-Benz O405G. These were withdrawn in 2011.

=== Bulgaria ===
Eridantrans EOOD bought many buses for the 260-line to Gorna Banya. They experienced hard turbulence on the Tsar Boris III avenue, but remained unbroken.

In 2001 Sofia municipality bought 10 second hand single O405 buses from Germany. Those buses operated on various bus lines in the city and the villages around the city (such as 12, 16, 18, 21/22, 25, 26, 28, 53. 117, etc.). By 2017 all of them are withdrawn and most of them are scrapped. However, two buses are not scrapped yet and stay in Druzhba depot, but both are with huge amount of missing parts so their destiny is not clear.

=== Nigeria ===
Lagos based private company Lagbus (Red Buses) of LAMATA is known to have at least adopted 1 O407 from Germany to work regular services, making it the unique unit of its Yutong ZK6100NGA9, Marcopolo and Ashok Leyland dominated fleet.

== Replacement ==
Production of the O405 series ended in 2001 when the last articulated buses were delivered to Trans-Island Bus Services. The O405 and O405N were superseded by the O530 Citaro, and the O405NH was also superseded by the OC500LE.
