= Association of German Transport Companies =

- Association of German Transport Companies
- Verband Deutscher Verkehrsunternehmen e. V.
- Predecessor: Verband öffentlicher Verkehrsbetriebe (VÖV), Bundesverband Deutscher Eisenbahnen, Kraftverkehre und Seilbahnen (BDE), and the VÖV of the former East Germany
- Founded: 1991
- Headquarters: Cologne, Germany
- Members: 685 (2026)
- Key people: Ingo Wortmann (president); Oliver Wolff (chief executive and managing director, rail transport); Alexander Möller (managing director, public transport); Martin Schmitz (managing director, technology)
- Website: www.vdv.de

The Association of German Transport Companies (German: Verband Deutscher Verkehrsunternehmen e. V., VDV) is the German industry association for companies and organisations involved in public transport and rail freight transport. It represents the interests of its members towards politics, public authorities, industry and other institutions, promotes cooperation and the exchange of experience among its members, carries out public relations work for public transport, and develops technical, operational, legal and economic principles for the transport sector.

As of May 2026, the VDV has 685 member companies, comprising 615 ordinary and 70 extraordinary members. The VDV is a member of the International Association of Public Transport (UITP).

== Organisation and activities ==
The VDV organises its members in nine regional groups and five divisions. The five divisions are:

- passenger transport by buses (BUS);
- passenger transport by trams, light rail, metro systems or comparable transport systems (TRAM);
- passenger transport by railways (PVE);
- rail freight transport (SGV); and
- transport associations and public transport authorities (V/AT).

The association advises its member companies at regional and national level and provides a platform for the exchange of experience and expertise. It represents the interests of its member companies towards parliaments, governments, public authorities, industry and other institutions, promotes cooperation among its members, and conducts public relations activities for public transport. It also develops technical, operational, economic and legal principles and recommendations for the sector.

The VDV's statutory seat is in Cologne. Its main office is also located there. In addition, the association maintains the VDV capital office in Berlin and the VDV European office in Brussels.

The president of the VDV is Ingo Wortmann, who has held the office since 6 November 2018 and was elected to a third term in November 2024.

The association's chief executive is Oliver Wolff, who is also managing director responsible for rail transport. Alexander Möller is managing director for public transport and Martin Schmitz is managing director for technology.

For electronic ticketing based on the VDV core application (VDV-Kernapplikation, VDV-KA), the VDV established a subsidiary that is now known as VDV eTicket Service GmbH & Co. KG. Transport companies and transport associations are among its limited partners. Its predecessor, VDV-Kernapplikations GmbH & Co. KG, was founded in 2004 to develop a common electronic-ticketing standard for public transport and was renamed VDV eTicket Service in 2014. The company is responsible for the VDV-Kernapplikation and related central services for interoperable electronic fare management.

== History ==
=== Predecessor organisations ===
The history of the association's predecessor organisations dates back to the Association of Prussian Railways (Verband der Preußischen Eisenbahnen), founded in 1846, and the Association of German Tramway and Light Railway Administrations (Verein Deutscher Straßen- und Kleinbahnverwaltungen), founded in 1895. Their purpose was to promote cooperation and the exchange of experience between member companies and to represent their interests towards political authorities, industry and other modes of transport.

The association's headquarters were in Berlin until 1945. In 1928, the organisation was renamed the Association of German Transport Administrations (Verband Deutscher Verkehrsverwaltungen). From 1934, under Nazi Germany, it was incorporated into the transport organisations controlled by the Reich Ministry of Transport as part of the process of Gleichschaltung, largely depriving it of its independent influence.

=== After the Second World War ===
Following the collapse of Nazi Germany and the Allied occupation of Germany, the Association of Tramways and Other Public Passenger Transport Companies in the British Occupation Zone (Verein der Straßenbahnen und sonstigen öffentlichen Personenverkehrsunternehmen in der britischen Besatzungszone) was founded on 8 November 1946. Its members operated trams, trolleybuses and buses, and its headquarters were in Essen.

A corresponding Association of Tramways in the American Occupation Zone was founded in the American occupation zone in 1946. At the end of 1947, the two organisations combined their activities in the Working Group of Associations of Public Transport Companies (Arbeitsgemeinschaft der Vereinigungen öffentlicher Verkehrsbetriebe, AVV). Specialist committees resumed their work within the AVV.

The AVV succeeded in having public transport companies placed in priority category 1 (Dringlichkeitsstufe 1), improving their access to urgently needed materials during the early post-war reconstruction period. A reconstruction plan initiated by the AVV calculated that 1.25 million marks would be required to restore transport infrastructure operated by the public transport companies to its 1938 level.

The establishment of the Federal Republic of Germany in the three western occupation zones on 23 May 1949 created a more stable institutional framework. On 26 October 1949, the Association of Public Transport Companies (Verband öffentlicher Verkehrsbetriebe, VÖV) was established. Its office initially remained in Essen and moved to Cologne in 1959, where it also remained when the present VDV was created in 1991.

During German reunification, the West German VÖV, the Federal Association of German Railways, Motor Transport and Cableways (Bundesverband Deutscher Eisenbahnen, Kraftverkehre und Seilbahnen, BDE), and the VÖV of the former German Democratic Republic agreed to merge. The present-day VDV was formed at the beginning of 1991.

=== Standardisation of tram vehicles ===
Following the Second World War, there was an urgent need to replace damaged and destroyed vehicles used for urban passenger transport. Numerous surviving chassis of war-damaged tramcars were therefore fitted with standardised new bodies by Düsseldorfer Waggonfabrik (DUEWAG). Between 1948 and 1950, 355 motor cars and 248 trailers of the so-called Aufbauwagen type were produced.

They were followed by completely new two- and three-axle tramcars with newly manufactured chassis. The Verbandswagen, designed according to plans developed by the tramcar working group of the German rolling-stock industry association and later associated with the VÖV, was produced by several manufacturers between 1951 and 1958. A total of 206 motor cars and 326 trailers were built.

=== Standardisation of buses ===
From the 1960s onwards, the VÖV promoted the standardisation of urban buses. This resulted in specifications for the first-generation Standard-Linienbus, which was manufactured in series by several bus manufacturers from 1968 until the mid-1980s.

In the early 1980s, specifications followed for the second-generation Standard-Linienbus II. The VÖV standard-bus programmes had a major influence on the design of German urban buses during this period.

=== Electronic ticketing ===
A more recent field of standardisation is electronic ticketing. The VDV-Kernapplikation was developed as an industry standard for interoperable electronic fare management in German public transport. It specifies data and security management and interfaces required for compatible e-ticket systems.

VDV eTicket Service, which emerged from the company originally established to develop the VDV-Kernapplikation, maintains and develops the standard and operates central services used by participating transport companies and transport associations.

== Policy positions ==
In June 2019, the VDV published a statement entitled Das Klimakabinett muss jetzt handeln ("The Climate Cabinet must act now"). The association called for a substantial expansion of passenger and freight transport capacity on railways and buses, the introduction of climate funds for public transport, faster planning and construction procedures, and the use of climate policy as an opportunity for German industrial policy.

The VDV's demands were also publicised in full-page advertisements in national newspapers.

== See also ==
- Public transport in Germany
- VöV-Standard-Bus
