= MAN Auto-Uzbekistan =

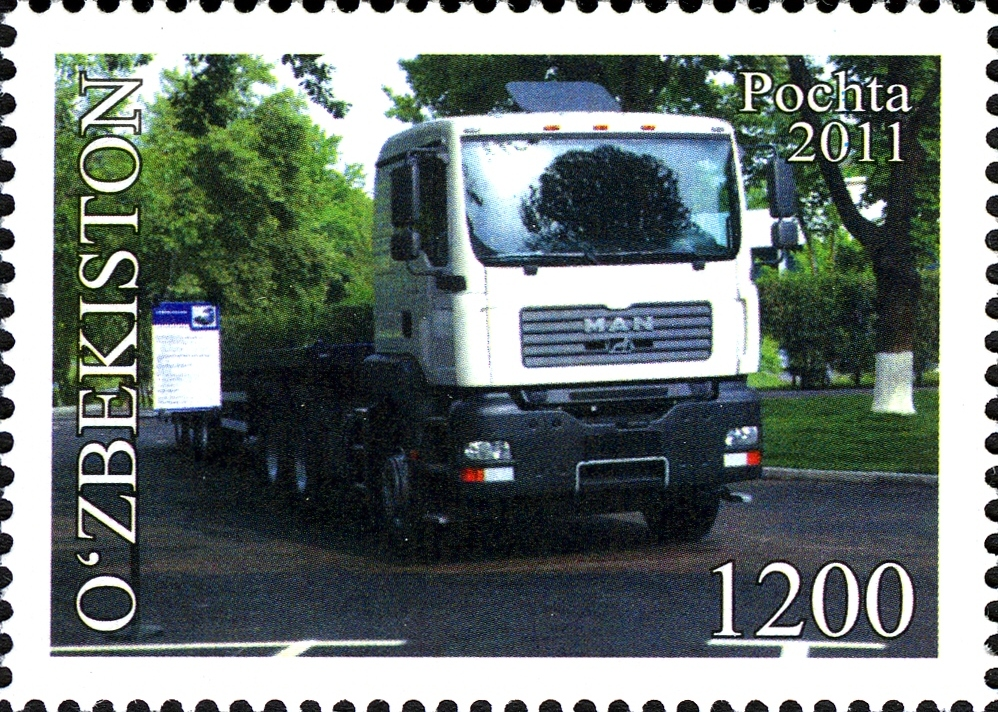
Stamp of Uzbekistan, 2011

The MAN AUTO-Uzbekistan Company is a joint venture between the German MAN Nutzfahrzeuge AG and the Uzbek OJSC UzAvtosanoat. The joint venture was founded in August 2009. Subsequently, the employees at the plant were trained by the MAN staff to ensure a proper assembly of the vehicles and to increase the theoretical knowledge of the workforce. The consolidation of the contractual joint venture took place on 4 September 2009 at the Oqsaroy Residence in Tashkent. Agents of the parties were on the Uzbek side the President Islam Abdugʻaniyevich Karimov and the chairman of the UzAvtosanoat Mr. Ulugbek Rozukulov. The German side was represented only by the CEO Håkan Samuelsson.

The assembly of the vehicles began on the day when the joint venture contract was signed. SamAuto provides their assembly plant in Samarkand. One of the currently assembled models is the MAN TGA which is delivered as a CKD kit from Germany. Another model is the identical truck called MAN CLA which is made by the Indian MAN Force Trucks Pvt. Ltd. This units are also delivered as a CKD kit. According to plans of MAN they want to build 500 up to 1000 units annual. For the sales of the vehicles, UzAvtosanoat had established a separate dealer network. The production capacity is expected to rise later to more than 2000 units. MAN have plans to introducing the Indian CLA model version in a modified version especially for the Central Asian market called the MAN CLE. So the target markets for the Uzbek manufactured models is the Uzbek domestic market for itself and all markets of the CIS states. Some used vehicles are exported to Uzbekistan for the strategic market support as a complete vehicle by the Neuhaus GmbH located in Selm. In addition to the TGA and the CLA series there are also the TGA TGM series and the obsolete models MAN F2000, MAN M2000 and MAN F8 available.

UzAvtosanoat is the only truck manufacturer of Central Asia and plans to become a monopolistic company of the commercial vehicle sector. After the collapse of their former SamKochAvto joint venture, MAN is a promising partner for the company. Håkan Samuelsson, the German contract agent of MAN, was involved into the MAN-bribes scandal which became known in the late 2009. There have been suggestions that the UzAvtosanoat entangled in it, or could be affected.

In the first phase, the manufacturing should be adjusted to the various economic sectors such as the oil, gas and mining industry by using the local norms of the different targeted markets. Despite the global economic crisis it is seen that these sectors will achieves a dynamic growth. Also the expansion of the infrastructure will increase the demand for automobiles and other vehicles.

== production figures ==
- 2009: 100 units (TGA)
- 2010: 480 units (TGA and CLA)
- 2011: 658 units (CLA and TGS)
- 2012: 1016 units (CLA and TGS)
- 2013: 1300 units (CLA and TGS, planned)
- 2014: 1400 units

== Model overview ==
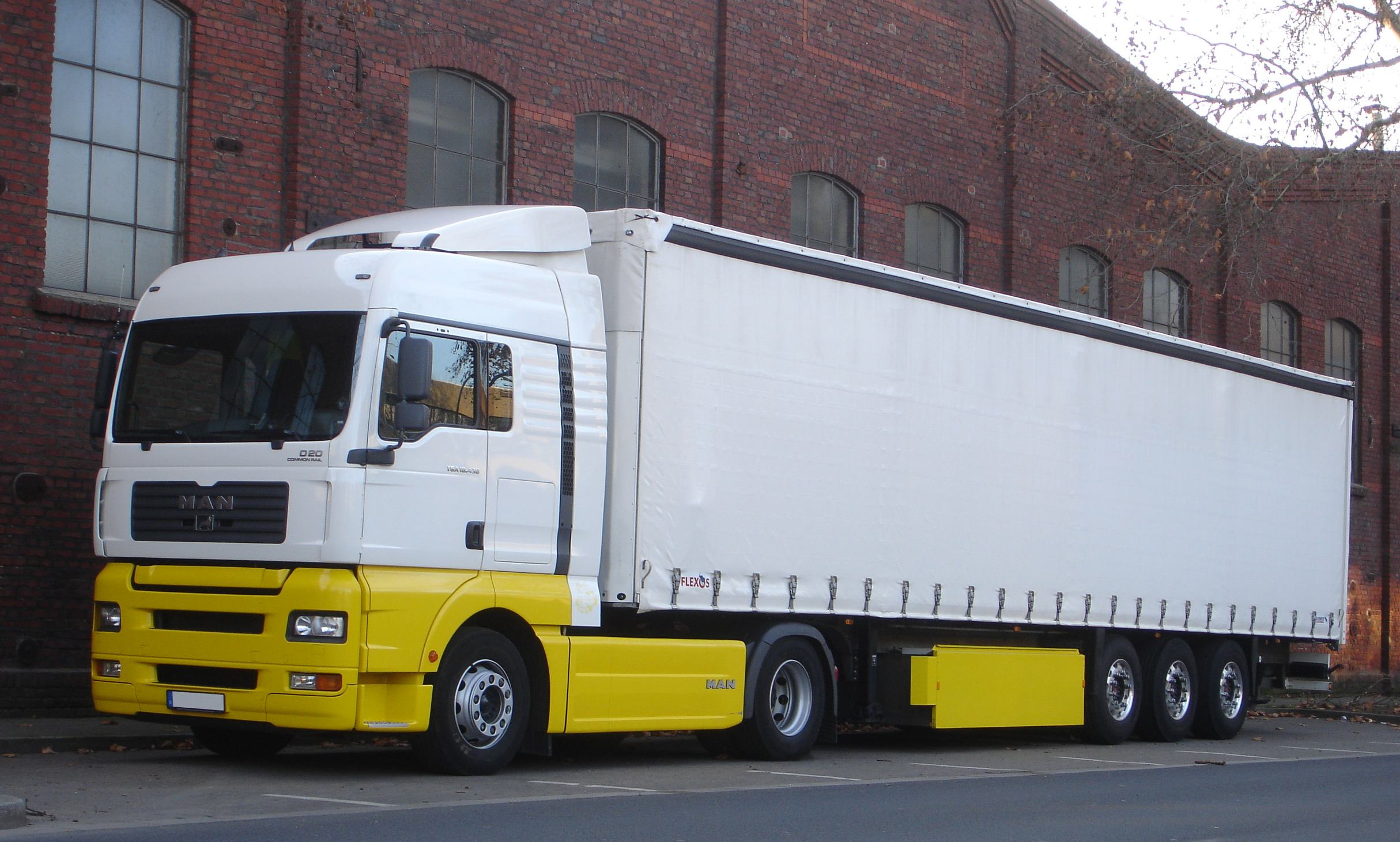
MAN TGA Series
CKD assembly
since 2009

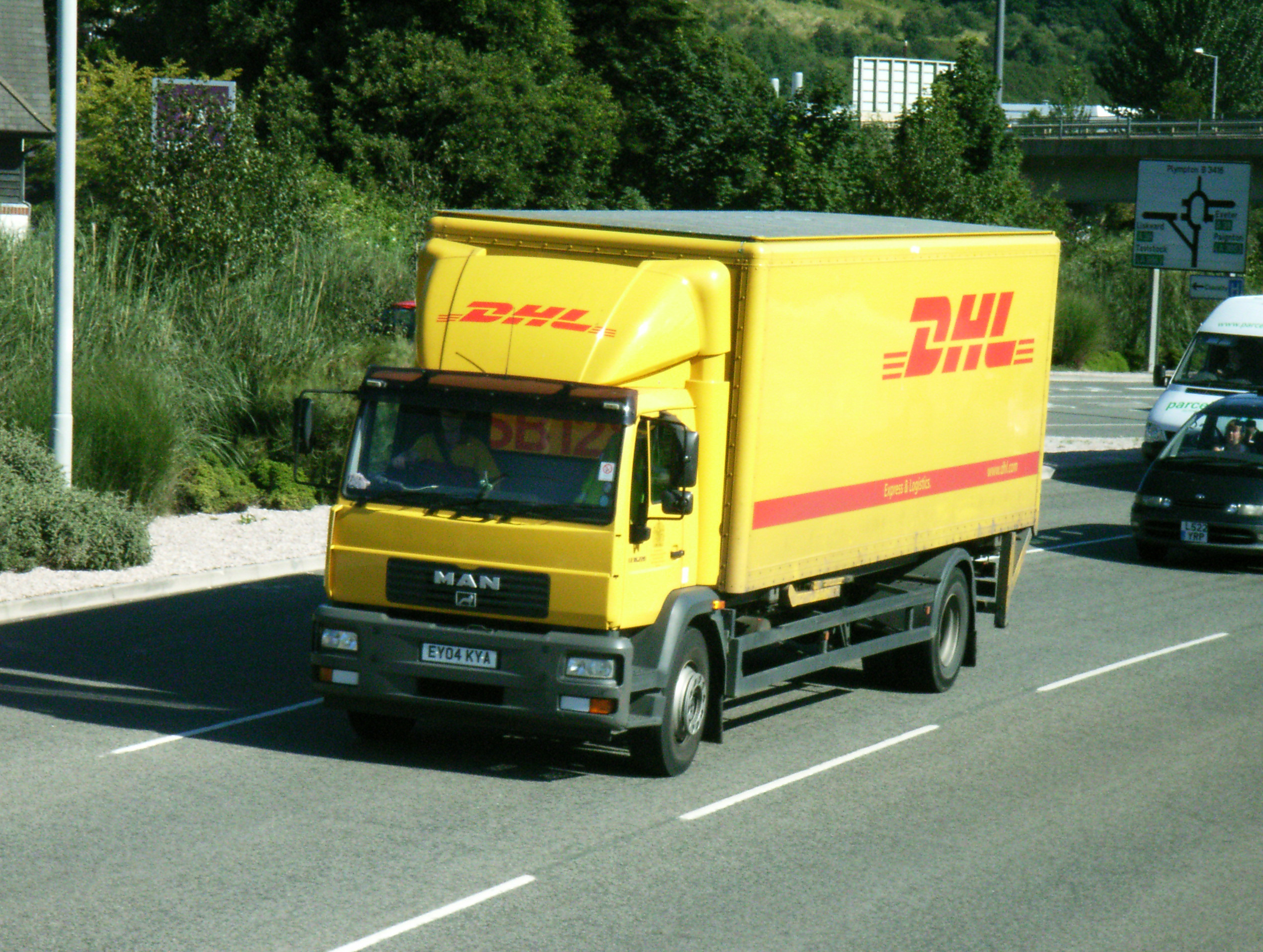
MAN CLA Series
CKD assembly
since 2010

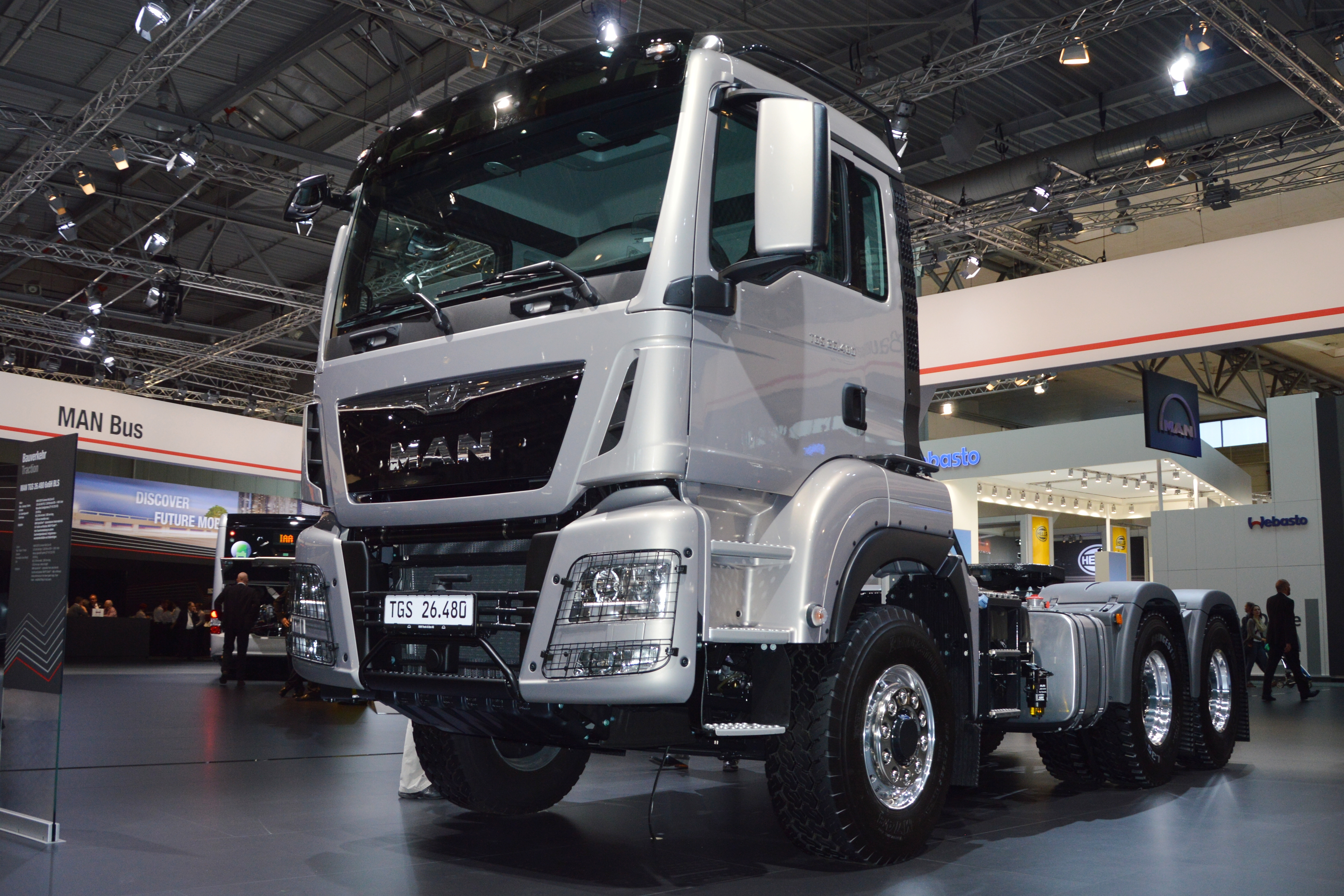
MAN TGS 26.480

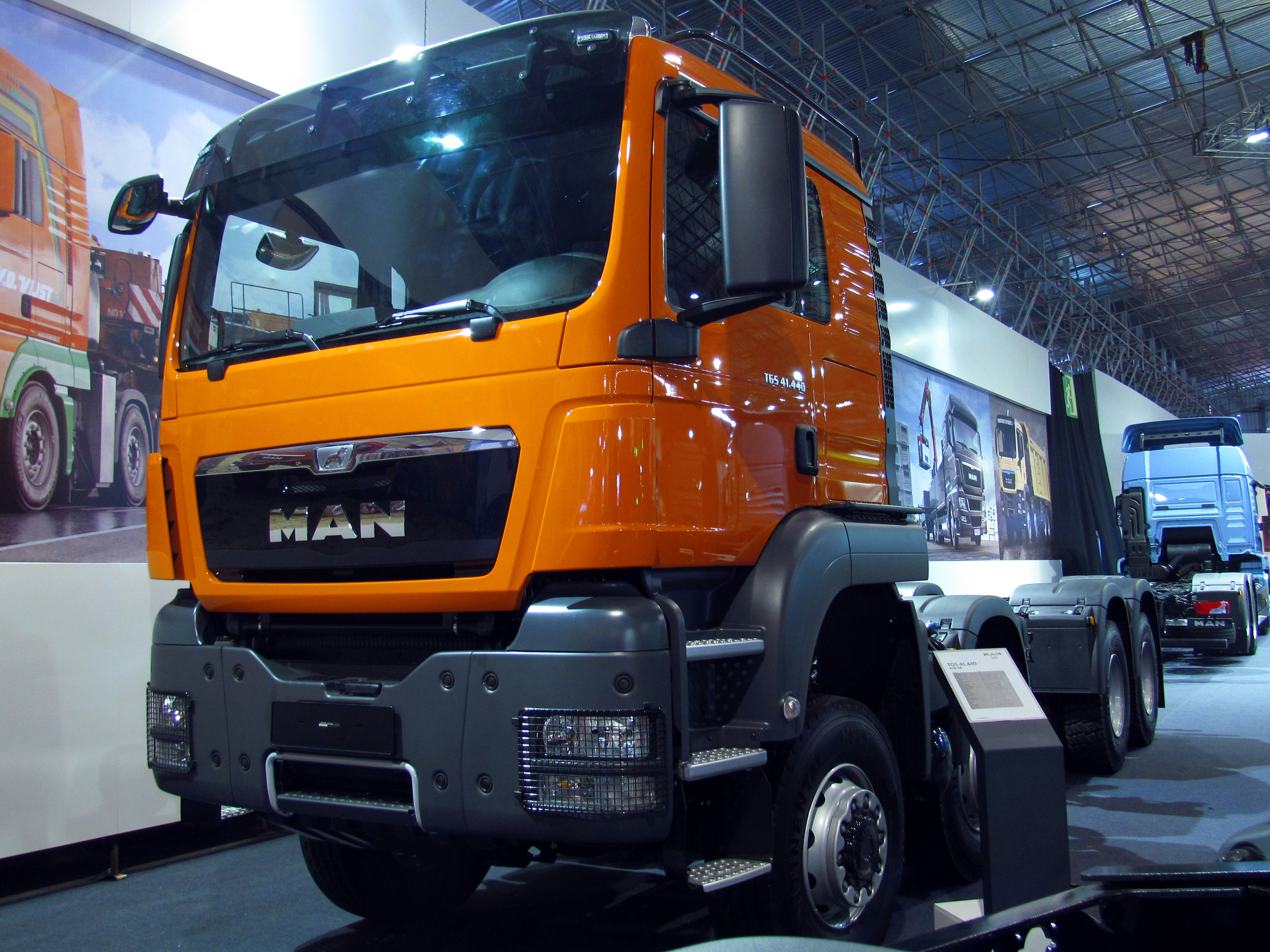
MAN TGS 41.440
