= MAN NG272 =

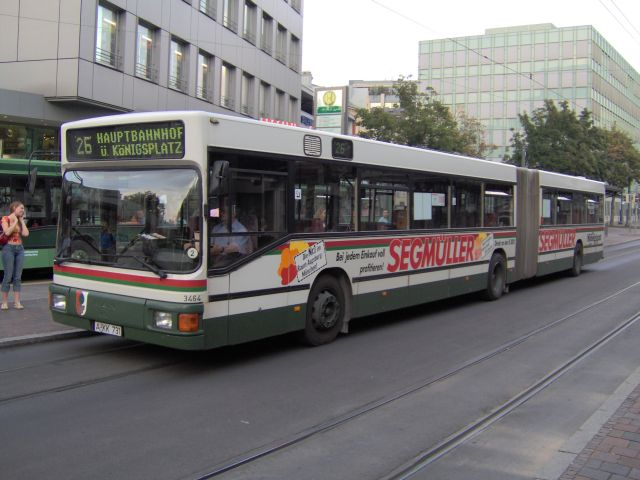

Overview
- Manufacturer: MAN Nutzfahrzeuge AG
- Production: 1990-1992
- Assembly: Germany

Body and chassis
- Class: Commercial vehicle
- Body style: Low floor articulated bus
- Doors: 2 to 4 doors
- Floor type: Low floor
- Related: Mercedes-Benz O405G/ GN

Powertrain
- Engine: MAN D 5865 LUH
- Transmission: Voith DIWA 864.4 / ZF 5HP Automatic

Dimensions
- Wheelbase: 3 axles, 5,875 mm / 6,265 mm
- Length: 17,940 mm
- Width: 2,500 mm
- Height: 2,872 mm
- Curb weight: 28,000 kg

Chronology
- Predecessor: MAN SG242
- Successor: MAN NG272(2)

The MAN NG272 was a low floor articulated single-decker bus built by MAN Nutzfahrzeuge from 1990 until 1992. It was an articulated development from the MAN NL202. Especially sold in Europe, in particular in Germany, it was replaced by the MAN NG272(2) (A11) in 1992.

== MAN NG272(2) ==
MAN NG272(2) (A11)
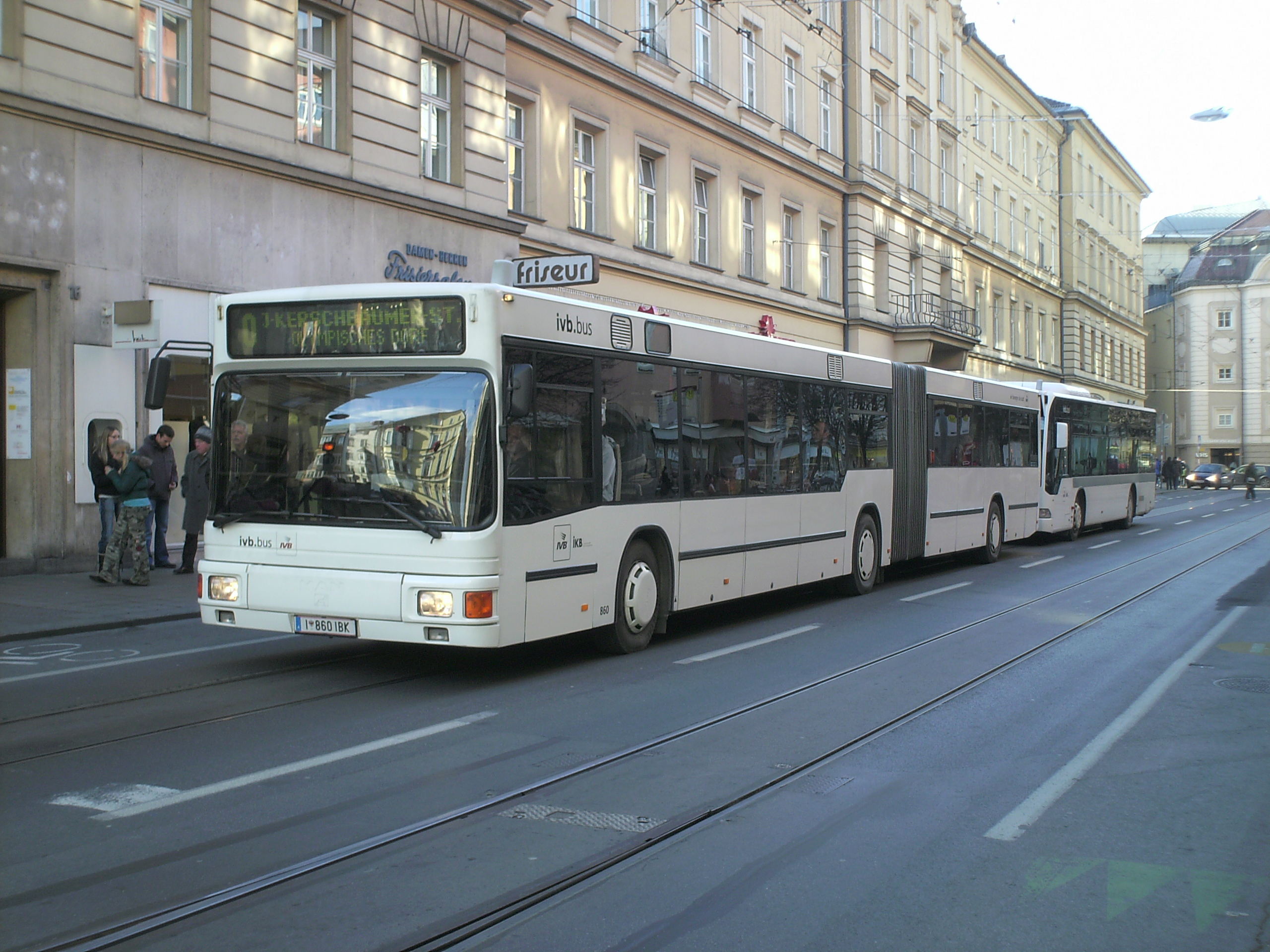

Overview
- Manufacturer: MAN Nutzfahrzeuge AG
- Production: 1992–2000
- Assembly: Germany

Body and chassis
- Class: Integral bus
- Body style: Single-decker articulated bus
- Doors: 2 doors, 3 doors and 4 doors
- Floor type: Low floor
- Related: Mercedes-Benz O405G/ GN

Powertrain
- Engine: MAN D 5865 LUH
- Transmission: Voith DIWA 864.4 / ZF 5HP Automatic

Dimensions
- Wheelbase: 3 Axles, 5,875 mm / 6,265 mm
- Length: 17,940 mm
- Width: 2,500 mm
- Height: 2,872 mm
- Curb weight: 15,200 kg

Chronology
- Predecessor: MAN NG272
- Successor: MAN NGxx3 (A23)

The MAN NG272(2) was a single-decker tri-axle articulated bus built by MAN Nutzfahrzeuge from 1992 until 2000. It is the articulated successor to the MAN NG272, and a development of the rigid bodied MAN NL262. The new (2) variant changed the original pillar seat supports which allowed the windows in the front section to be lowered, but otherwise remained visually very similar to the NG272. Especially sold in Europe, in particular in Germany, it was replaced by the MAN A23 in 1998.

Most NG272(2)s were fitted with MAN D 5865 LUH engines in the rear, coupled to drive the rear axle via either a Voith DIWA 864.4 or a ZF 5HP fully automatic transmission. However, after 1995, new models were fitted with Euro-2 spec engines and became NG262 and NG312 models. Its use of a fully low floor articulated configuration, being available with 3 or 4 doors and having a capacity of 51 seated and 60 standing that totals up to 111 passengers in standard configuration made them a good choice for inner-city bus operators.

=== Berliner Verkehrsbetriebe ===
In 1992, Berliner Verkehrsbetriebe (BVG) ordered a batch of BVG specification NG272(2) buses, which were the GN92 series. This were fitted with AEG Krüger full matrix displays, kneeling along the whole vehicle and a wheel chair lift. These also accompanied their EN92 series buses, which were of the MAN NL202(2) type.

=== Current Operation ===
The majority of NG272(2), NG262 and NG312 models, like their earlier NG272 cousins, have been retired from service in most transport companies, remaining operational mainly in private ownership or abroad.

== History ==
MAN Nutzfahrzeuge presented the NG272 in 1990 as a development in articulated buses from the previous model, the MAN SG242, a year later than the rigid body NL202. Both were constructed to the VöV-Standard-Bus standards. Production continued until 1992, when the model was superseded by the NG272(2) (A11), based also from the NL202(2). The new model changed the original pillar seat supports which allowed the windows in the front section to be lowered, but otherwise remained visually very similar.

Most NG272s were fitted with MAN D 2865 LUH engines in the rear, coupled to drive the rear axle via either a Voith DIWA 864.4 or a ZF 5HP fully automatic transmission. Its use of a low floor articulated configuration, being available with 3 or 4 doors and having a capacity of 51 seated and 111 standing in standard configuration made them a good choice for inner-city bus operators.

The majority of NG272's have been retired from service in most transport companies, remaining operational mainly in private ownership or abroad.

Production of NG272(2) continued until 1999, when the model had been superseded by the MAN NGxx3 (A23).

== In popular culture ==
MR Software have released OMSI 2 The Bus Simulator which features the MAN NG272

== See also ==
- MAN NL202
- MAN NL262
- Mercedes-Benz O405G/GN
