= MAN Truck & Bus =

German manufacturer of commercial vehicles

MAN Truck & Bus SE
- Formerly: MAN Nutzfahrzeuge AG; MAN Truck & Bus AG
- Type: Subsidiary
- Industry: Commercial vehicles Engines
- Founded: 1893; 133 years ago
- Headquarters: Munich, Bavaria, Germany
- Key people: Alexander Vlaskamp (CEO)
- Products: Trucks and buses; Diesel- and natural-gas engines
- Revenue: 10,900,000,000 euro (2021)
- Number of employees: 11,230 (1909) 13,916 (1910) 16,180 (1911) 15,321 (1912) 8,913 (1913) call-up to the army 5.745 11,719 (1914) 15,285 (1915) 23,197 (1916) 23,685 (1917) 17,835 (1918)
- Parent: Traton
- Divisions: MAN; Neoplan
- Website: mantruckandbus.com

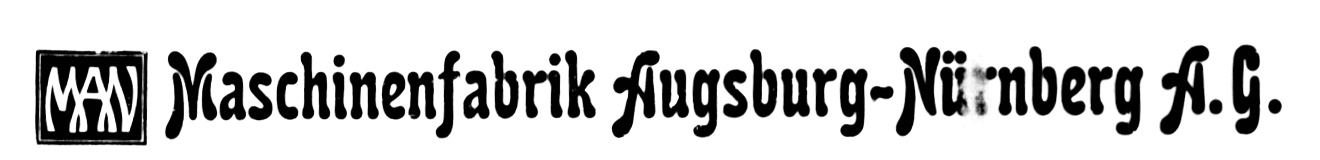
MAN Logo (7 Dec 1908-1924)

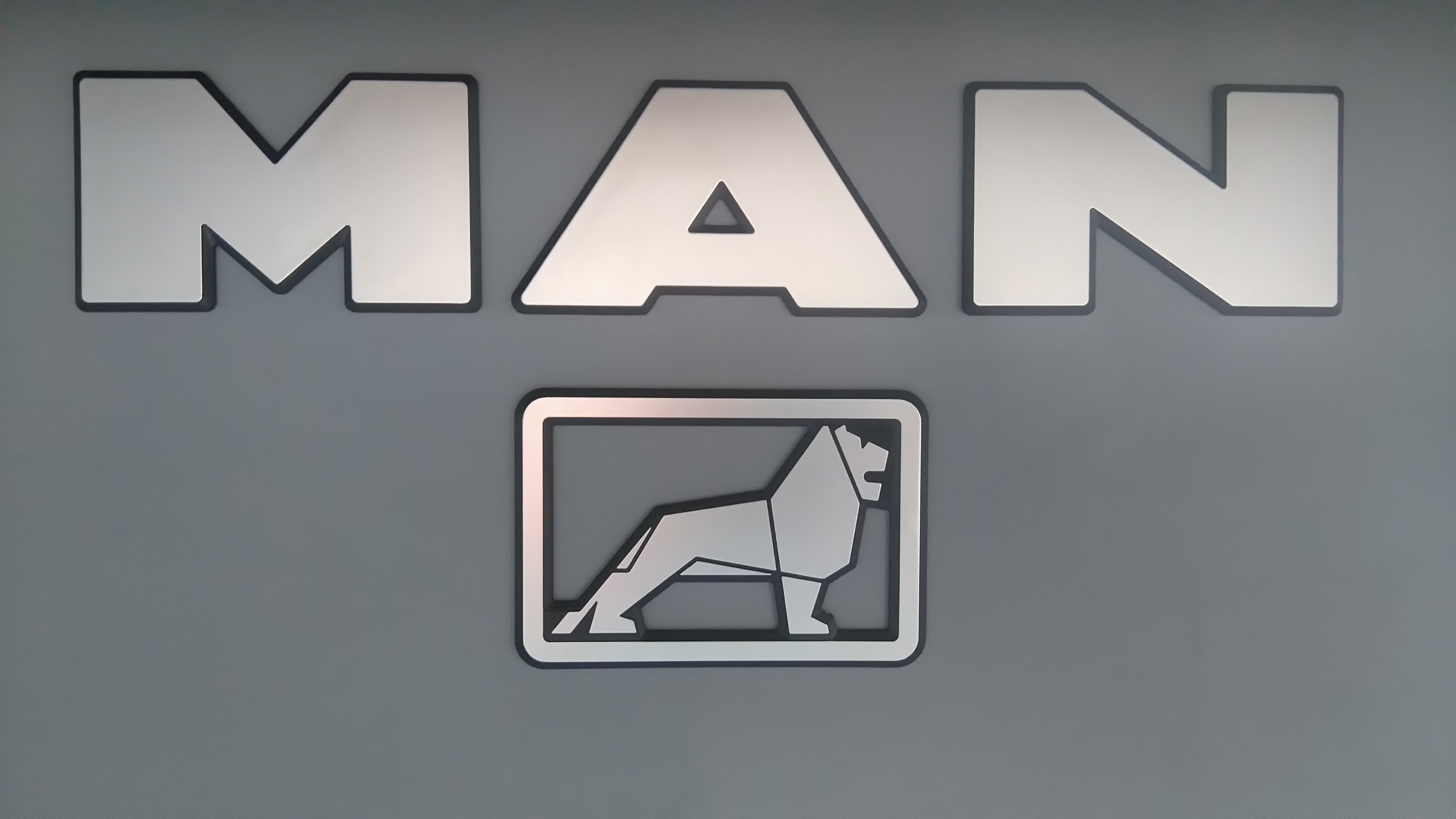
Logo variant

MAN Truck & Bus SE (formerly MAN Nutzfahrzeuge AG, German: [em.aː.en ˈnʊtsˌfaːɐ̯tsɔʏɡə ʔaːˈɡeː]) is a German automotive manufacturer and a subsidiary of Traton, one of the leading international providers of commercial vehicles. Headquartered in Munich, Germany, MAN Truck & Bus produces vans in the range from 3.0 to 5.5 t gvw, trucks in the range from 7.49 to 44 t gvw, heavy goods vehicles up to 250 t road train gvw, bus-chassis, coaches, interurban coaches, and city buses. MAN Truck & Bus also produces diesel and natural-gas engines. The MAN acronym originally stood for "Maschinenfabrik Augsburg-Nürnberg AG" (German: [maˈʃiːnənfaˌbʁiːk ˈʔaʊksbʊʁk ˈnʏʁnbɛʁk; -faˌbʁɪk-]), formerly MAN AG.

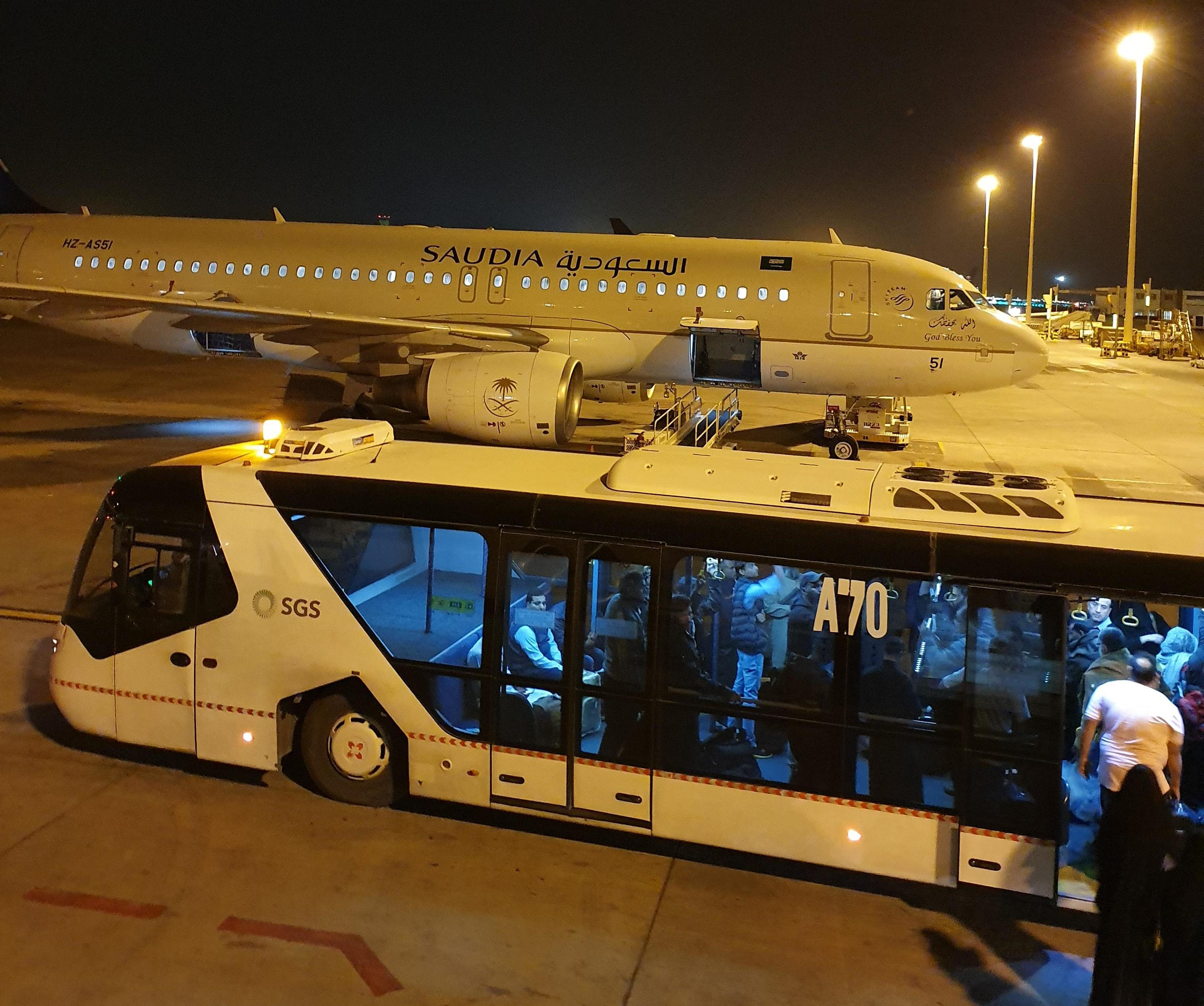
Neoplan Airport bus. Neoplan is owned by MAN.

Trucks and buses of the product brand MAN and buses of the product brand Neoplan (premium coaches) belong to the MAN Truck & Bus Group.

On 1 January 2011, MAN Nutzfahrzeuge (literally: "commercial vehicles") was renamed as MAN Truck & Bus to better reflect the company's products on the international market.

== History ==
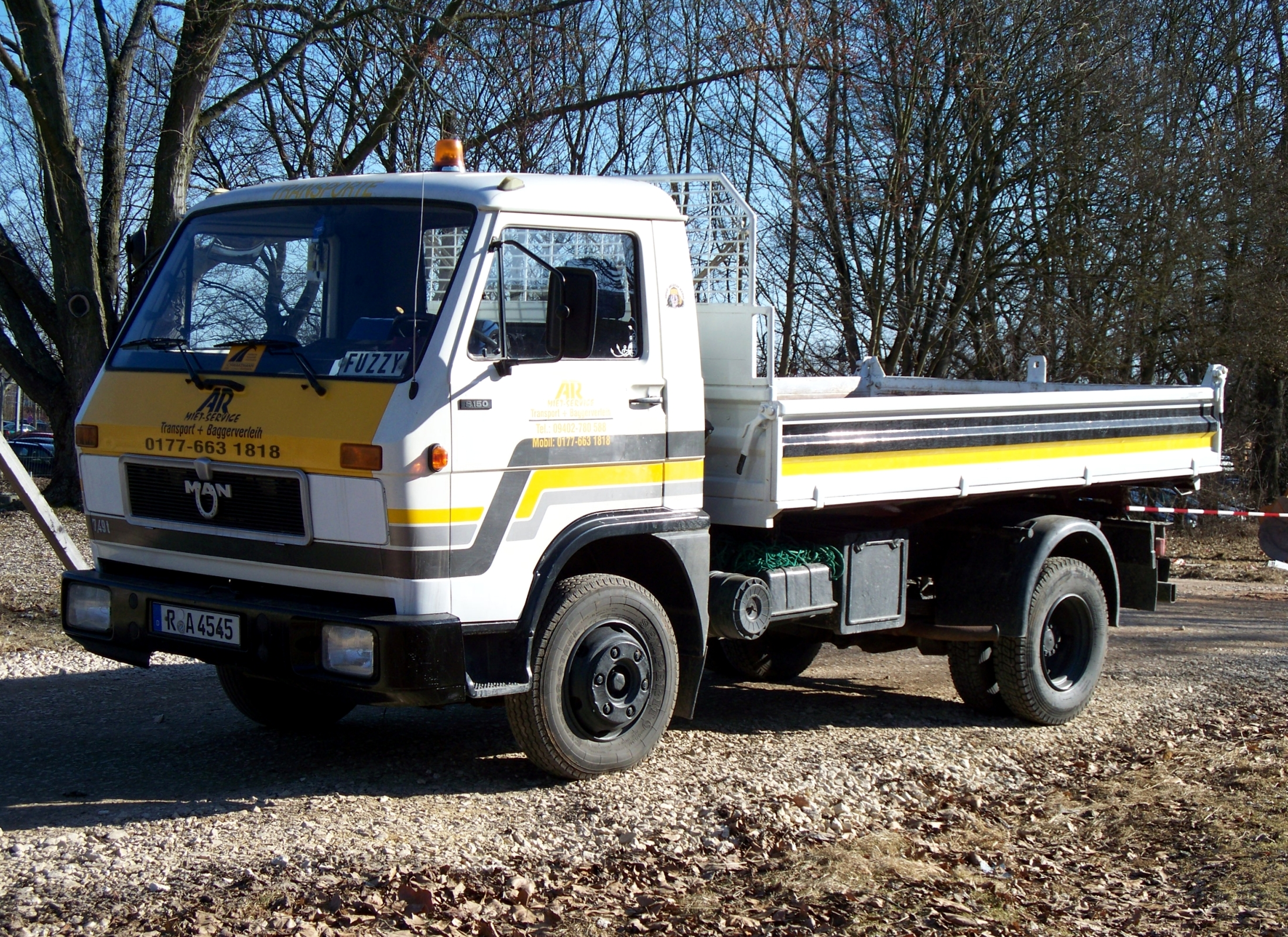
MAN 8.150 truck in Regensburg

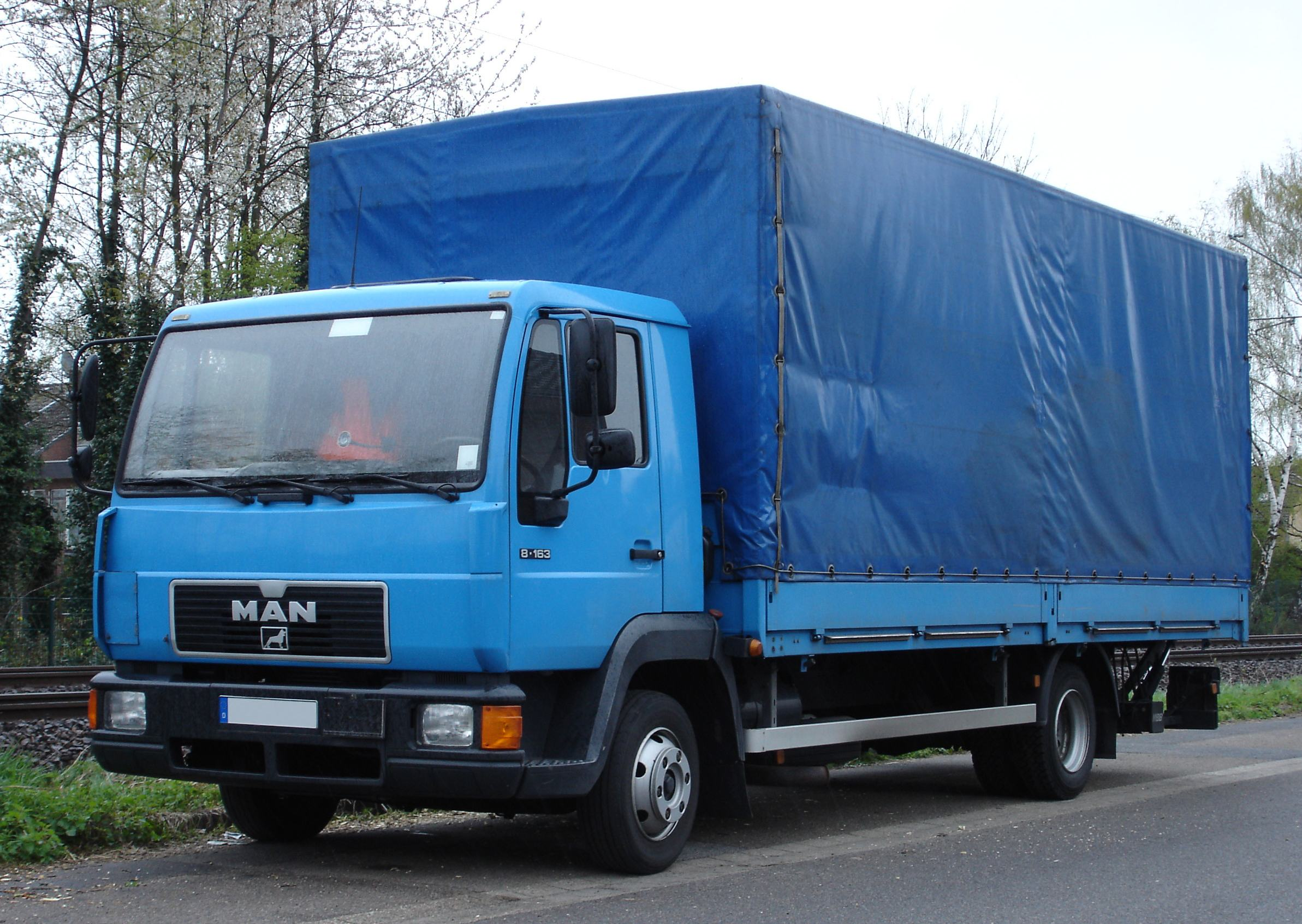
L 2000 truck

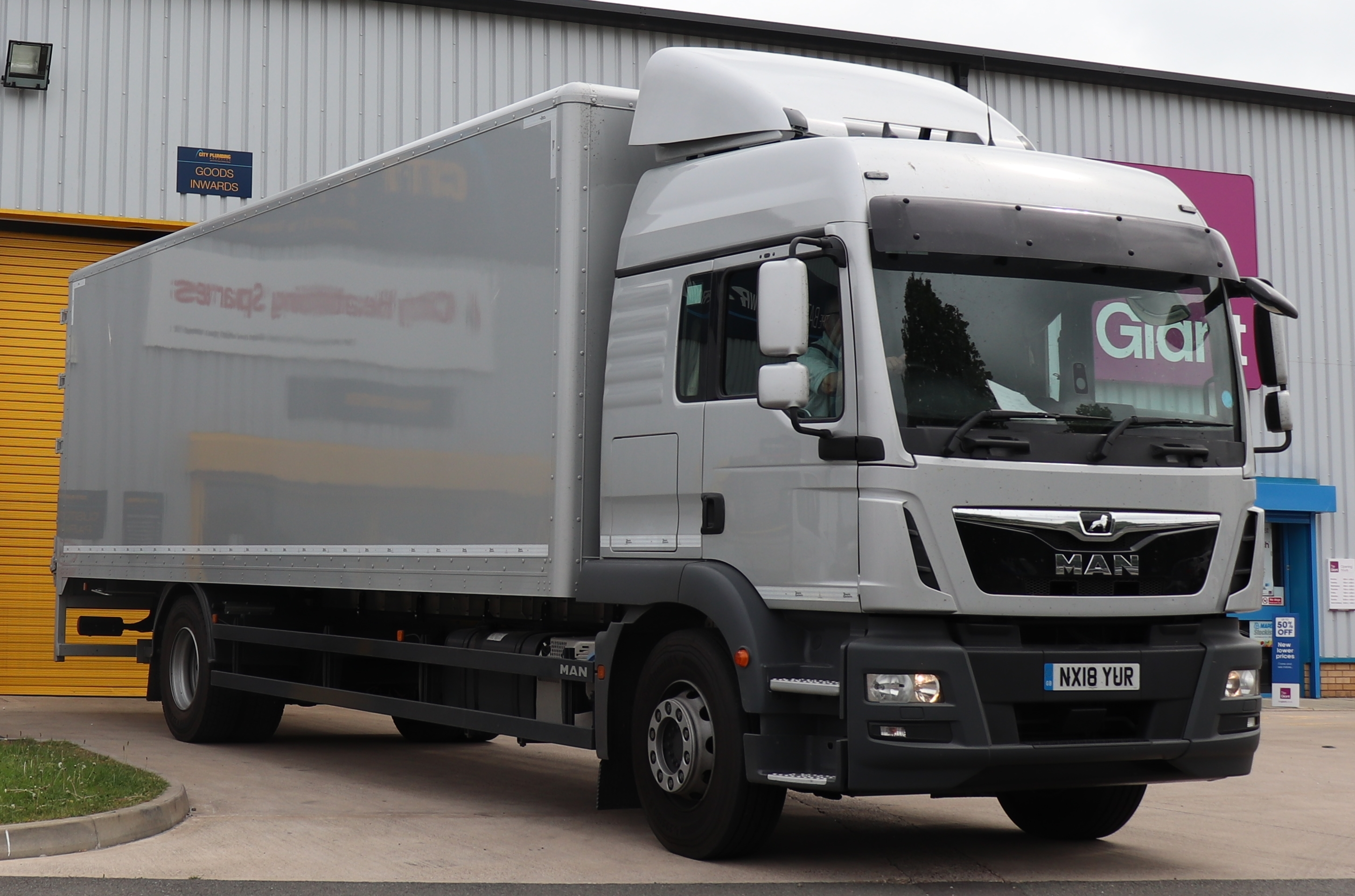
MAN TGM

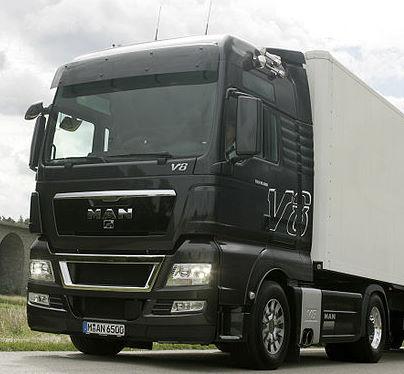
MAN TGX 18.680 V8

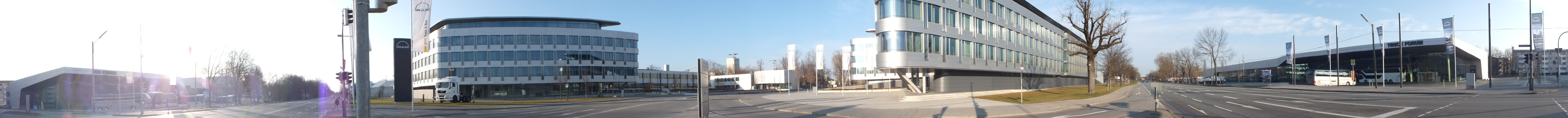
360° panorama: MTB at Dachauer Straße in Munich

=== Light truck collaborations with Saviem and Volkswagen ===
In 1897, MAN presented the first self-ignition fully functioning diesel engine, in partnership with its inventor, Rudolf Diesel. From 1967 until 1977, MAN collaborated with France's Saviem, selling their light to medium duty trucks with MAN badging in Germany and certain other markets. After the end of this, a deal was struck with Volkswagen which lasted until 1993. Production of a truck using the Volkswagen LT body started in 1979 and ended in 1993 with 72,000 units produced. It was available with four engines and four wheelbases over its lifetime; there was also a 4X4 version called 8.150 FAE. FAE means "forward control" cab, all-wheel drive, single tyres so the F nomenclature means "forward control" cab. This series is usually referred to as the G90, from the most common model, but also as the "G"-series. In the United Kingdom it was originally marketed as the "MAN MT" series. The original lineup in the UK consisted of the 6.90 and the 8.90 (the first digit denoting the GVW in tonnes, the second for power in metric horsepower) and the 8.136 and 9.136.

MAN AG supplied engines which were available in inline-four and inline-six cylinder engine configurations, with DIN rated motive power outputs of:

- 67 kilowatts (91 PS; 90 bhp)
- 75 kilowatts (102 PS; 101 bhp)
- 101 kilowatts (137 PS; 135 bhp)
- 112 kilowatts (152 PS; 150 bhp)

MAN replaced the G series with the L2000 and M2000 ranges. Several models of the MAN-VWCV and the VWCV LT ranges were marketed in Spain by Enasa as Pegaso Ekus, in a typical badge engineering operation. Peterbilt also offered this model with their badging, as the 200 or 265 model.

VWCV and MAN shared the project development in accordance with the collaboration agreement as follows:

Volkswagen Commercial Vehicles took care of:

- the tilting driver's cab including steering wheel and fixing, hand levers and foot pedals, (Note: The VW LT Mk 1 cabin was used for the MAN-VW range, the cabins are wider than the standard LT) cabins so they can fit the truck chassis
- the complete interior equipment and heating
- the manual gearbox with clutch and gear lever, the rear axle with rear-axle transmission and suspension
- the Cardan shafts including bearings
- the electrical system for the entire concept, and the platforms for the standard design.

MAN was responsible for:

- the engine including cooling, exhaust, inlet and fuel system
- the front axle with suspension and steering
- the frame with all parts for attaching the springs and axles, the steering, the batteries, the power braking system and fuel system
- the brakes, i.e. for the complete wheel brakes front and rear, the dual-circuit power brakes and parking brake
- the wheels and tyres
- the platform for special designs and tipping mechanism.

MAN-VWCVs were built in Volkswagen's Hanover factory until other Volkswagen models took priority; they were then made at MAN AG's Salzgitter-Watenstedt factory.

MAN-VWCV Range 6.90, 8.90, 6.100, 8.136, 8.100, 8.150, 9.136, 9.150 & 10.136. (Note: F & FAE are sometimes on the end of some of these model numbers.)

== Leadership ==
- Heinrich von Buz; Dr. Anton von Rieppel (1898-1911)
- Anton von Rieppel (1912-1917)
- Th. Freiherr von Cramer-Klett (1918-1921)
- Håkan Samuelsson (2005–2009)
- Georg Pachta-Reyhofen (2009–2013)
- Andreas Renschler (2015)
- Joachim Drees (2015–2020)
- Andreas Tostmann (2020–2021)
- Alexander Vlaskamp (2021–present)

== Trucks ==
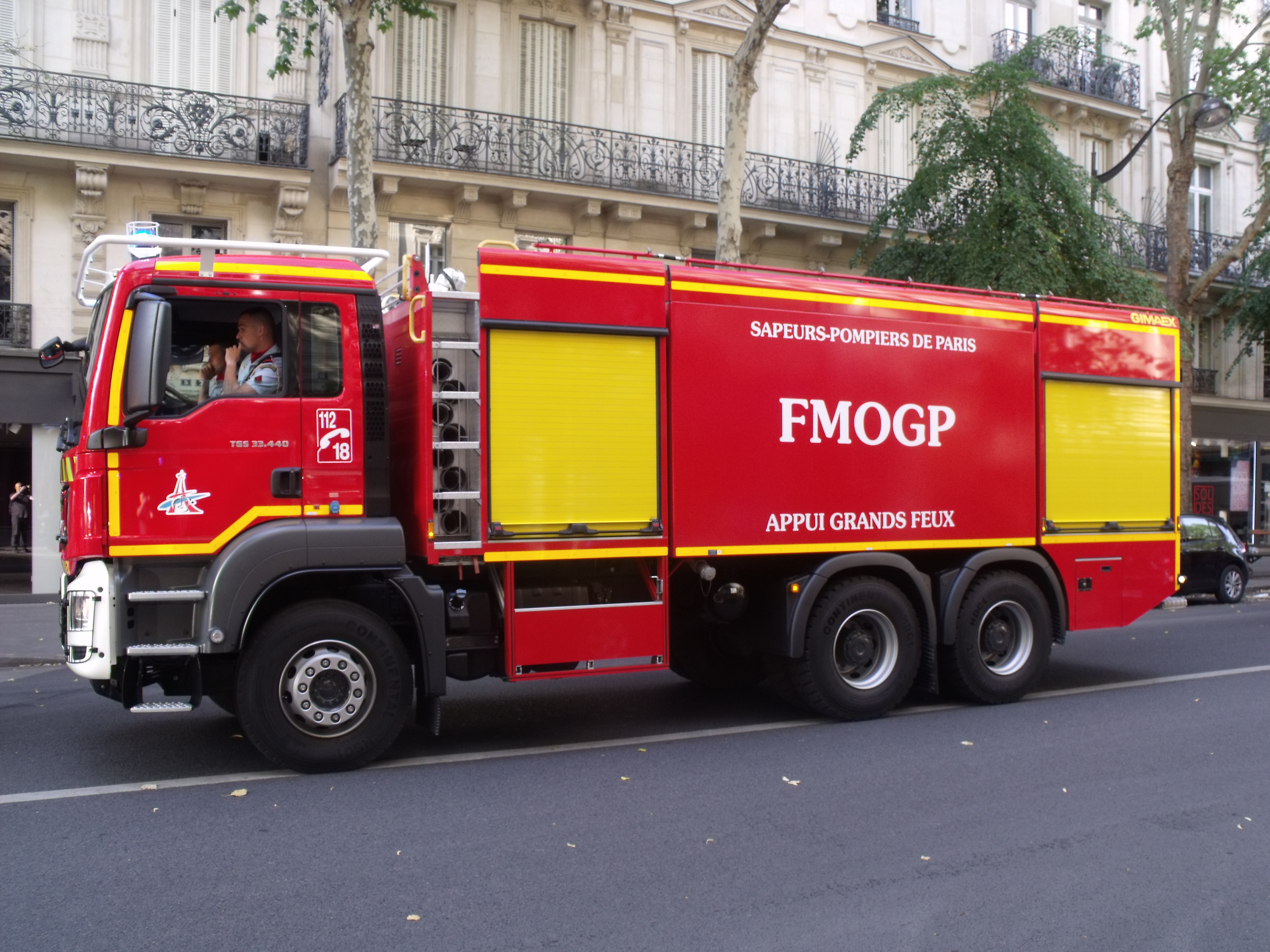
MAN TGS 33.440 of the Paris Fire Brigade

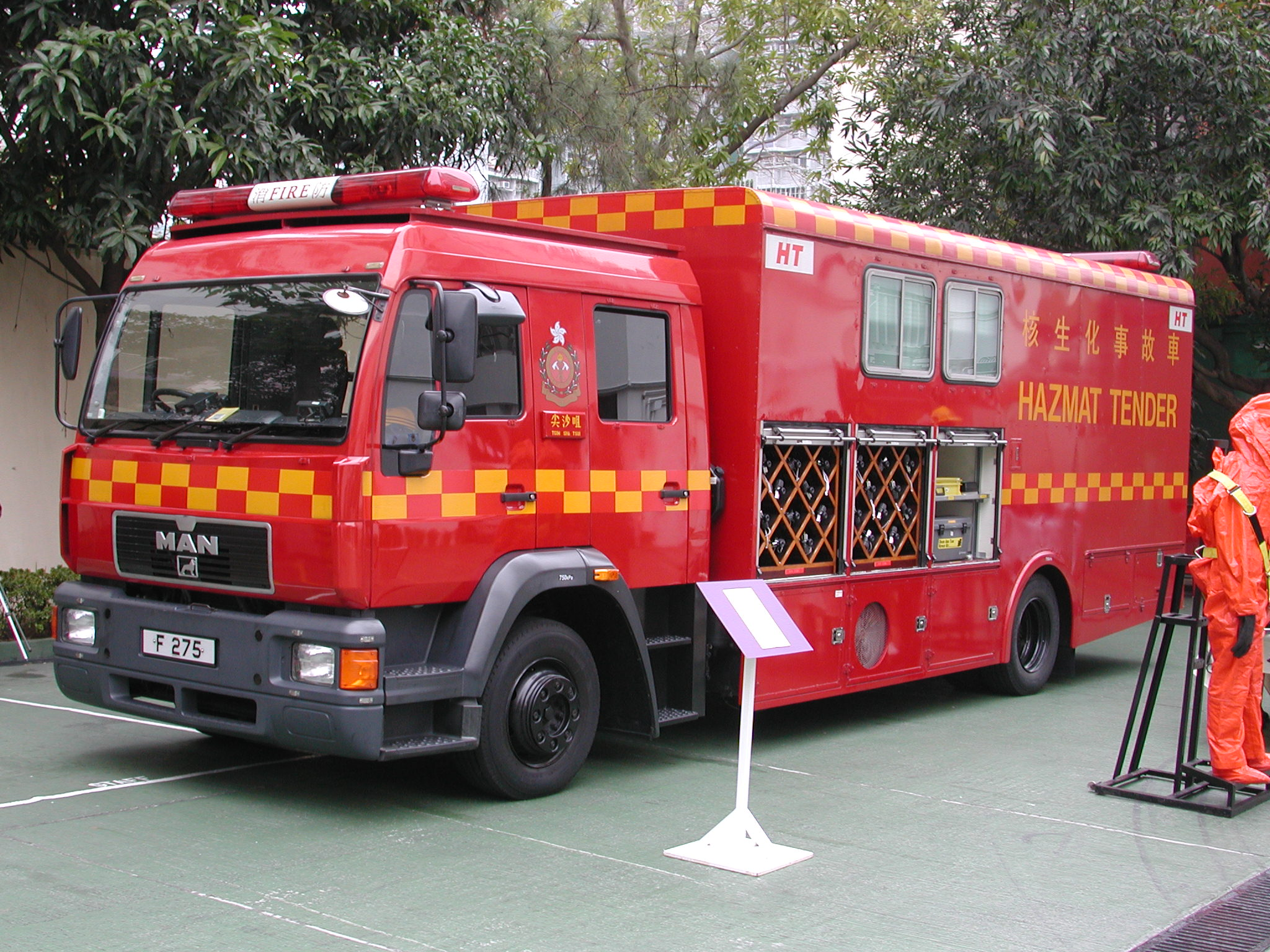
MAN LE hazmat tender of the Hong Kong Fire Services Department

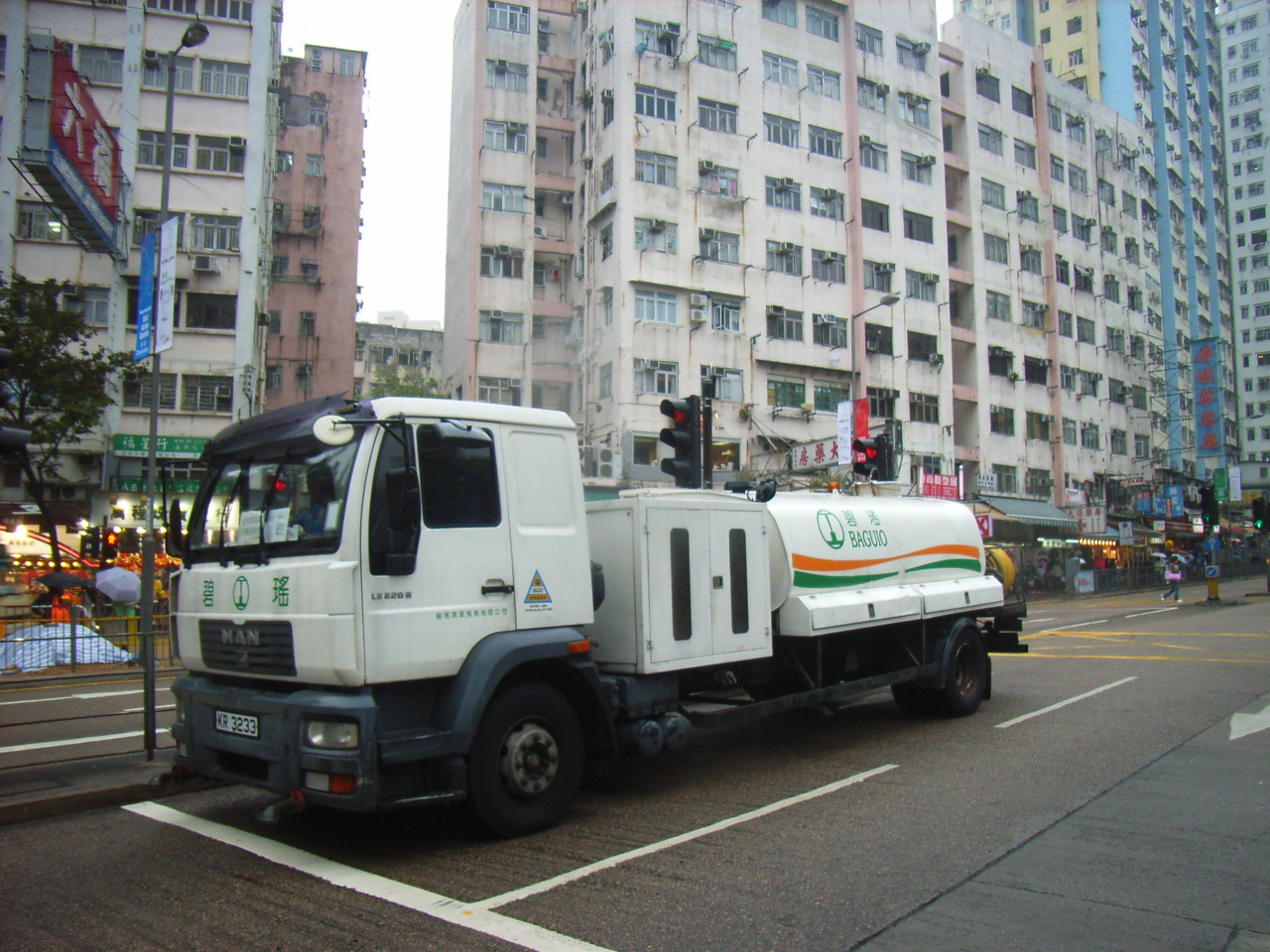
MAN LE water truck of Baguio Green Group Limited

=== Commercial trucks ===
- MAN-Saurer 2t-2,5t (1915-1918) 5.322 cc 30 hp
- MAN-Saurer 3,5t (1915-1918) 6.082 cc 36 hp
- MAN-Saurer 4t (1915-1918) 8.143 cc 45 hp
- MAN-Saurer 5t (1915-1918) 8.143 cc 45 hp
- MAN 2 Zc (1919-1927) 5.322 cc 30 hp
- MAN 3 Zc (1919-1925) 6.305 cc 40 hp
- MAN ZK5 (1919-1925) 8.143 cc 50 hp
- MAN KVB (1926-1934) 7.479 cc 55 hp
- MAN S1 H6 (1926-1934) 12.215 cc 150 hp
- MAN F1 H6 (1929-1934) 9.408 cc 100 hp
- MAN Z1 (1933-1937) 6.234 cc 70 hp
- ML 4500 S (1943-1946) 7.983 cc 120 hp
- MAN MK (1945-1957) 7.983 cc 120 hp
- MAN F8 (1950-1963) 11.633 cc 180 hp
- MAN 630 L1 (1953-1955) 8.276 cc 130 hp
- MAN G (1979-1987)(1987-1994) 3.791 cc 90 hp; 5.687 cc 136 hp [72.000 units]
- LE / L2000
- ME / M2000 evolution
- FE / F2000
- CLA
- TGL, with hybrid trucks (MAN TGL Optistrang and TGL EDA).
- TGM
- TGA
- TGX / TGS – a variant of the TGS model was used for Dakar Rally
- MAN TGE - A rebadged Volkswagen Crafter.

Until 2007, MAN also built the badge-engineered ERF trucks for the UK market.

=== Military trucks ===
Rheinmetall MAN Military Vehicles, a joint venture with Rheinmetall, produces a range of tactical trucks:

- HX
- LX / FX
- SX

Earlier ventures with US Army produced the "LD" multifuel diesel engine line used on M35 2 1/2-ton and M54 5-ton trucks

== Buses ==
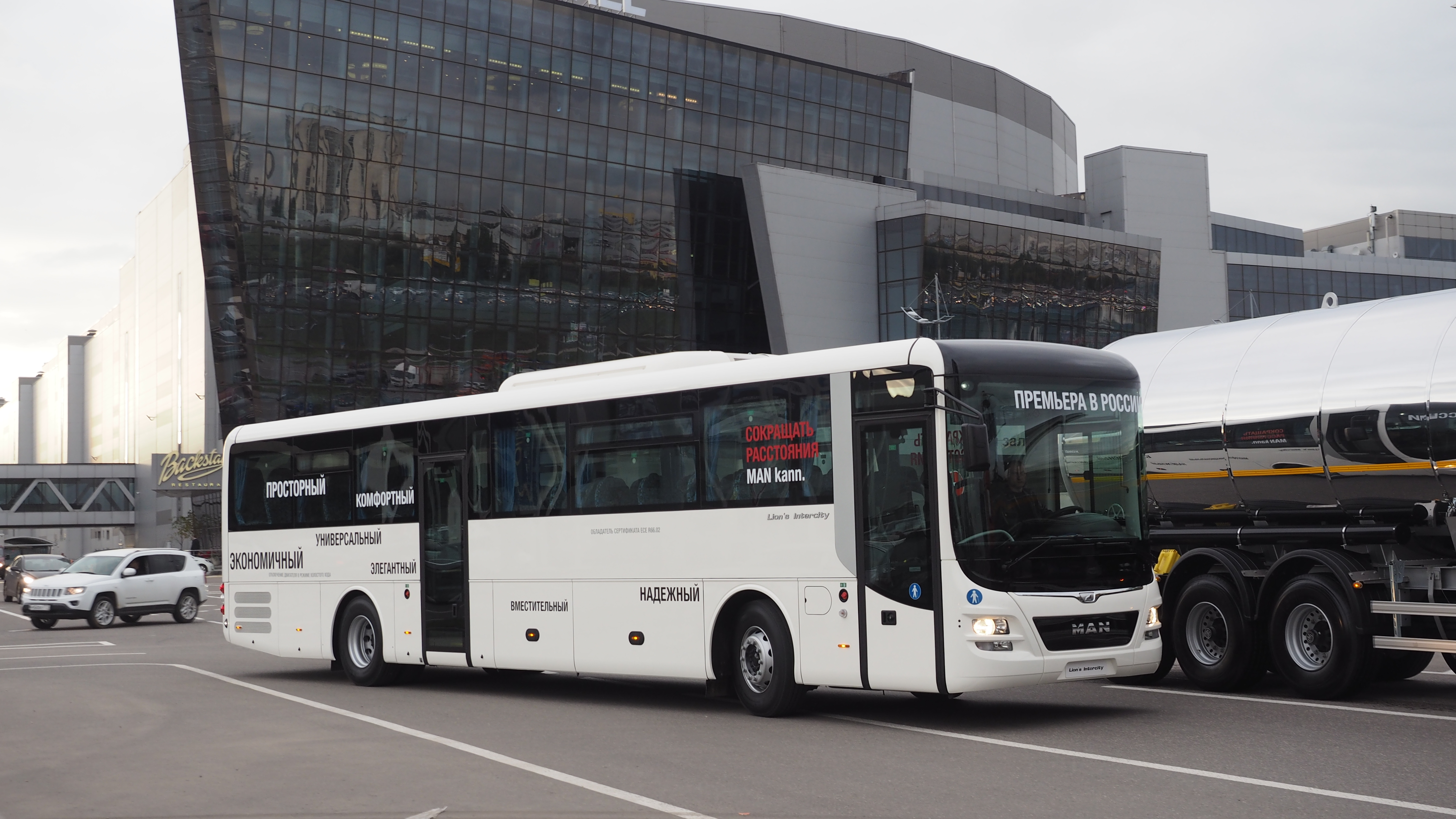
MAN Lion's Intercity

=== Current ===
- Lion's City, city and inter-urban buses
- Lion's Coach, coaches
- Lion's Intercity, inter-urban buses
- Lion's Explorer

=== Historical ===
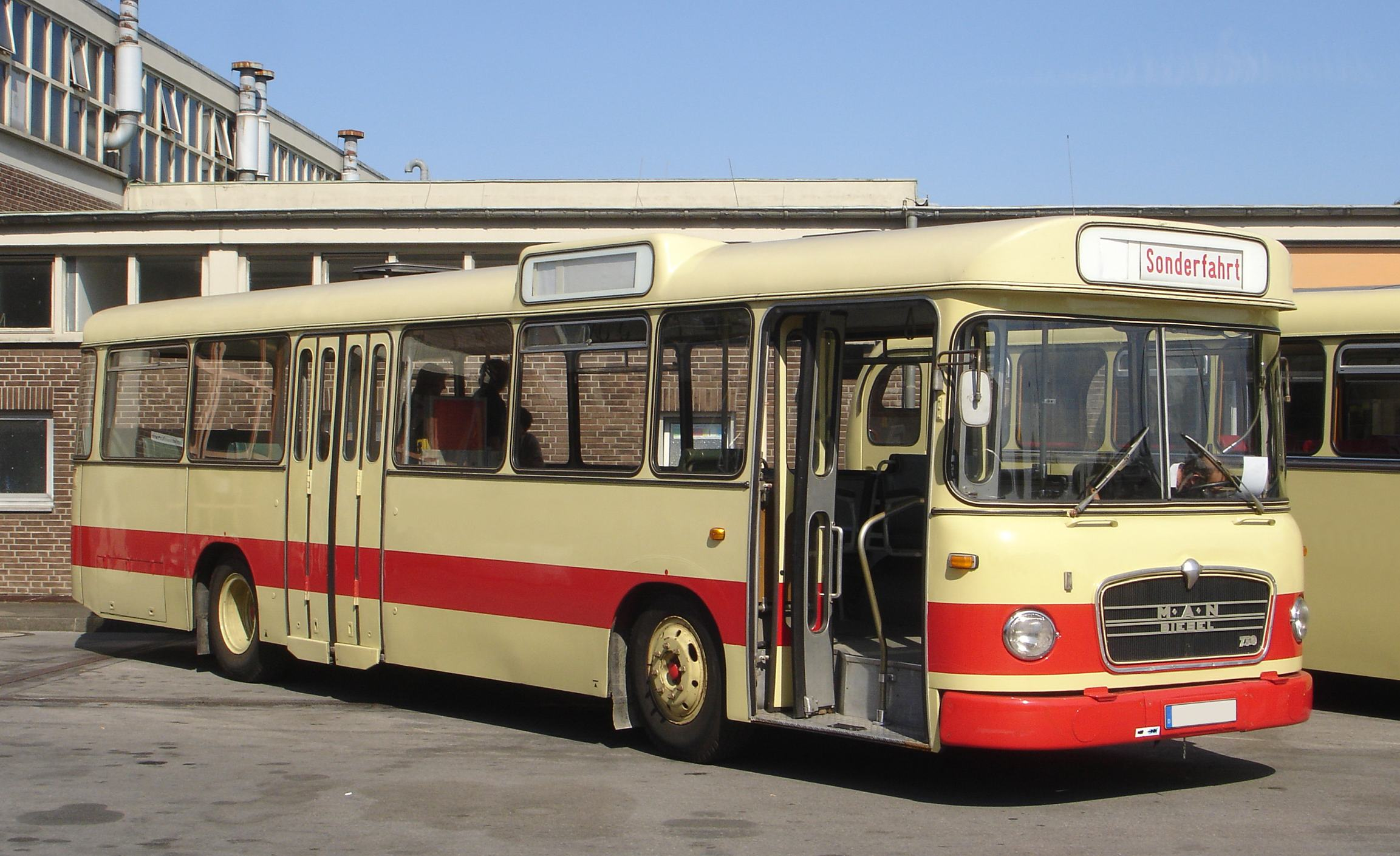
MAN 750 HO

The first integral buses

- 760 UO, underfloor engine (1957–?)
- MAN/Krauss-Maffei Metrobus (de)
  - 640 HO (1959–1962)
  - 750 HO (1962–1974)
- 890 UO, underfloor engine
- 890 UG, articulated bus, underfloor engine
- 535 HO, regional bus and coach

VöV-Standard buses, 1st generation

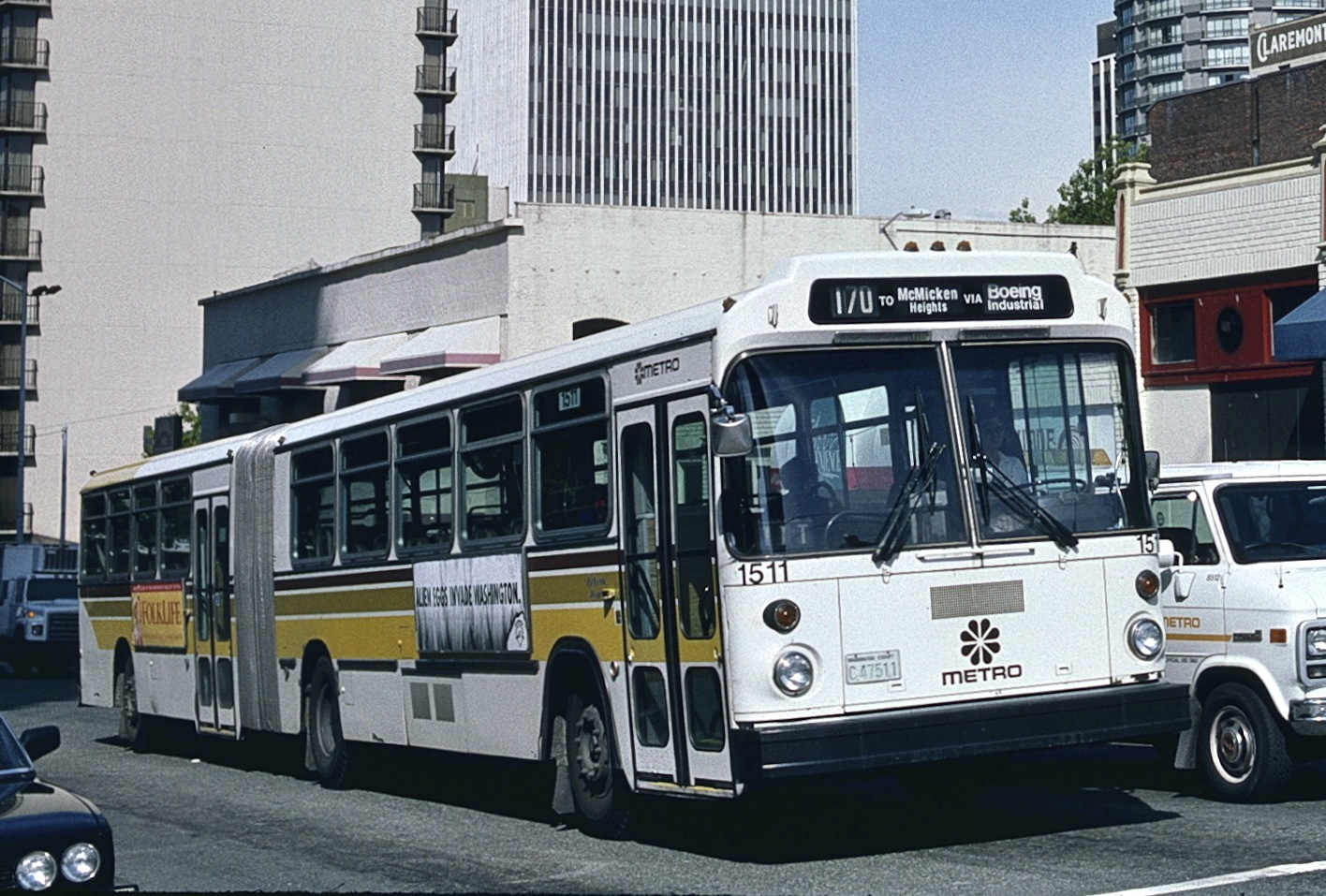
MAN SG 220-18-2 in Seattle

- 750 HO-SL (renamed SL 192 from 1972), city bus (1968–1973)
- 750 HO-SÜ (renamed SÜ 230 from 1972), regional bus (1970–1975)
- 890 SG (renamed SG 192 from 1972), articulated bus, underfloor engine (1970–1980)
- SL 200, city bus (1973–1988)
- SÜ 240, regional bus (1972–1989)
- SD 200, double-decker bus (1973–1985)
- SG 220, articulated bus, underfloor engine (1978–1983)
- SG 240/280 H, articulated bus, rear engine (1980–1986)
- North-American models:
  - SG 220, articulated bus, underfloor engine (1978–1983)
  - SG 310, articulated bus, underfloor engine (1981–1988)

VöV-Standard buses, 2nd generation

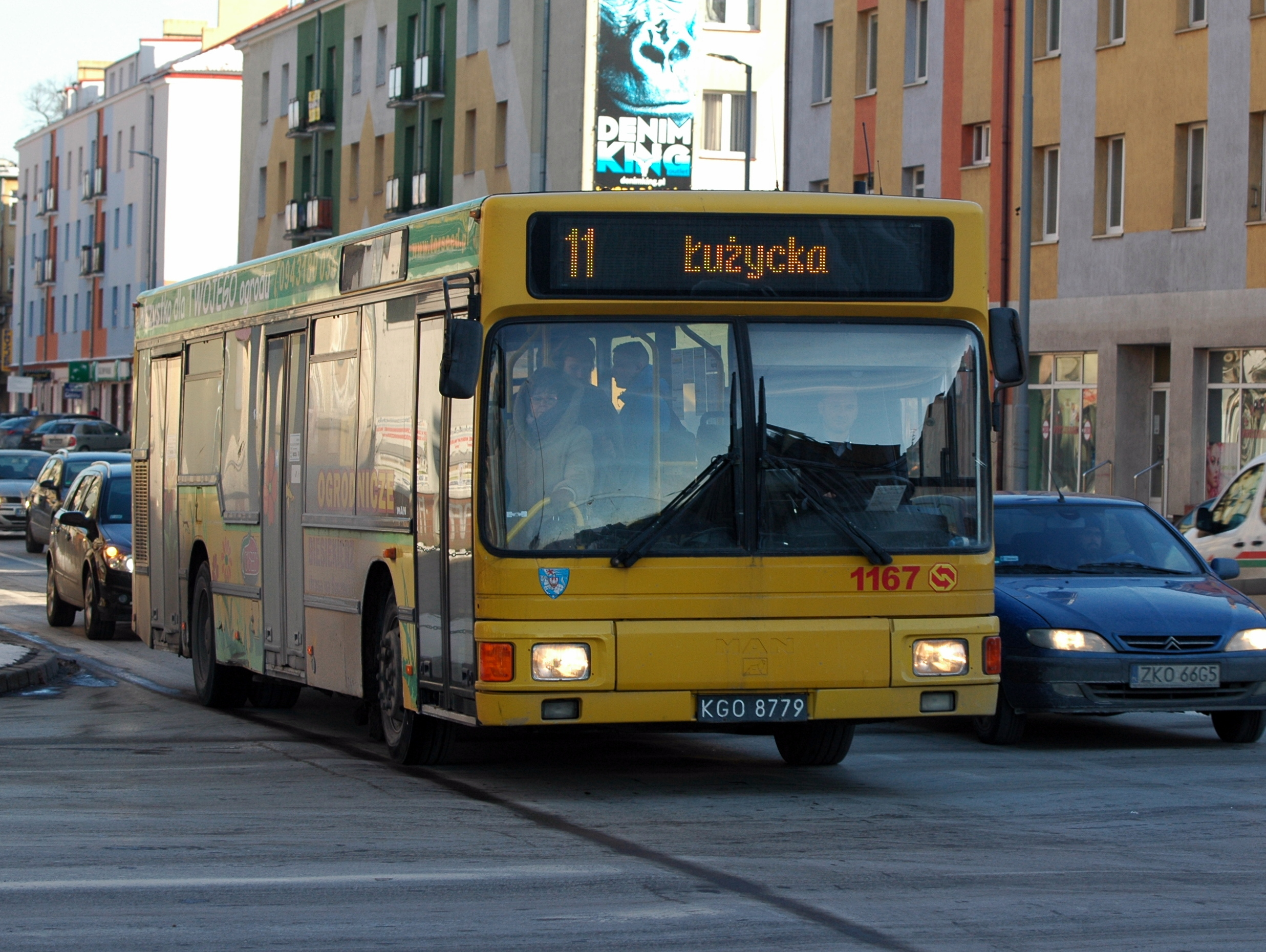
MAN NL 222

- SL 202, city bus (1984–1993)
- SG 242/282 H, "puller" articulated bus (1985–1990)
- SG 242/262/292/312/322, "pusher" articulated bus (1986–1999)
- SD 202, double-decker bus (1986–1992)
- SÜ 242/272/292/312/322, regional bus (1987–1998)
- SM 152/182, midibus (1989–1992)
- NL 202, low-floor bus with podium-mounted seats (1989–1992)
- NG 272, low-floor articulated bus with podium-mounted seats (1990–1992)
- NM 152/182, low-floor midibus with podium-mounted seats (1990–1993)
- NL 202/222/262/312, low-floor bus with podium-mounted seats in rear part only (1992–1998)
  - MAN NL 262 R, right-hand drive version for Hong Kong (1997–1999)
- NG 262/272/312, low-floor articulated bus with podium-mounted seats in rear part only (1992–2000)
- NM 152/192, low-floor midibus with podium-mounted seats in rear part only (1993–1998)
- ND 202, low-floor double-decker bus (1995)
- EL 202/222/262/272, low-entry bus (1993–2001)
- North-American models:
  - SL 40-102 "Americana", transit bus (1984–1988)

Post-VöV-Standard buses

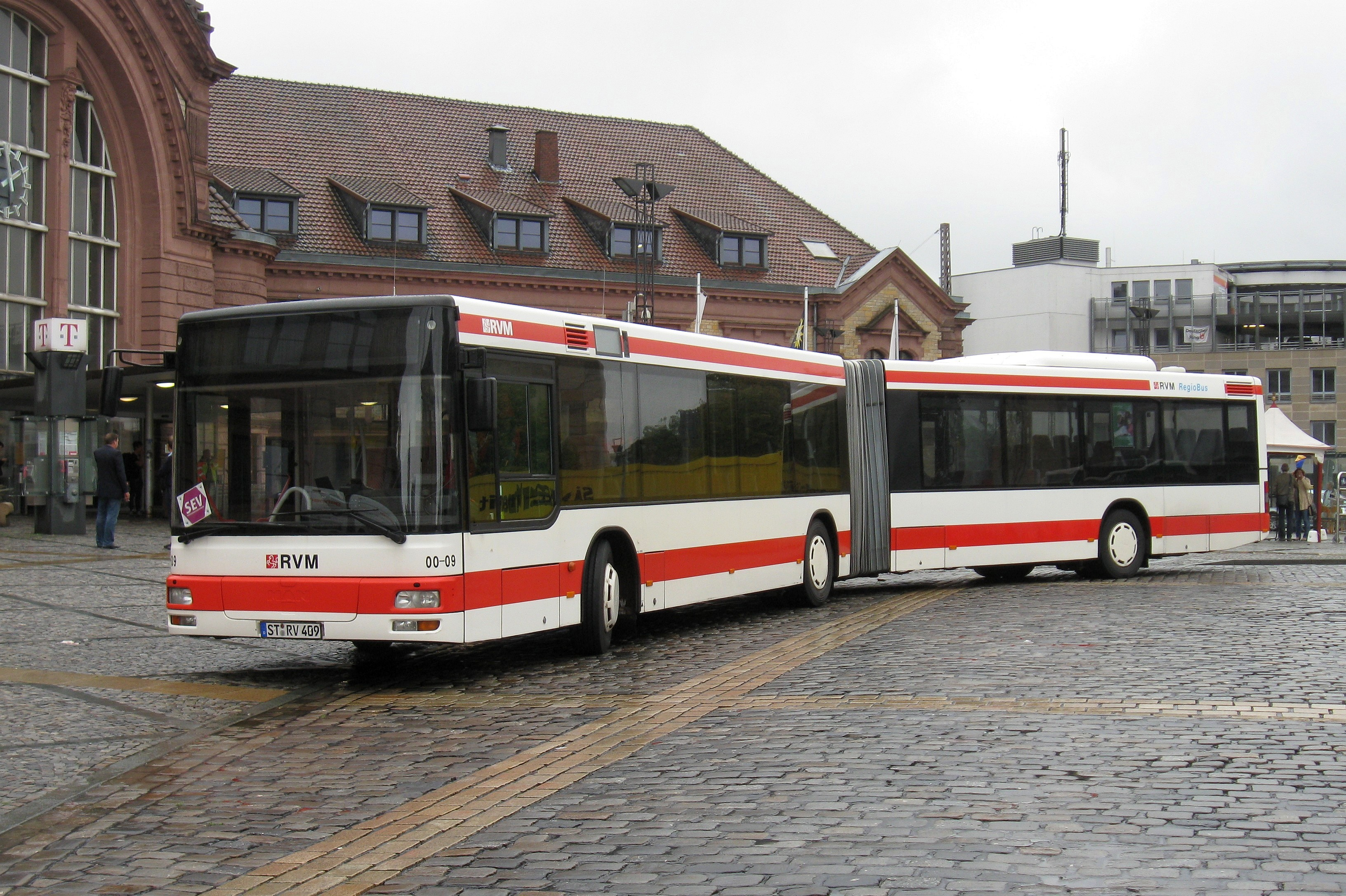
MAN NG 313

- 1st generation Lion's City city- / inter-urban buses (1996–2004)
  - NÜ 223/233/263/283/313, low-floor inter-urban bus (1996–2004)
    - NÜ 313/353-15, 14.7-metre version (1998–2004)
  - NL 223/233/243/263/283/313, low-floor city bus (1997–2004) (also known as Lion's Line)
    - NL 313/353-15, 14.7-metre version (1999–2004) (also known as Lion's Line XXL)
  - NM 223/283, low-floor midibus (1997–2004) (also known as Lion's Midi and Lion's Single)
  - NG 223/243/263/313/353/363, low-floor articulated bus (1997–2004)
  - EL 223/263/283/293, low-entry bus (2003–2008) (also known as Lion's City T and Lion's City TÜ)
- Lion's Classic city- / inter-urban buses (1999–2010) (unnamed until 2004)
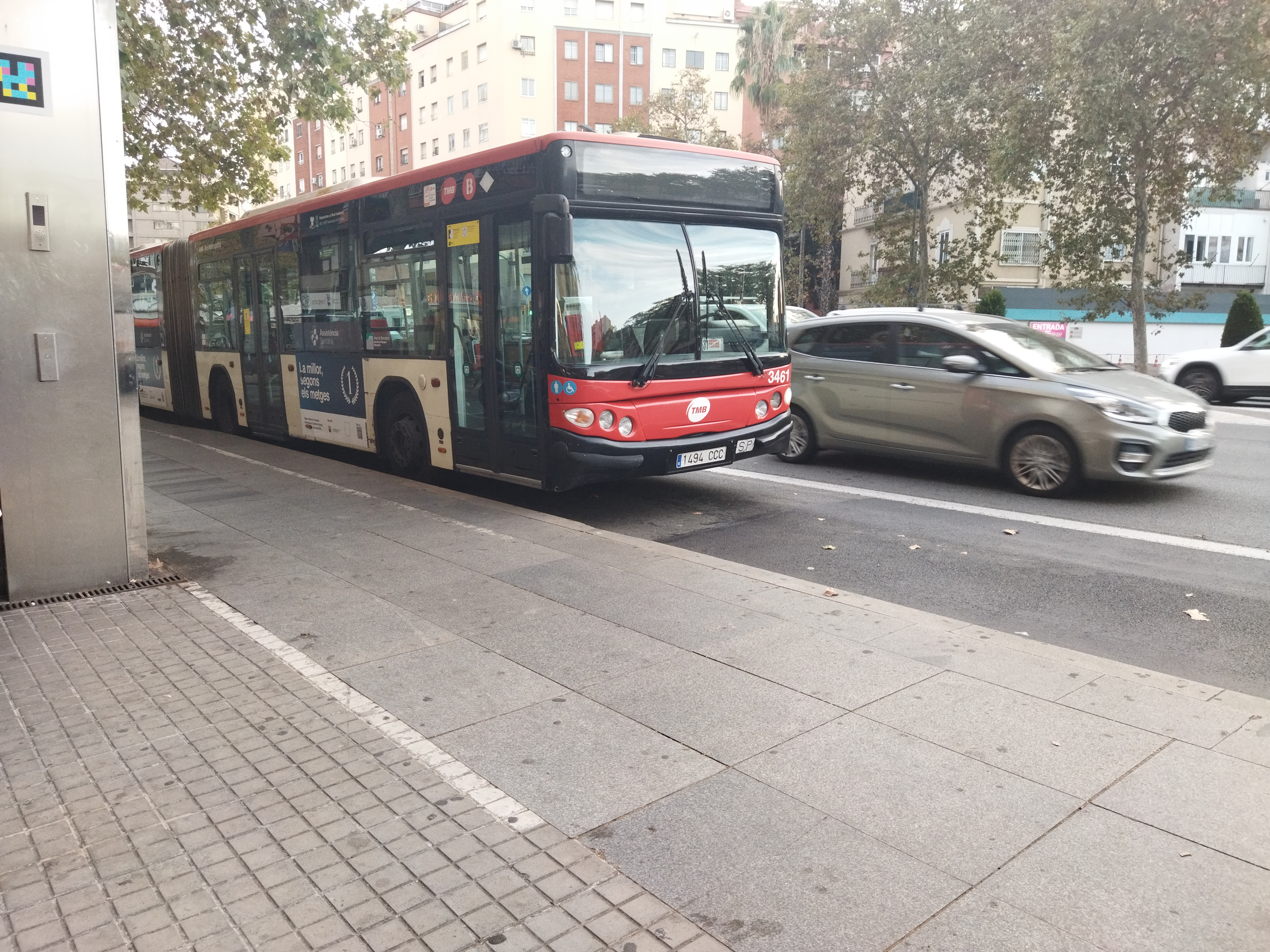
  MAN NG 313 with a Castrosua CS 40 body (MAN NG 313 F). Barcelona, Spain
  - SG 263/313, articulated bus (2001–2008) (also known as Lion's Classic G from 2004)
  - SL 223/263/283 (2000–2010) (also known as Lion's Classic from 2004)
  - SÜ 283/313 (1999–2009) (also known as Lion's Compact, as Lion's Classic Ü from 2004)

Regional buses

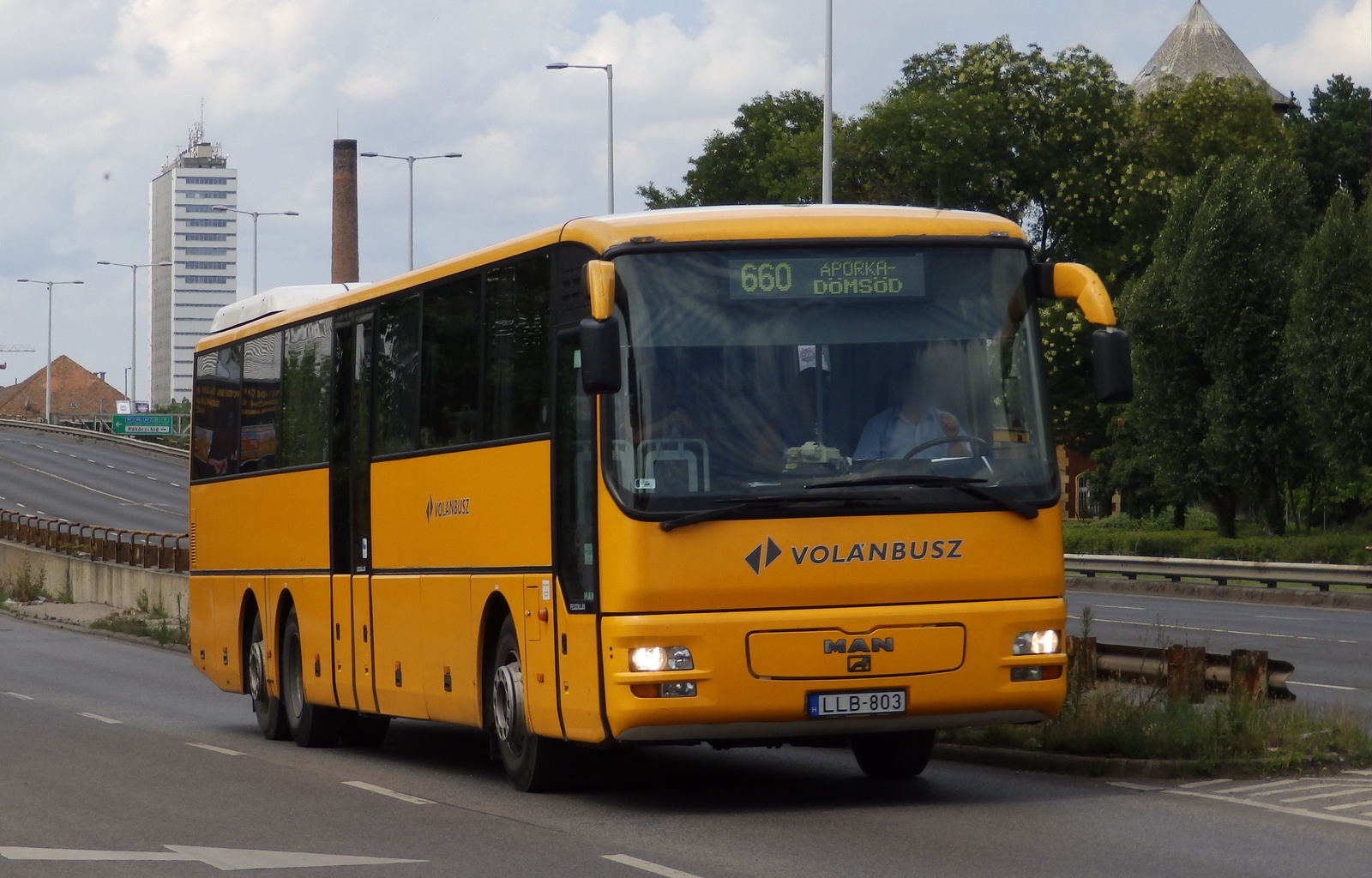
MAN ÜL 363–13,7

- RÜ 240/280 (1980–1988)
- ÜL 242/272/292/312/322 (1990–1996)
  - ÜM 192/222, midibus
- ÜL 313/353/363 (1996–2004)
  - R 353/363 Lion's Comfort
- Lion's Regio (2004–2017)

Coaches

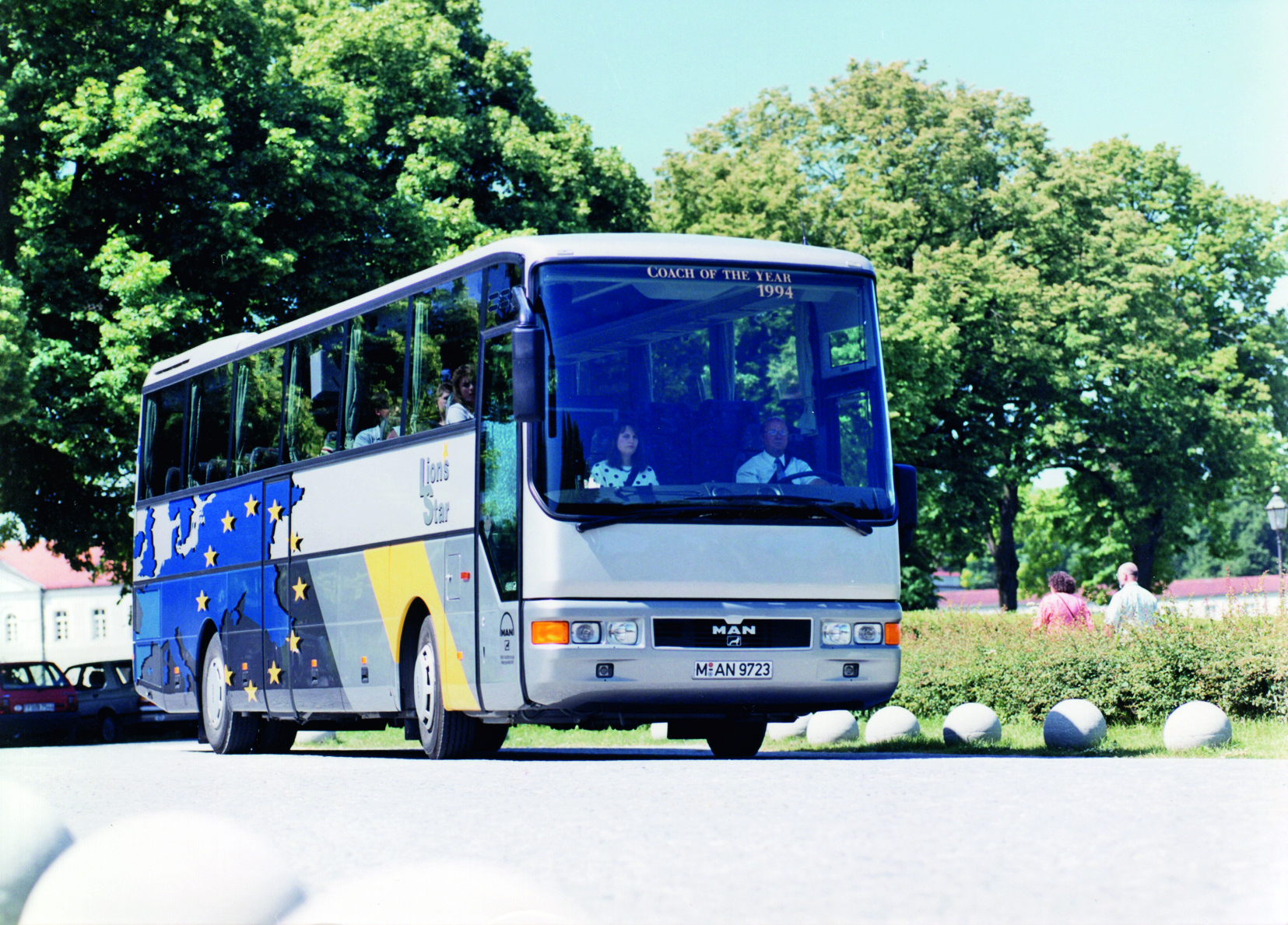
MAN Lion's Star demonstrator

- SR 240/280 (1975–1984)
  - SR 240/280 H, high-decker version (1978–1984)
- SR 321/361 (?–?)
  - SR 321/361 H, high-decker version (?–?)
- SR 292/362 (renamed FR 292/362 from 1990) (1985–1993)
  - SR 292/362 H (renamed FRH 292/362 from 1990), high-decker version (1985–1993)
- Lion's Star (1991–2006, replaced by Lion's Coach Supreme)
  - FRH 422/402 (1991–1998)
  - RH 403/463 (1998–2001)
  - RHS 414/464/484 (2001–2006)
- 1st generation Lion's Coach: RH 353/363/403/413/423/463 (1996–2003)

== Chassis ==
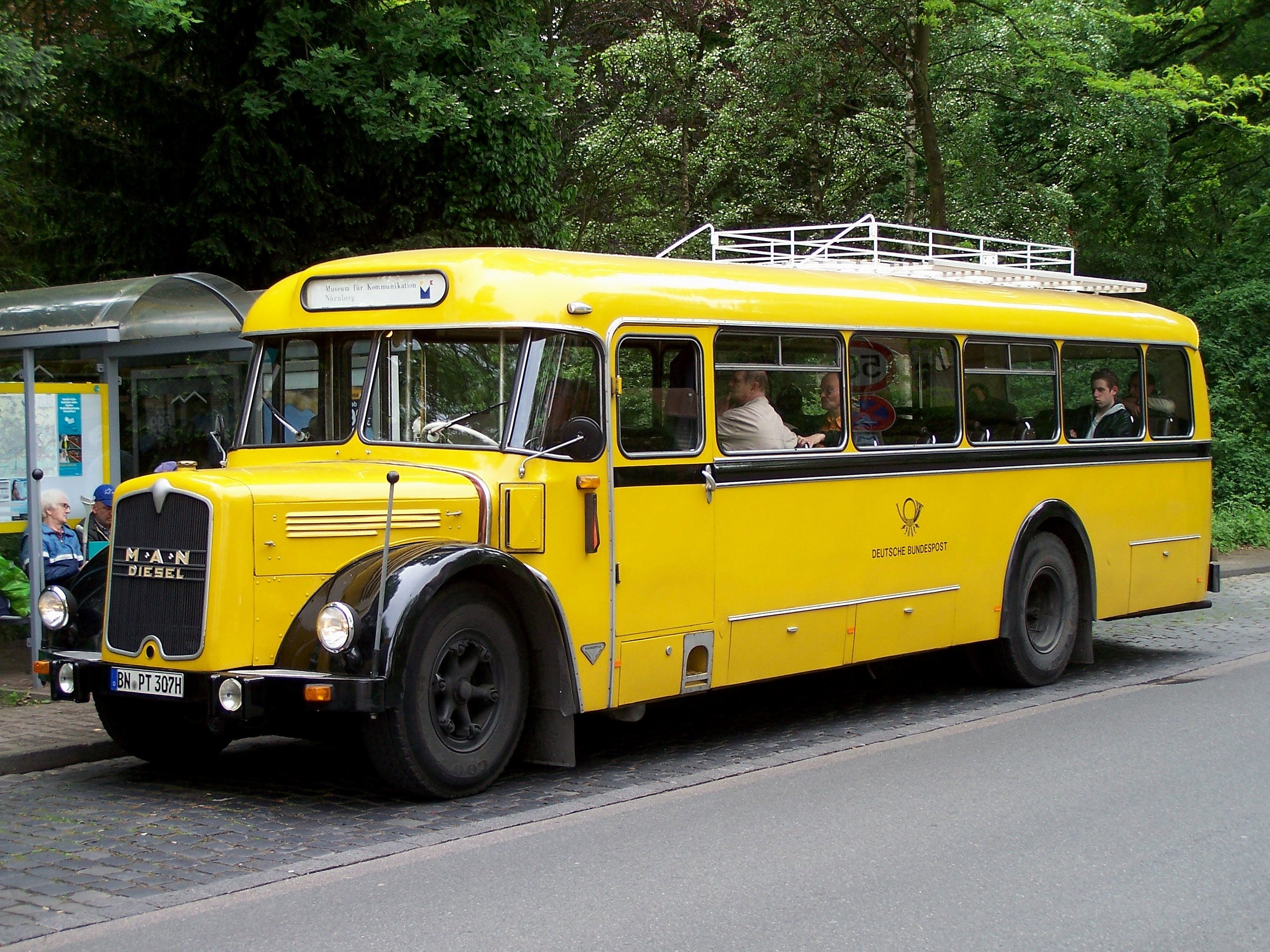
Hubertia-bodied MAN MKN 630

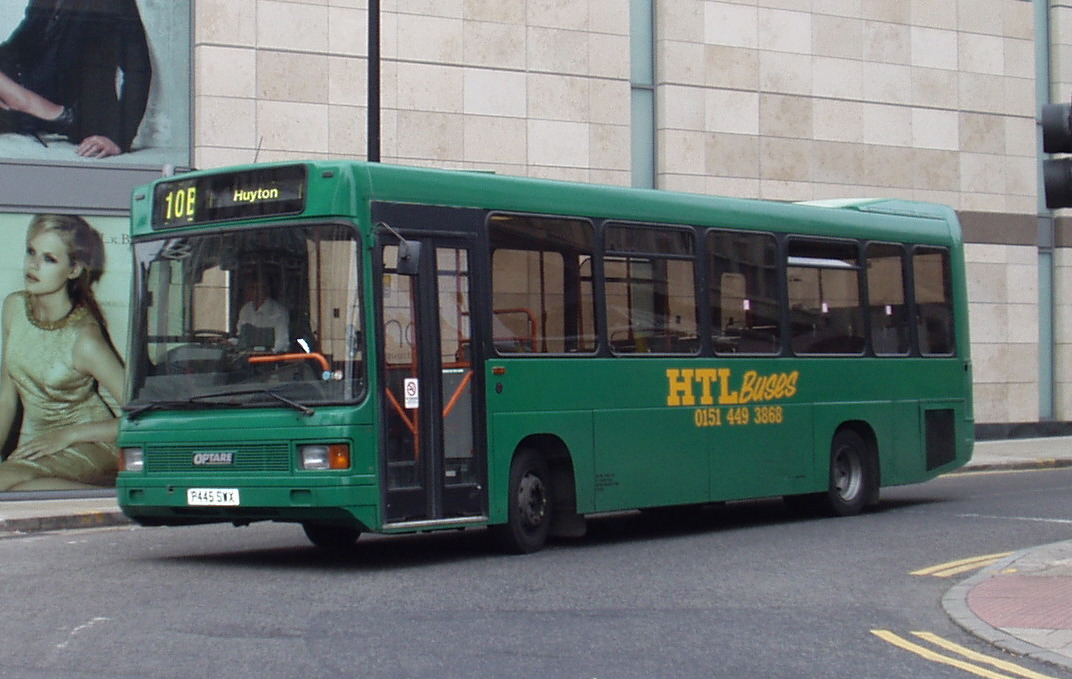
Optare-Vecta–bodied MAN 11.190 HOCL

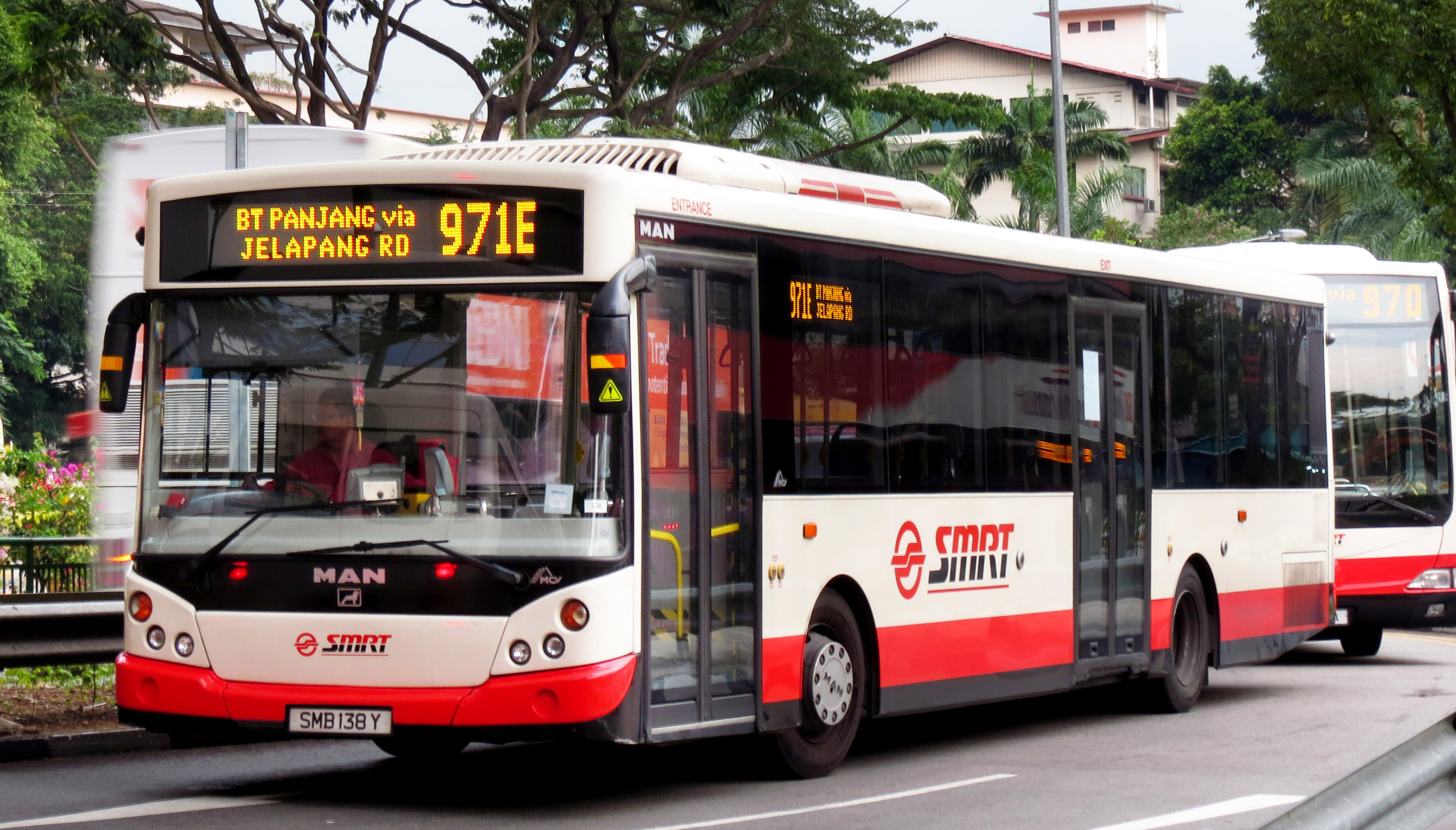
MCV-Evolution–bodied MAN NL 323 F

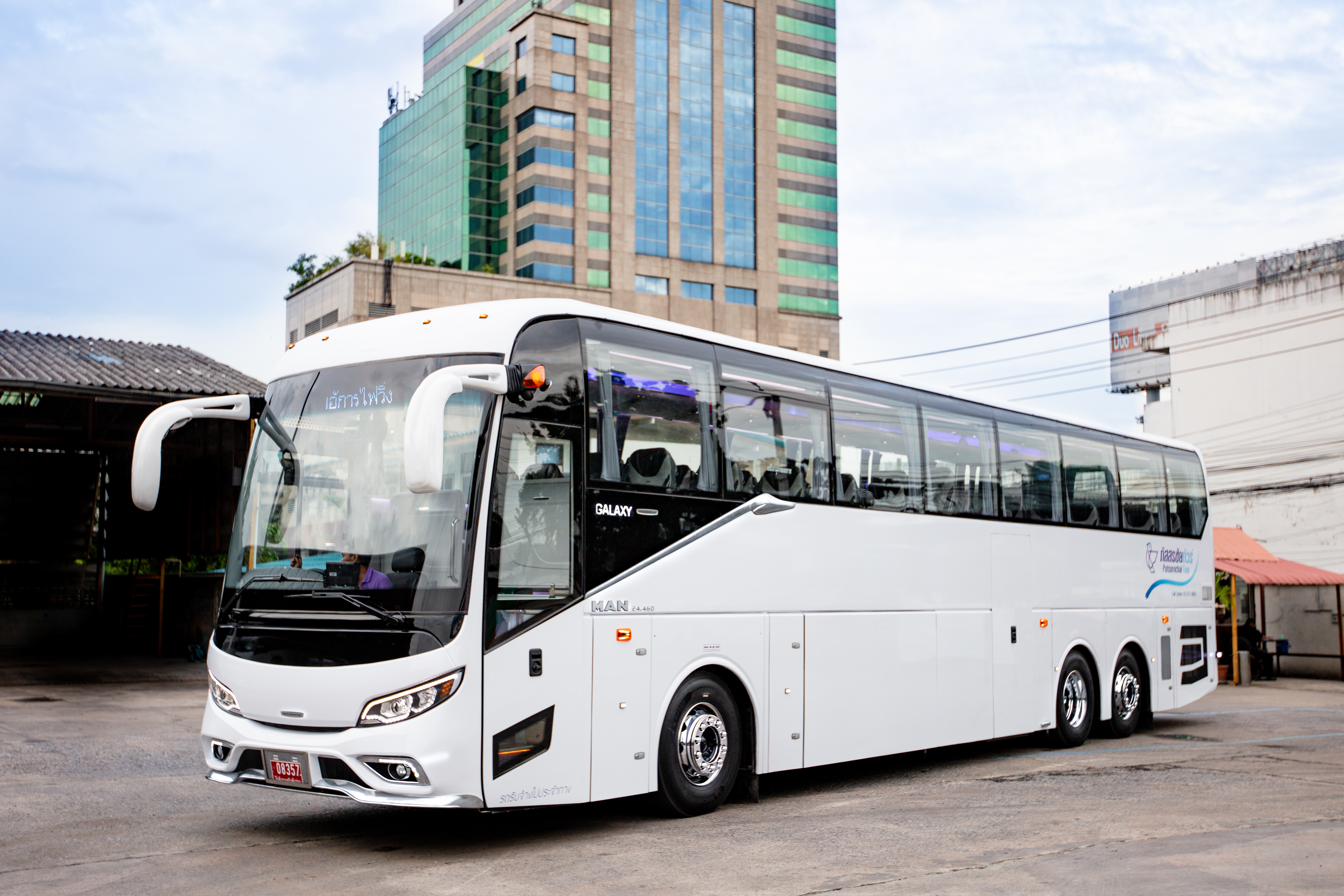
Galaxy Patsornchai based on MAN 24.460 R40 (chassis-in-box version of MAN R37), body and chassis assembled in Thailand

- MKN (1948–1950)
- MKN 26 (1950–1954)
- MKN 630 (1954–1956)
- MKH 2
- MKH 4
- 530 HOC (1955–?)
- 535 HOC (1956–?)
- 545 HOC
- 558 HOC (1956–?)
- 420 HOC (1957–1963)
- 10.xxx FOCL (L53) front-engined midi
- 10.xxx HOCL (469) midi
- 11.xxx HOCL midi
- 12.xxx HOCL-NL (A76) low-floor midi
- 12.xxx HOCL (A77) midi
- 13.xxx HOCL/SR (A53) midi
- 14.xxx HOCL-NL (A66) low-entry
- 14.xxx HOCL (A67)
- 16.xxx HOCL (470/475)
- 18.2x0 HOCL-NL (A69) low-entry
- 18.xxx HOCL (A51/A55/A91/R33/RR2/RR3 (chassis in box))
- 19.xxx HOCL (R33)
- 24.xxx HOCLN (474/A54/R37/R40 (chassis in box))
- 24.xxx HOCLNR-NL (A57/A59)
- 28.xxx HGOCL (A61)
- Aerobus (India)
- 18.250 (CLA)
- 22.300 (CLA)
- EL 202 F (A17) low-entry
- ND 202 F (A14) low-floor double-decker
- NL 202 F (898/A29) low-floor
- ND xx3 F (A34/A48/A95) low-floor double-decker
- NG xx3 F (A24) articulated low-floor
- NL xx3 F (A22) low-floor
- NM xx3 F (A35) low-floor midi
- SL 18.xxx HOC (A89)
- SÜ xx3 F (A91)
- Lion's Chassis low-entry, intercity and coach (modular)

== Production sites ==
=== Trucks ===
Heavy range

- Munich (GER)
- Niepołomice (POL)

Light and medium range

- Steyr (A) sold to Steyr Automotive GmbH

Special-purpose vehicles

- Vienna (A)

Year	trucks	military trucks	5t BW 4×4 Category I (contained in military trucks)	7t BW 6×6 Category I (contained in military trucks)	10t BW 8×8 Category I (contained in military trucks)	CKD	components	model
1915	118+5	118 trucks from the Lindau plant; five from the factory in Nuremberg						
1916	↓							
1917	↓							
1918	665 (Sum 1915-1918)							
1921	370							
1945	303							
1950	1.440							
1960	Anniversary truck No. 30.000 produced							
1965	13.844 [Between 1955 and 1965, 100,000 trucks were produced at the Munich-Allach plant.]							
1966								
1967						Istanbul ~300		
1968								MAN F8
1969								MAN F8
1970	11.865	761				1.234	1.227	415, 6.115H, 415HA, 7.126, MAN F8
1971	15.283	452				1.085	1.810	6.115H, MAN F8
1972	12.437	50				1.228	2.884	MAN F8
1973	12.142	12				2.115	9.324	MAN F8
1974	13.242	102				2.006	29.398	MAN F8
1975	12.496	0				1.750	9.683	MAN F8
1976	13.124	201				2.443	14.675	MAN F8
1977	13.651	3.297	479	183	2.416	1.923	13.376	MAN F8
1978	13.131	3.252	1.899	614	729	1.652	10.534	MAN F8
1979	14.878	2.406	487	1.435	481	1.268	5.790	MAN F8
1980	20.484	1.300	682	205	0	2.035	4.118	MAN F8
1981	21.371	615	50	267	279	2.051	3.281	MAN F8
1982	16.902	167	4	140	11	1.506	3.379	MAN F8
1983	15.293	837	0	60	3	778	2.877	MAN F8
1984	15.526	549				1.318	2.620	MAN F8
1985	17.408	180				1.159	2.215	MAN F8
1986	19.370	344				603	1.710	MAN F8
1987								
1988								
1989								
2009						100 UZ		
2010						480 UZ		
2011						658 UZ		
2012						1.016 UZ		
2013						1.300 UZ		
2014						1.400 UZ		
Sum								

=== Buses ===
- Ankara (TUR): MANAŞ - premium coaches, standard coaches, double-decker coaches, intercity buses, city buses for MAN & Neoplan
- Sady (POL) - moved to Starachowice
- Starachowice (POL) - city buses, bus and coach chassis, components ( in future: premium coaches, standard coaches, double-decker coaches, intercity buses)
- Carmona (PH) - bus bodies built by Almazora Motors Corporation
- Santa Rosa (PH) - bus bodies built by Santarosa Motor Works, Inc. (Columbian Manufacturing Corp.)
- Quezon City (PH) - bus bodies built by Del Monte Motor Works, Inc.

Year	Omnibus	bus chassis	CKD	components	model
1915					
1916					
1917					
1918					
1921					
1945					
1950					
1960					
1965					
1966					
1967					
1968					MAN 750 HO M 11 A
1969					
1970	1.046	15	0	0	
1971	1.764	0	64	0	
1972	1.441	0	359	0	
1973	1.307	0	361	0	MAN SL200
1974	1.312	143	306	1.834	MAN SL200
1975	1.397	285	253	2.235	MAN SL200
1976	1.923	620	278	2.275	MAN SL200
1977	1.655	477	364	2.431	MAN SL200
1978	1.874	420	335	2.562	MAN SL200 MAN SG 220
1979	1.920	45	1.139	2.601	MAN SL200 MAN SG 220
1980	1.613	708	771	2.478	MAN SL200 MAN SG 220
1981	1.251	779	1.105	2.122	MAN SL200 MAN SG 220
1982	910	514	1.268	2.040	MAN SL200 MAN SG 220
1983	961	416	1.017	2.012	MAN SL200 MAN SG 220
1984	559	508	1.000	1.732	MAN SL200
1985	676	388	1.415	1.860	MAN SL200
1986	684	543	1.077	1.536	MAN SL200
1987					MAN SL200
1988					MAN SL200
1989					MAN NL202
1990					MAN NG272 MAN NL202
1991					MAN NG272 MAN NL202
1992					MAN NG272 MAN NL202 MAN NL262
2013	15.788				
2014	11.660				
Sum					

=== Engines ===
- Nuremberg (GER)

=== Axles and other components ===
- Munich (GER)
- Salzgitter (GER)

=== CKD-locations ===
- Shushary, Saint Petersburg, (RUS): Heavy-weight trucks. 50/50 Joint venture with Scania called Truck Production RUS LLC.
- Pinetown (RSA): heavy, medium and light trucks; bus-chassis for MAN & VW Truck & Bus
- Querétaro (MEX)
- Olifantsfontein (RSA): intercity- and regular service bus bodies for MAN & VW Truck & Bus
- Sharjah, (UAE): Assembling of trucks under the Shacman brand. The company is a part of the Shaanxi Automobile Group.
- East Jakarta, (IDN): Assembling of trucks and buses at a plant in Jatinegara, East Jakarta by PT. Duta Putera Sumatera.
- Shah Alam, (MYS): Assembling of Trucks and Buses
- Quezon City, (PHL): Assembling of Man and Volkswagen trucks and buses at MAN Truck and Bus Center assembly plant in Novaliches, Quezon City by MAN Automotive Concessionaires Corporation.
- Bangkok, (THA): Assembling of trucks and buses in Thailand by MAN Commercial Vehicle (Thailand) Co., Ltd.
- Samarkand, (UZB): Assembling of two trucks in Uzbekistan by MAN Auto-Uzbekistan.

== See also ==
- Büssing
- Neoplan
- MAN SE
- Volkswagen Caminhões e Ônibus
- Scania AB
- Traton
