= MAN NL202 =

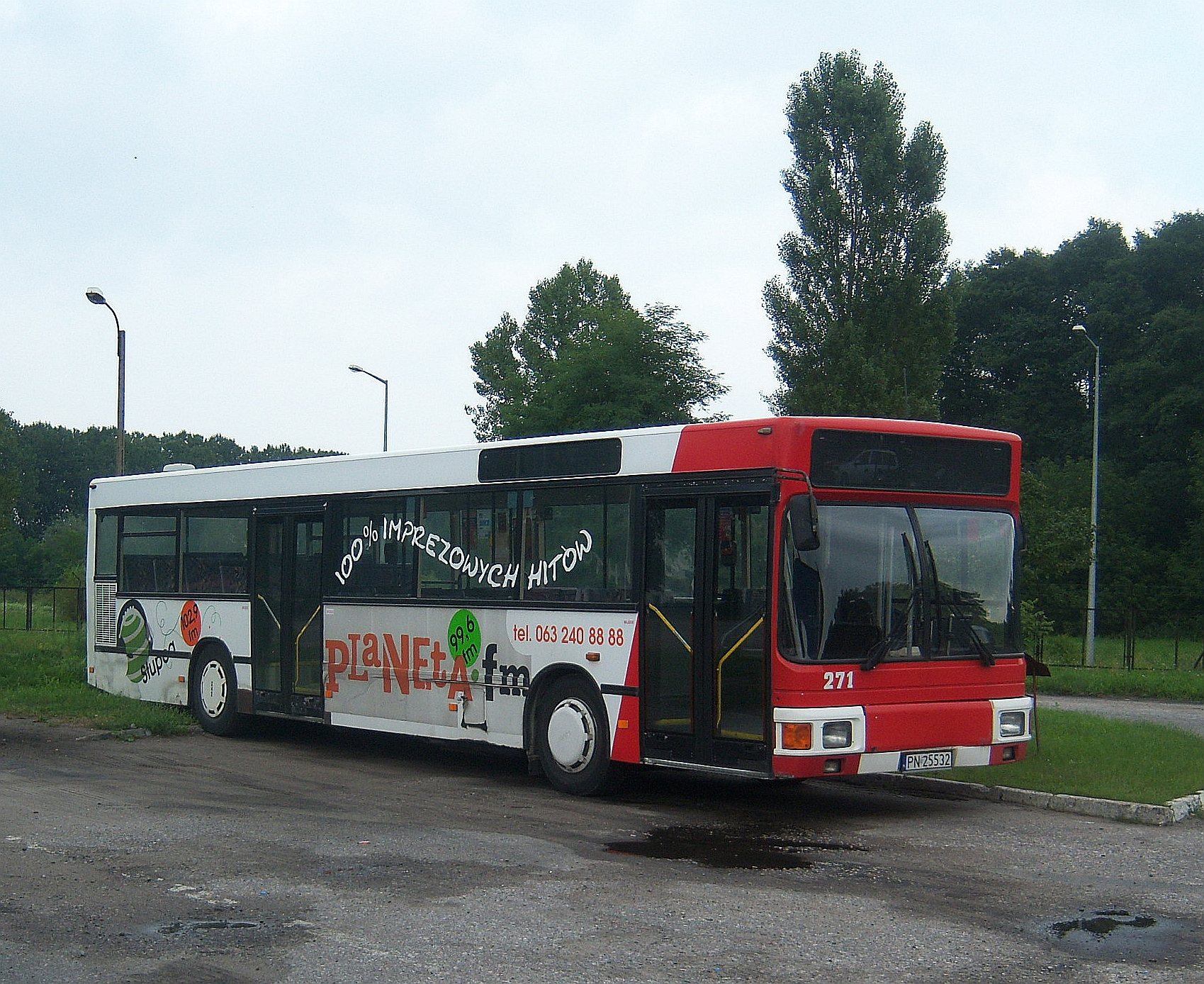

Overview
- Manufacturer: MAN Nutzfahrzeuge AG
- Production: 1989–1992
- Assembly: Munich, Germany; Sady, Poland

Body and chassis
- Class: Integral bus
- Body style: Full-size single-decker bus
- Doors: 2 or 3
- Floor type: Low-floor
- Related: Mercedes-Benz O405N

Powertrain
- Engine: MAN D0826LUH03: Diesel (turbocharged): 6.9 L MAN D0826LUH03 I6; Compressed natural gas: 12.0 L MAN E2866LUH I6
- Transmission: Voith D851.3 ZF 4HP500, ZF 5HP500

Dimensions
- Length: 11.675 m
- Width: 2.5 m
- Height: 2.782 m

Chronology
- Predecessor: MAN SL202
- Successor: MAN NL262

The MAN NL202 was a low floor single-decker bus built by MAN Nutzfahrzeuge from the late 1980s until 1992. It is derived from the VöV SL-II bus standard. Especially sold in Europe, in particular in Germany, it was replaced by MAN NL262. It was additionally sold in South Australia, in diesel and Compressed natural gas variants, the latter of which continues to be used to this day in significant numbers.

It has used a fully low floor configuration inside the bus with seats mounted on platforms similar to the MAN NL262 and the Mercedes-Benz O405N.

== See also ==
- Mercedes-Benz O405N
- MAN NG272
