= MAN F2000 =

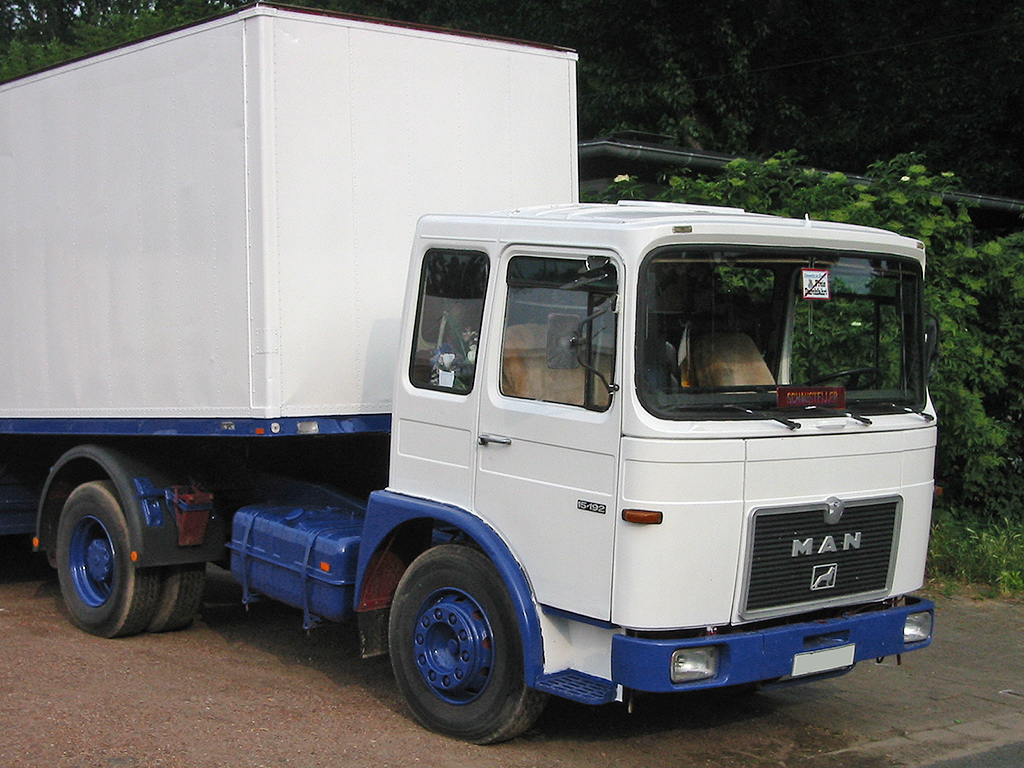
- The MAN F8 which served as the basis for the Saviem SM

Overview
- Also called: MAN F8 (1968–1986); MAN F90 (1986–1994); MAN F2000 (1994–1998); MAN E2000 (c. 1995–2003); MAN F2000 Evo (1998–2005); MAN FE-A (2000–2003) (Europe)
- Production: 1968–2002 (Germany); 2002–2003 (Austria); 1998–2005 (South Africa)
- Assembly: Germany: Munich; Austria: Vienna; South Africa: Pinetown

Body and chassis
- Layout: Longitudinal front
- Related: Saviem SM; Steyr NSK (MAN F2000)

Powertrain
- Engine: Inline six
- Transmission: 16-speed manual

Dimensions
- Wheelbase: 2,600–5,700 mm (102–224 in)
- Length: 2,205 mm (87 in)
- Height: 2,170 mm (85 in)

Chronology
- Successor: MAN TGX; MAN TGS

The MAN F Series was a range of trucks produced by MAN from 1967 to 2000. It was voted International Truck of the Year in 1987. It was also produced in a short version, the M90.

Saviem, with whom MAN maintained a technical and sales partnership from 1967 to 1977, supplied the cabs. In France, this cab design was fitted to the Saviem SM Europe trucks before MAN adopted it in Germany.
