= MAN NL262 =

MAN NL262 (A27)
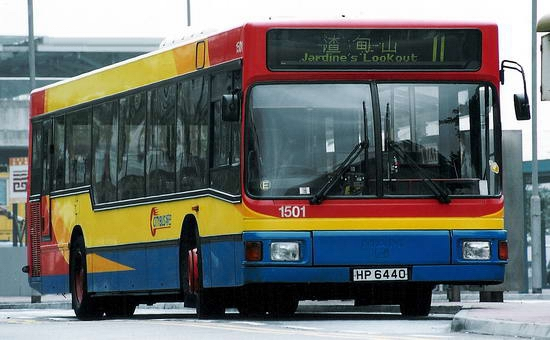
- MAN NL262 in service with Citybus registered HP6440 on Service 11.

Overview
- Manufacturer: MAN
- Production: 1992–1998
- Assembly: Munich, Germany

Body and chassis
- Doors: 1 or 2 (Hong Kong); 1 to 3 (mainland Europe)
- Floor type: Low-floor
- Related: MAN NL202

Powertrain
- Engine: MAN D2866LUH-22 (Euro II)
- Transmission: Voith or ZF

Dimensions
- Length: 11,697 mm (38 ft 4.5 in)
- Width: 2,500 mm (8 ft 2 in)
- Height: 3,004 mm (9 ft 10.3 in)

Chronology
- Predecessor: MAN NL202
- Successor: MAN Lion's City

MAN NL262 (A27) is a low-floor single-decker bus made by MAN from 1992 to 1998. Although predominantly produced for Hong Kong in right-hand drive operated by Citybus, some were made in left-hand drive for the mainland European market. It was succeeded by the MAN Lion's City.

== Operations ==
=== Hong Kong ===
Citybus was the only operator to acquire new NL262s in Hong Kong. In all, 85 NL262s in total were ordered. In 2000, five buses were sold to Discovery Bay Transportation Services. All of the buses were retired in 2015 and replaced by Youngman JNP6105GR and BYD K9R buses.

The MAN NLxx3F model is considered to be the spiritual successor.
