= MAN CLA =

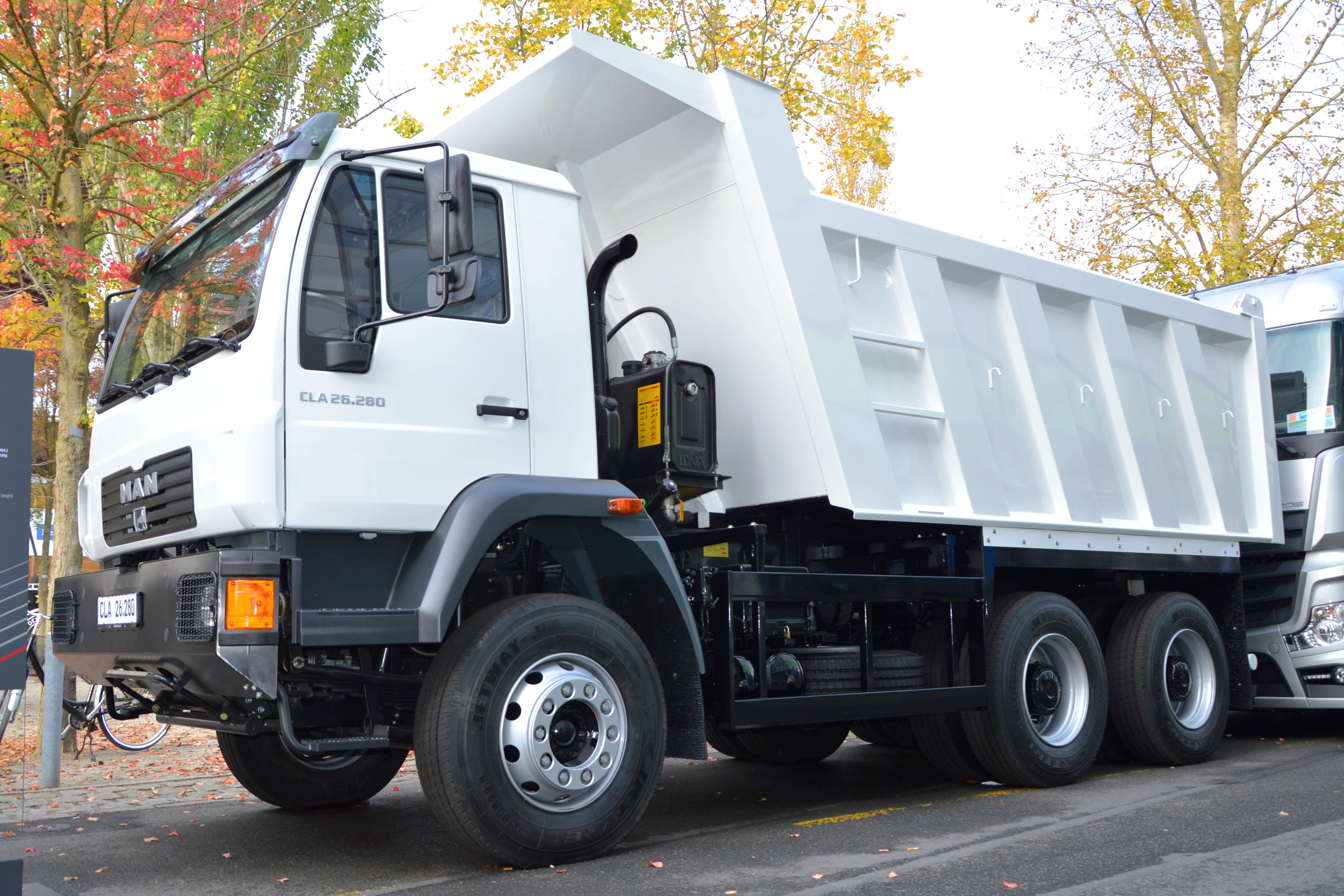

Overview
- Manufacturer: MAN Truck & Bus
- Production: 2007–present
- Assembly: India: Pune (MAN Force Trucks Pvt. Ltd); Indonesia: East Jakarta (CKD); Malaysia: Rawang (CKD); Philippines: Quezon City (CKD); South Africa: Pinetown (CKD); Thailand: Bangkok (CKD); Uzbekistan: Samarkand (CKD)

Body and chassis
- Class: Commercial vehicle
- Body style: Forward control

Powertrain
- Engine: D0836 6,871 cc (419.3 cu in) I6
- Power output: 220-300
- Transmission: 6-speed manual; 9-speed manual

The MAN CLA (Cargo Line Asia) is a medium and heavy-duty truck manufactured by MAN SE a Munich based truck manufacturer owned by Volkswagen group. The CLA was manufactured by MAN Truck & Bus India under the joint venture MAN Force Trucks Pvt. Ltd, owned by MAN SE and Force Motors, a Pune based automotive group.

The CLA is based on the MAN LE series, the production of the truck started in 2007 in India and was exported to other Asian countries as a CKD unit.

== History ==
The truck was developed specifically for the developing markets of Asia as a joint venture between MAN SE and Force motors at Pithampur Plant. CLA had a cab design derived from the global model LE2000/LE series and powered by a MAN D0836 common rail engine capable of outputs from 220 to 300hp, supported by a six and nine speed ZF manual transmission.

The truck was available in 20 plus variants including rigid trucks, tippers and tractors in 4x2 and 6x4 configurations with MAN AP axles and Meritor hypoid axles for heavy-duty units.

== CLA EVO ==
On 2016 Bauma Conexpo India MAN Trucks India launched EVO series of their 6x4 CLA dump truck and tractor head marking completion of 10 years of presence in India. The trucks were powered by the common rail MAN D-0836 engine complying (BSIV) bharat stage emission standards producing 300hp supported by 9 speed manual gearbox. On the exterior the trucks had new colors like white and blue with redesigned bumper featuring twin head lamps and day time running lamps (DRL).

== CLA Bus ==
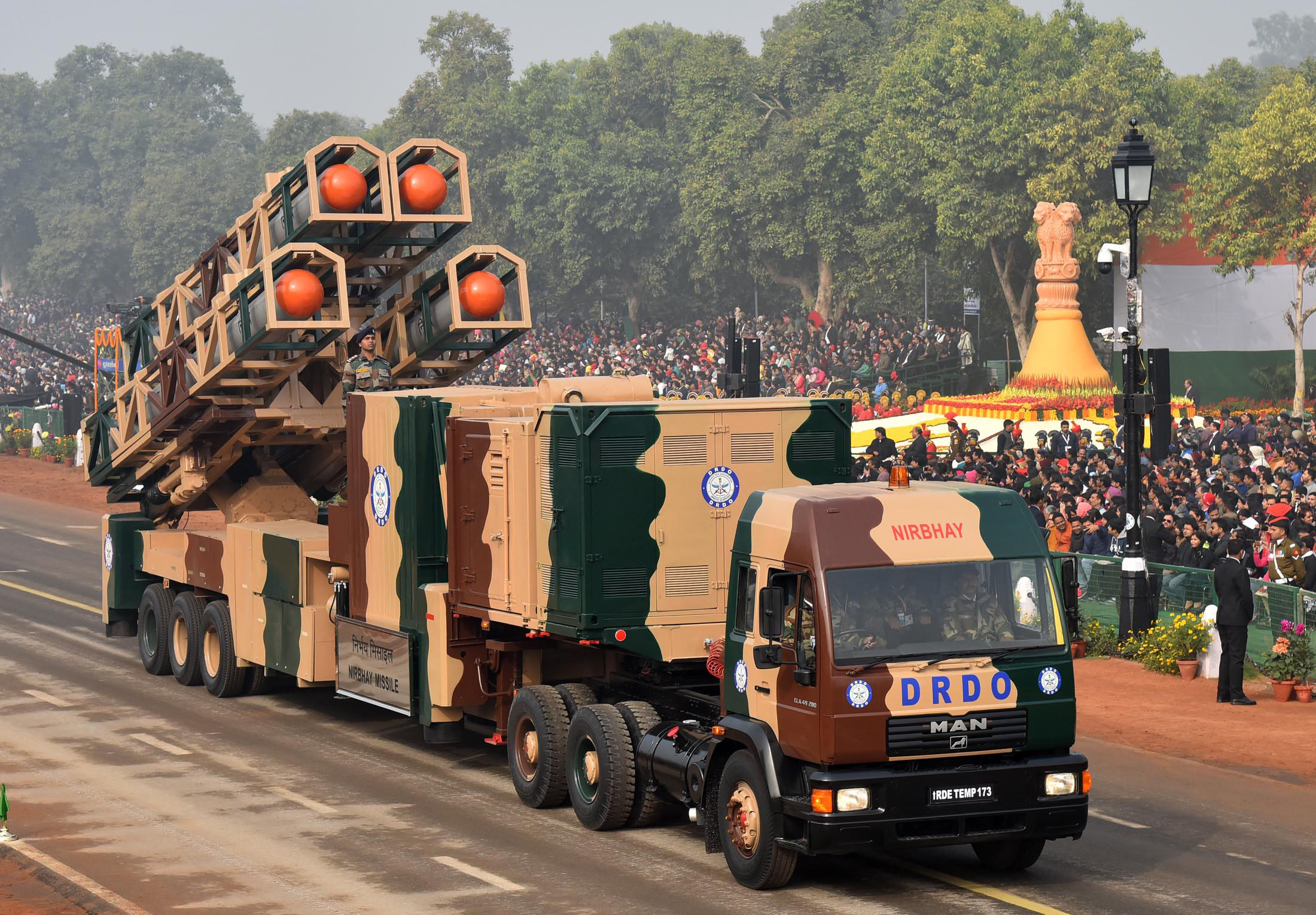
MAN CLA 49.280 towing Nirbhay cruise missile system on 2018 Republic Day Parade in Delhi, India.

MAN Trucks India launched CLA bus chassis in the beginning of 2018 power by front mounted MAN D-0836 engine with power output of 250hp and 300hp coupled with 6-speed ZF manual gearbox. The chassis was fully Bharat stage emission standards level four (BSIV) compliant with anti-lock braking system for safety as MAN designed it specifically for intercity application. Two variants were available 18.250 with 4x2 configuration and 22.300 with 6x4 configuration. MAN also teamed up with top three bus body builders in India which would provide preferred design to fleet operators.

== India Exit ==
In August 2018 just after month of launching CLA bus chassis in India MAN Trucks India planned the exist as a global restructuring by MAN Truck & Bus AG. Due to the exit all CLA trucks and buses manufacturing, sales, and exports was called off. MAN trucks dealers all over India took the matter to courts to get compensation for their investment in dealership infrastructure.

== See also ==
- Force Motors
- MAN SE
- Škoda Auto Volkswagen India
- BharatBenz
