= Håkan Samuelsson =

Swedish businessman (born 1951)

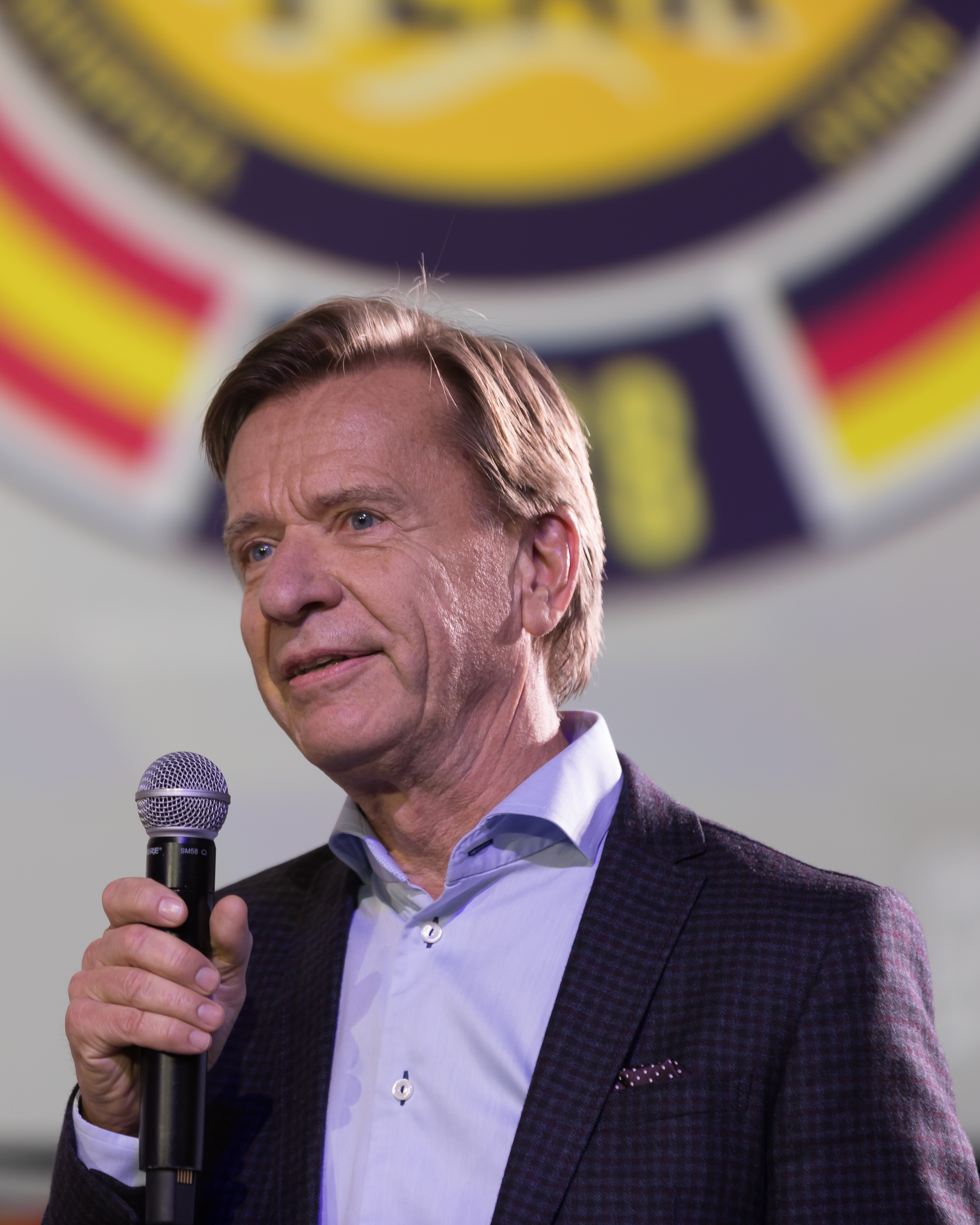
- Samuelsson in 2018
- Born: 19 March 1951 (age 75); Motala, Sweden
- Employer: Polestar

Håkan Samuelsson (born 19 March 1951) is a Swedish businessman who is chairman of the executive board (CEO) of Volvo Cars Corporation AB from October 2012 to January 2022. Previously, he was CEO of MAN SE from January 2005 to November 2009.

== Education ==
Samuelsson began studying at the Royal Institute of Technology in Stockholm in 1972, obtaining a degree in mechanical engineering (M.Sc.M.E.).

== Career ==
In 1977 Samuelsson joined Scania AB, Södertälje, Sweden, in the field of braking systems design. He subsequently held various technical management positions, becoming director of Powertrain in 1988. In 1993 he took over as technical director of Scania Latin America and in 1996 was appointed to the executive board of Scania AB, with responsibility for development and production.

In July 2000 he was appointed chairman of the executive board of MAN Nutzfahrzeuge AG and also a member of the executive board of MAN Aktiengesellschaft, both Munich.

Samuelsson was appointed chairman of the executive board of MAN in January 2005, a position he held until resigning on 24 November 2009.

Samuelsson was also Board Chair of Polestar, a Swedish automotive manufacturer. On 18 June 2024 Polestar announced Winfried Vahland is to be appointed Board Chair, as Samuelsson is to retire.

On 30 March 2025, Volvo Cars announced the reappointment of Håkan Samuelsson as CEO, succeeding Jim Rowan, who will step down on 31 March. Samuelsson, who previously led the company from 2012 to 2022, will serve a two-year term while Volvo searches for a long-term successor. This leadership change follows Volvo's recent warning of a challenging and competitive year ahead.
