= MAN Lion's City =

German public transit buses

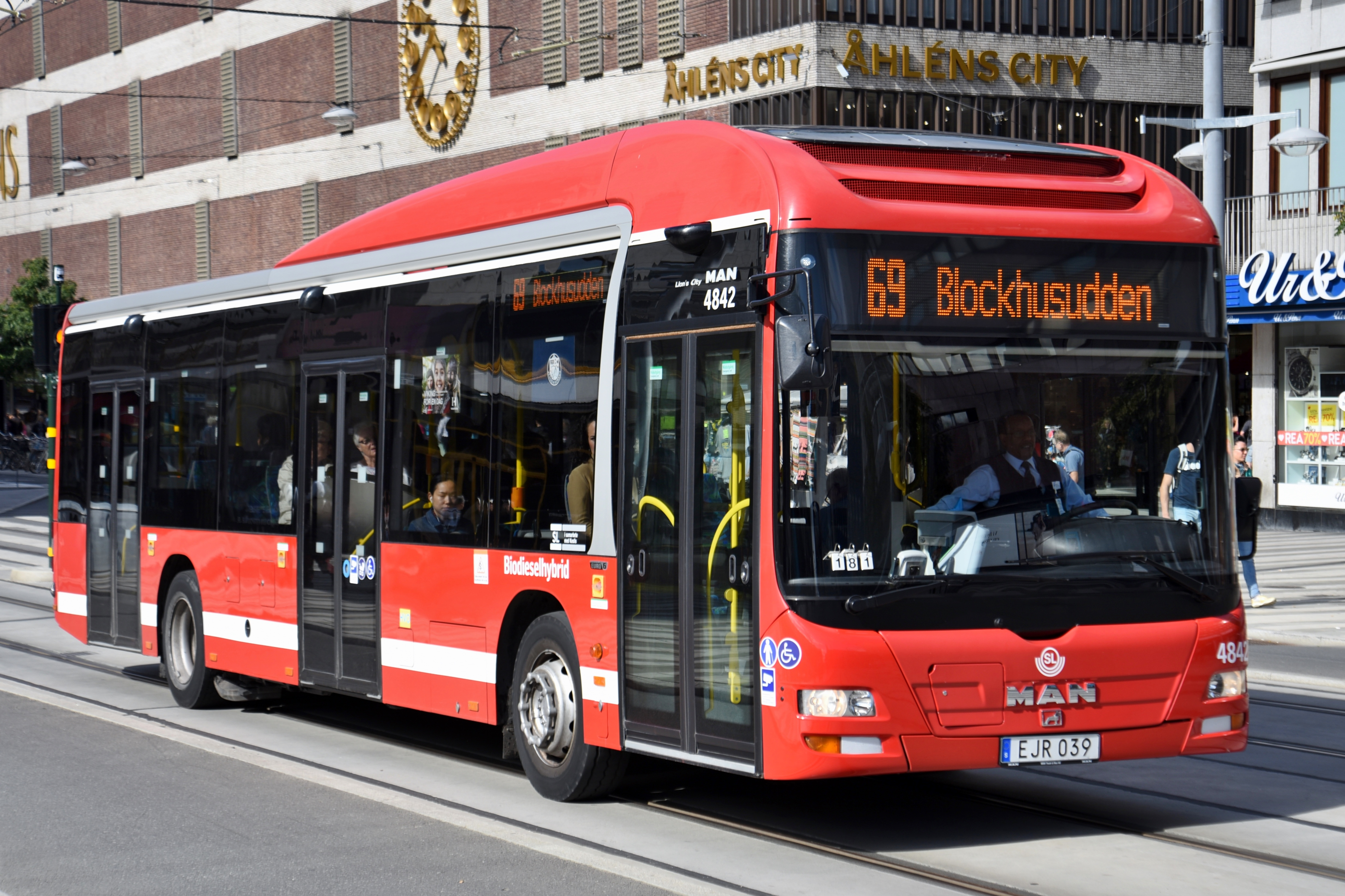
- Lion's City Hybrid in service in Sweden

Overview
- Manufacturer: MAN Truck & Bus
- Production: 1996–present
- Assembly: Germany: Augsburg/Nobitz (Göppel Bus), Plauen/Pilsting (Neoplan/Viseon Bus), Salzgitter; Poland: Starachowice/Sady (MAN Bus); South Africa: Olifantsfontein; Turkey: Ankara (MANAŞ); Malaysia: Johor (Gemilang Coachworks); Philippines: Carmona (Almazora)

Body and chassis
- Class: Integral bus
- Body style: Midibus; Single-decker bus; Articulated bus; Double-decker bus
- Doors: 1, 2, 3, 4 or 5
- Floor type: Low floor; Low entry
- Related: MAN Lion's Classic; Neoplan Centroliner

Powertrain
- Power output: 220–360 hp (160–270 kW)

Dimensions
- Length: 8.13–20.45 metres (26.7–67.1 ft)
- Width: 2.38–2.55 metres (7 ft 10 in – 8 ft 4 in)
- Height: 2.99–4.37 metres (9 ft 10 in – 14 ft 4 in)

Chronology
- Predecessor: MAN EL xx2 (A12); MAN ND xx2 (A14); MAN NG xx2 (A11); MAN NL xx2 (A10/A15/A27); MAN NM xx2 (469)

The MAN Lion's City is a range of low-floor and low-entry public buses built by German truck and bus manufacturer MAN Truck & Bus (previously MAN Nutzfahrzeuge) since 1996 primarily for the European market, but is also available in chassis-only variants worldwide. The name Lion's City has been used since 2006, when MAN's public bus models which had been marketed separately were gathered into one range, when also most models received a facelift. The first models to be introduced were the 12-metre low-floor intercity bus NÜ xx3 (A20) in 1996, the 12-metre city bus NL xx3 (A21) in 1997 and the articulated NG xx3 (A23) in 1998. As with former MAN bus models the power-rating made up part of the model name, giving the NÜ-series buses with power-ratings of 260 and 310 hp model names NÜ 263 and NÜ 313 respectively. The main production sites are in Starachowice and Sady in Poland, but the models have also been built in Germany, Turkey and Malaysia. Initially most of the midibus variants were manufactured by Göppel Bus in Augsburg, later Nobitz.

Models are available with a 6-cylinder turbocharged straight engine which runs on diesel, compressed natural gas or liquefied petroleum gas. Versions with hydrogen fuel cell drive and with hydrogen internal combustion engines have been successfully tested, as well as diesel-electric hybrid drive. A production hybrid-electric version, the Lion's City Hybrid, which uses supercapacitors and two 67 kW electric motors is available since 2010. Hybrid electric buses offer increased efficiency in urban traffic and use 30% less fuel than combustion-only buses.

The latest generation of Neoplan Centroliner is based on the Lion's City (Neoplan was also part of the Neoman Bus group).

== Integral variants ==
Codes inside parentheses are internal codes that identify some technical characteristics of the variants, like length/wheelbase, number of axles, floor height, width, engine arrangement and so on. Some codes are unique to one variant, while others are shared between variants. Some variants have changed from one code to another over time. These codes are sometimes mistakenly used as a model designation. One can find the codes in VINs (i.e. WMAA21...) and in vehicle production serial numbers (i.e. A210012).

=== Current ===
City (low-floor)

- Lion's City 12, 12 m single-decker diesel
- Lion's City 12 G, 12 m single-decker CNG
- Lion's City 12 E, 12 m single-decker electric
- Lion's City 18, 18 m articulated diesel
- Lion's City 18 G, 18 m articulated CNG
- Lion's City 18 E, 18 m articulated electric
- Lion's City, known as NL xx3 1997–2004 – 12 m single-decker
  - horizontal engine (A21)
  - vertical engine (A37), since 2002
- Lion's City Hybrid (A37) – 12 m hybrid single-decker
- Lion's City C (A26, A36 since 2013) – 13.7 m single-decker
- Lion's City L (A26), known as NL xx3 - 15 m 1998–2004, Lion's City LL 2004–2009 – 14.7 m single-decker
- Lion's City G (A23), known as NG xx3 1998–2004 – 18 m articulated
- Lion's City GL (A23, A40 since 2011) – 18.75 m articulated
- Lion's City M – 10.5 m midibus
  - 2.38 m wide (A35)
  - 2.5 m wide (A47)

City (low-entry)

- Lion's City LE (A78), known as EL xx3 2003–2004, Lion's City T 2004–2008 – 12m single-decker
  - version based on standard low-floor, horizontal engine platform (A21), including CNG version, available since 2011(?)
  - version for South African market – bodied on 18.280 HOCL-NL/R (A84) chassis by MAN South Africa in Olifantsfontein since 2011
- Lion's City C LE (A26, A45 since 2013?) – 13.7 m single-decker
- Lion's City L LE (A26, A44 since 2012?) – 14.7 m single-decker
- Lion's City G LE (A42) – 18 m articulated
- Lion's City GL LE (A49) – 18.75 m articulated

Intercity (low-floor)

- Lion's City Ü (A20), known as NÜ xx3 1996–2004 – 12m single-decker

Intercity (low-entry)

- Lion's City LE Ü (A78), known as EL xx3 2003–2004, Lion's City TÜ 2004–2008 – 12m single-decker

=== Discontinued ===
City (low-floor)

- Lion's City DD (A39) – 13.73 m double-decker
- Lion's City GXL (A43) – 20.45 m articulated
- Lion's City M, known as NM xx3 and EM xx3 until 2005 – 8.13 m to 11.21 m midibus, bodied on 10/11.xxx HOCL (469), 12.xxx HOCL-NL (A76), 14.xxx HOCL-NL (A66) and MAN NLxx3F (A22) chassis by Göppel Bus

Intercity (low-floor)

- Lion's City ÜLL (A25), known as NÜ xx3 - 15 m 1998–2004 – 14.7 m single decker

== Type designation system ==
The type designations were used to define all models prior to 2004. With the introduction of the model names in 2004, the system is still in use on all vehicles, but is more for internal use. In most cases it can be found on the plate inside the bus where one finds the VIN.

Floor height

- N: Low-floor bus (German: Niederflur)
- E: Low-entry bus (Some low-entry versions have letter N instead when they are built technically similar to the low-floor version.)

Adaption

- L: Rigid bus (no special adaption) (German: Linienbus)
- D: Double-decker bus (German: Doppeldeckerbus)
- G: Articulated bus (German: Gelenkbus)
- M: Midibus
- Ü: Intercity bus (German: Überlandbus)

Power code

- xx: First two digits of power output in hp (nearest ten)
- 3: third generation
- F: Denotes that it is built as a chassis for external bodywork (German: Fahrgestell)

For example, an ND323F low-floor double-decker bus has a power output of 320 hp.

== Chassis variants (for external bodywork) ==
Low-floor chassis variants are offered for external bodywork by local bodywork manufacturers. Most are bodied in the local manufacturer's own styling, but some are licensed to replicate the Lion's City bodywork, usually in markets where MAN do not sell the integral variants. This includes the East Lancs Kinetec for the UK market, which only replicate the front part and Gemilang Coachworks's version of the Lion's City, replicating the whole LHD bodywork for their (usually RHD) buses sold in Asia Pacific market, including the Lion's City Hybrid bodywork mounted on conventional diesel chassis.

- NLxx3F (A22) – single-decker bus, horizontal engine, 10.5 m – 12.0 m
- NDxx3F (A34/A48/A95) – double-decker bus, 10.85 m – 12.8 m. They have only been built in relatively small numbers and only for right-hand drive markets.
- NGxx3F (A24) – articulated bus, horizontal engine, 18.0 m – 18.75 m
- NMxx3F (A35) – midibus, vertical engine, 9.7 m – 10.4 m

== Single decker ==
=== MAN NLxx3F and 14.2xx HOCL-NL (A66) ===
MAN NLxx3F and 14.2xx HOCL-NL (A66)
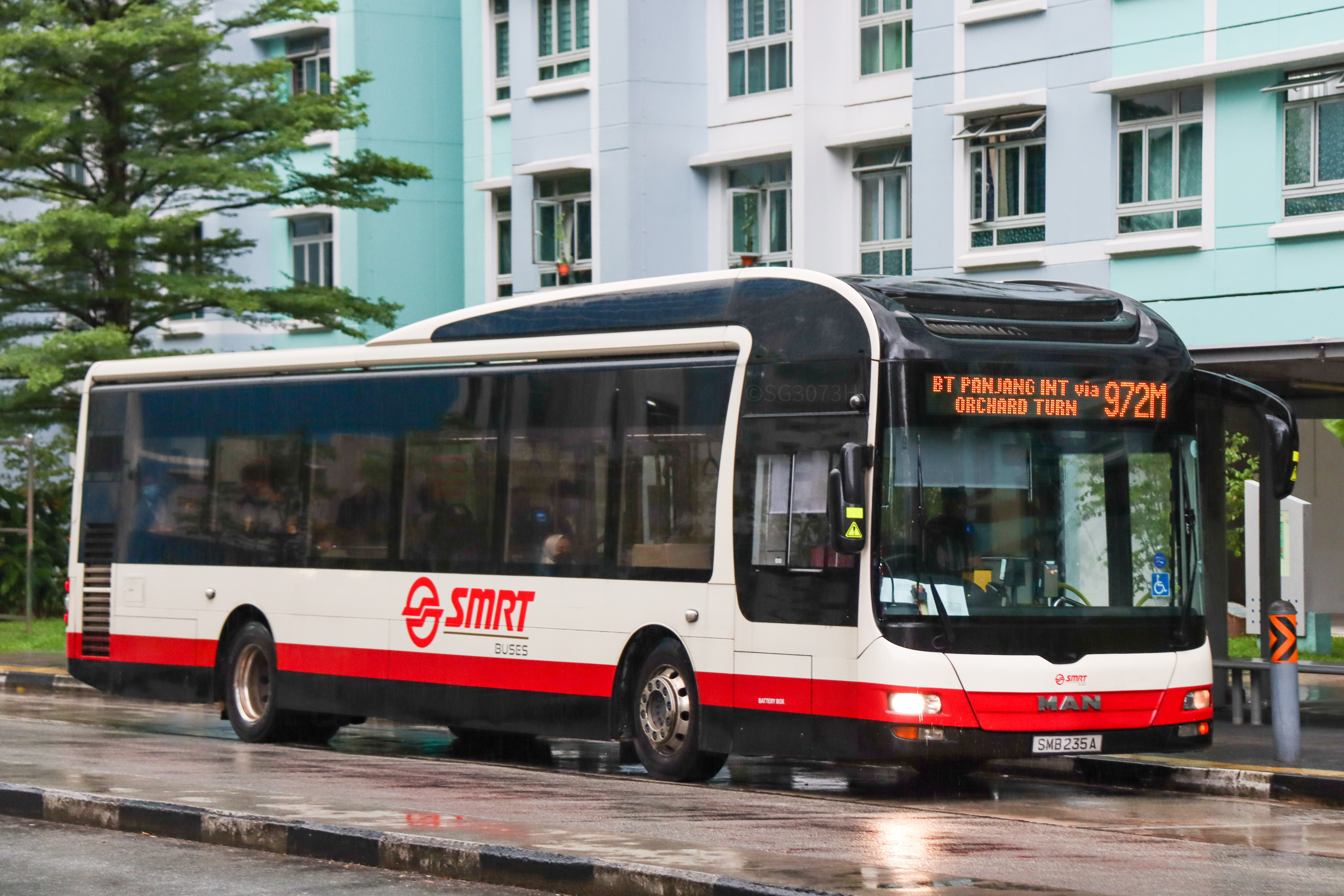

Overview
- Manufacturer: MAN
- Production: 1998–present
- Assembly: Munich, Germany (Integral) & Johor, Malaysia (Gemilang Coachworks)

Body and chassis
- Class: Bus chassis
- Body style: Single-decker bus
- Doors: 1 – 3
- Floor type: Low floor/Low entry
- Related: MAN NLxx3 Lion's City (A21)

Powertrain
- Engine: A22 (Euro V): MAN D 2066 LUH-32 (NL323F); A22 (Euro VI): MAN D 2066 LUH-51 (NL323F); A66: MAN D 0836 (14.250 HOCL-NL); A22 (CNG): MAN E2876LUH (CNG)
- Electric motor: A22 (Retrofitted Electric): Danfoss Editron EM-PMI375-T800-1600 (NL323F)
- Power output: 220–320 hp
- Transmission: Voith DIWA; ZF Ecomat; ZF EcoLife; Linkker LinkDrive
- Battery: A22 (Retrofitted Electric): Lithium Iron Phosphate batteries (LFP) (177.5 kWh)
- Electric range: A22 (Retrofitted Electric): Up to 130 km
- Plug-in charging: A22 (Retrofitted Electric): Opportunity Charging via Overhead Pantograph; A22 (Retrofitted Electric): CCS2 Plug In

Dimensions
- Wheelbase: 5875 mm
- Length: 10.3 m - 12.0 m (bodied)
- Width: 2.50 – 2.55m
- Height: 3.34m

Chronology
- Predecessor: MAN NLxx2F (898)

The MAN NLxx3F is a series of low-floor single-decker city bus chassis between 10 metre and 12 metre lengths, offered by MAN since 1998, with chassis code A22. They are based on the integral low-floor MAN NLxx3 Lion's City (A21). Available versions since launch include: NL223F, NL233F, NL243F, NL263F, NL273F, NL283F, NL313F, and NL323F. -Liquefied petroleum gas and Compressed natural gas versions are also available, with NL313F Compressed Natural Gas (CNG) being the most powerful. While the low entry rigid bus MAN 14.250 HOCL-NL (code A66) vehicles were powered by the MAN D0836 LOH-65 engine (Euro V emission standards) paired with ZF Ecomat 6HP 504C 6-speed automatic transmission and one unit will be receive a ZF Ecolife 6AP 1400B gearbox. newer Euro VI bus are new equipped with MAN D0836 LOH-81 engine, which is Euro 6 compliant and ZF Ecolife 6AP 1400C 6-speed automatic gearbox.

=== Europe ===
==== Spain ====
EMT Madrid of Madrid, Spain received a total of 84 CNG-powered NL313F CNGs in 2008. They were bodied by Castrosua and Burillo.

In 2011, five 10.4m NL283Fs and one Hispano Area-bodied NL283F began operating in Santiago de Compostela and Buñol respectively.

Between 2011 and 2012, 13 man NL283F buses came into operation in Tcc Pamplona, of which four were bodied by Sunsundegui and the other 9 by Castrosua.

In 2017, fifteen NL323F buses came into operation in EMT Malaga, all of them bodied by Castrosua

==== United Kingdom ====
Wrightbus initially developed a bodywork for the MAN NL273F, called the Wright Meridian. It was the first MAN chassis to be bodied by Wrightbus. A Meridian demonstrator was launched at the Coach & Bus Live 2007, which entered service with Whitelaws. Regal Busways, Newbury Buses and Diamond Bus North West each operate an handful of Wright Meridian-bodied NL273Fs across the United Kingdom.

==== North Macedonia ====
In 2020, Skopje's public bus company JSP Skopje received its order of 33 CNG operated buses. The order included 21 12m E1856 with a capacity for 85 passengers, and 12 18m E1856 with a capacity for 149 passengers. All the busses where EURO 6 compliant.

=== Asia-Pacific ===
==== Hong Kong ====
The 12.0 metre MAN NL323F buses was manufactured by Gemilang Coachworks of Malaysia. These MAN NL323F buses was introduction into service in 2010; operated by Discovery Bay of Hong Kong. Reused the bus design Scania KUB Gemilang bodies of Malaysia. However, the 10.3 metre MAN 14.250 HOCL-NL (code A66) buses with MAN Lion's City Hybrid bodywork manufactured and assembly by Gemilang Coachworks in Malaysia, under license by MAN. The power that is fitted with being compliant Euro 5 emission standards MAN D0836 LOH-65 diesel engine. The MAN 14.250 HOCL-NL (A66) bus have been deployed introduction passenger service in since January 2018. other example two Discovery Bay MAN NL323F (A22) (Euro 6) Buses with MAN Lion's City Hybrid Mark 2 Bodywork assembly in Malaysia later delivered to Hong Kong and deployment enter passenger service from 2018. the units of MAN single-decker bus was franchised bus companies Park Island, Discovery Bay Transit Services. each single-door configuration MAN NL323F was produced by Ocean Park.

==== South Korea ====
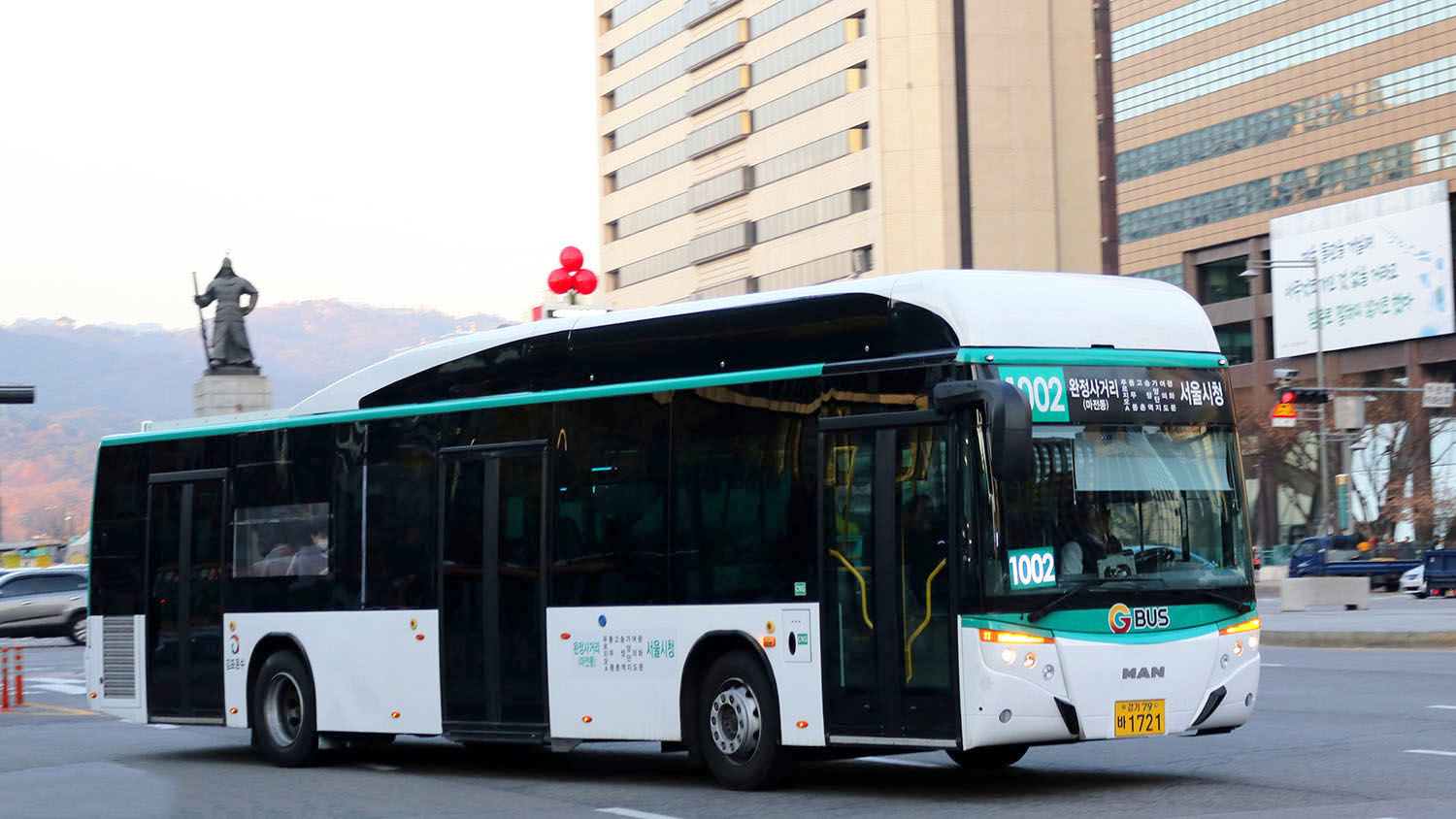
MAN NL313F with Castrosua City Versus bodywork operated by Gimpo Trans Co. in South Korea

In March 2017, MAN exhibited a 12.0m Castrosua City Versus bodied MAN NL313F CNG concept bus with three doors at the 11th Seoul Motor Show. It was marketed as the MAN Lion's City CNG, despite featuring Castrosua bodywork, which has a different design with the integral MAN Lion's City's body.

Gimpo Trans Co. received the first delivery of NL313F CNG and began service on Gimpo City bus route 1002 in November 2017.

=== Australia ===
At Brisbane Airport, Carbridge operates one imported and rebodied Gemilang Coachworks MAN NL323F from Singapore which was a demonstrator unit as SMB138Y for SMRT Buses with the MCV Evolution bodywork. This unit was displayed at the 2015 BusVic Maintenance Conference in Moonee Valley, Victoria.

=== Middle East ===
==== Israel ====
Dan Bus Company and Egged operate a fleet of NL313Fs and NL323Fs in Jerusalem, Tel Aviv and Haifa.

== Double decker ==
MAN ND313F / ND363F (A34) MAN ND243F / ND283F (A48) MAN ND323F / ND363F (A95)
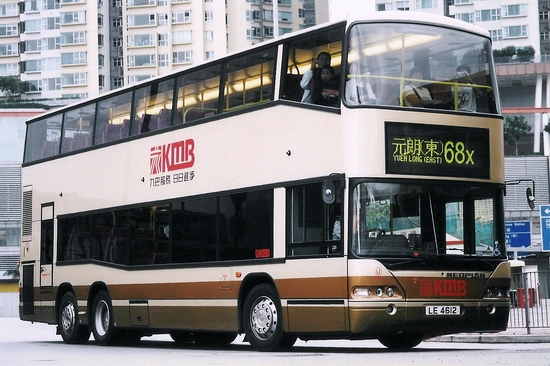
- KMB's ND313F with Neoplan Centroliner bodywork.

Overview
- Manufacturer: MAN
- Production: 2003–2006 (A34); 2006–2010 (A48); 2014–2025 (A95)

Body and chassis
- Class: Bus chassis
- Body style: Double-decker bus
- Doors: 1 - 3
- Floor type: Low floor
- Related: MAN NDxx3 Lion's City DD (A39)

Powertrain
- Engine: A34 (Euro III): MAN D 2866 LUH-24 (ND313F), D 2866 LUH-29 (ND363F); A48 (Euro IV): MAN D 0836 LOH-51 (ND283F); A95 (Euro V): MAN D 2066 LUH-32 (ND323F), D 2066 LUH-33 (ND363F); A95 (Euro VI): MAN D 2066 LUH-51 (ND323F)
- Power output: 240–360 hp (180–270 kW)
- Transmission: Voith DIWA; ZF EcoLife

Dimensions
- Length: 10.85 m (2-axle); 12.0 m, 12.8 m (tri-axles); 12.5 m (3-door MAN ND323F A95 only)
- Width: 2.55m
- Height: 4.1m, 4.2m, 4.3m, 4.4m

=== MAN ND313F / ND363F (A34) ===
The MAN ND313F and MAN ND363F, with the chassis code A34, is a tri-axle 12-metre chassis. A total number of 27 chassis were built between 2003 and 2006.

In 2003, Kowloon Motor Bus (KMB) of Hong Kong received one MAN ND313F with Neoplan Centroliner N4426 bodywork, it received fleet number APM1 and registration number LE4612, entering service later in the same year. The company later decided to choose other type of bus as the Centroliner bodywork cannot adapt Hong Kong climate, which lead to difficulties in repairing. This can be proven by their bus Neoplan Centroliner which they bought before. As a result, the bus remained unique in Kowloon Motor Bus fleet. It was retired in January 2019. Interestingly, this bus always need to stay in depot for repairing due to mechanical issues. Bus fans in Hong Kong therefore called her "Depot Officer" as nickname.

25 ND363F received Ayats coach bodywork, and were delivered to Ulsterbus of Northern Ireland in 2006.

=== MAN ND243F / ND283F (A48) ===
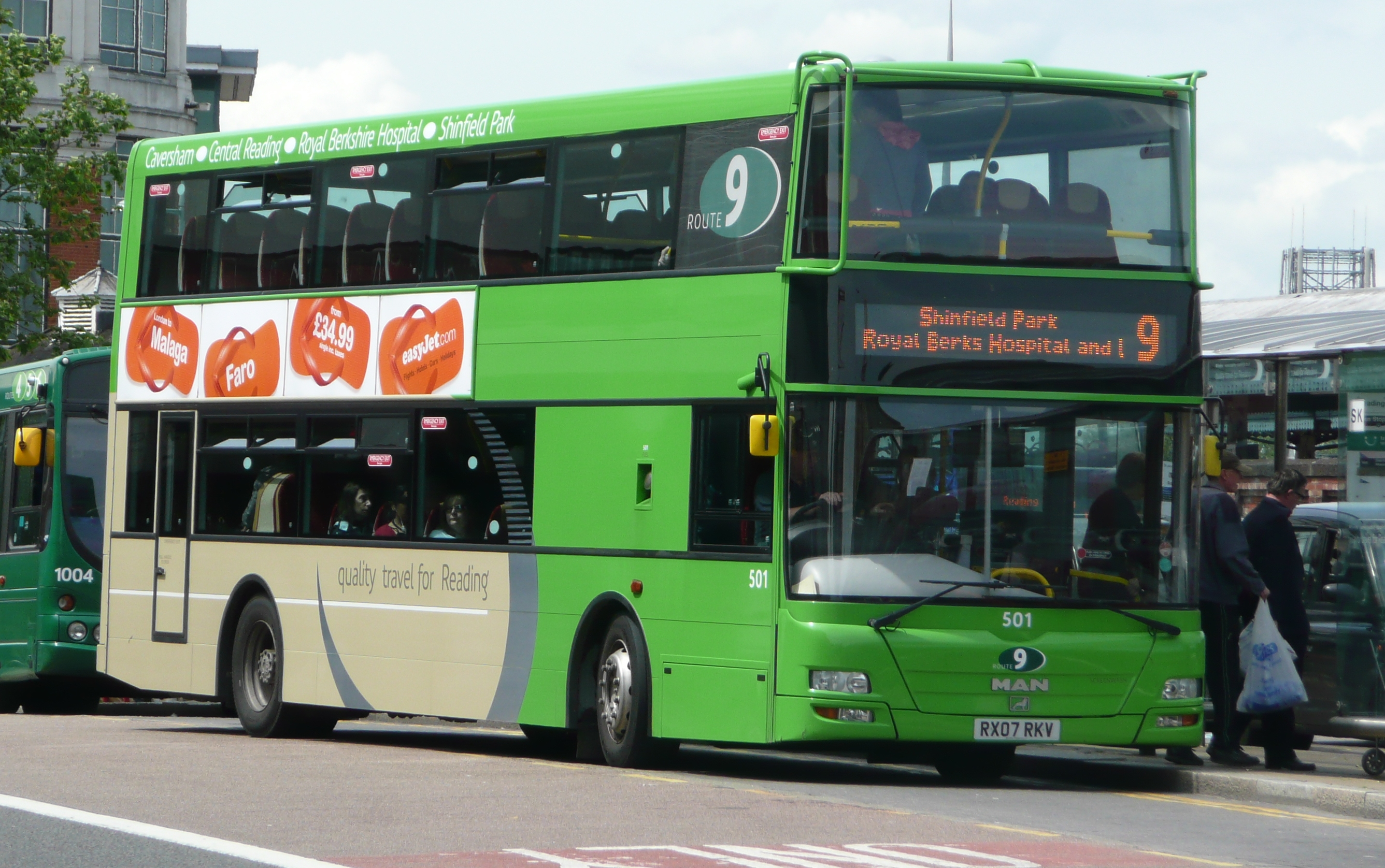
Reading Buses ND283F with East Lancs Kinetec+ bodywork

In 2006, a 10.85 metre two-axle version was launched as the MAN ND243F and MAN ND283F, with chassis code A48.

One ND283F received an East Lancs Kinetec+ bodywork, which had a front similar to that of MAN Lion's City. Thereafter, two more ND283F test chassis were built.

=== MAN ND323F / ND363F (A95) ===
In 2013, a new double deck chassis based on the NL323F A22 low floor single-deck chassis was launched as the MAN ND323F and MAN ND363F, with a new chassis code A95. Currently, the bodywork of all A95 buses are built by Gemilang Coachworks and are based on the licensed MAN Lion's City DD design, and is also marketed in various markets as the MAN Lion's City DD for the 12.0 m long variant and the MAN Lion's City DD L for the 12.8 m long variant. A concept bodywork design was unveiled in 2015, in the form of a 3-door bus built for Singapore's Land Transport Authority (LTA). Currently, a refreshed design based on the concept is being adopted on the newer buses. In addition, the Australian market buses feature a different rear end design as compared to those sold in other markets. All MAN A95 production buses were delivered between 2014 and 2025. At the end of a 17-year statutory lifespan, buses will be retired or have their lifespans extended. All buses fitted with ZF Ecolife 6AP 2000B 6-speed automatic gearbox and SG6029S equipped with a 4-speed automatic Voith DIWA 864.6 gearbox.

==== Singapore ====
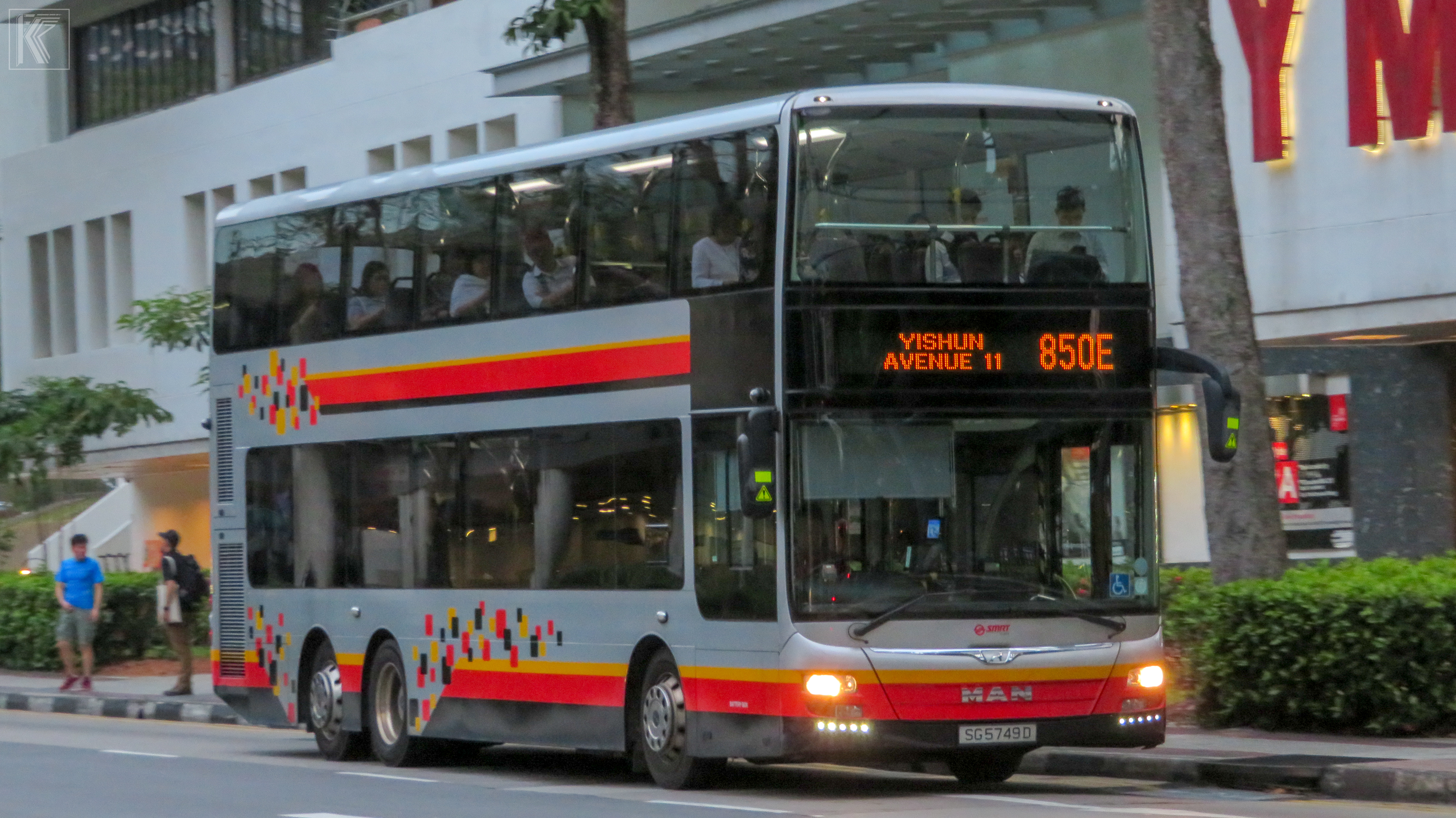
A MAN A95 as operated by SMRT Buses

In November 2014, SMRT Buses was given a single MAN A95 demonstrator (SMB5888H) for trial purposes at the manufacturer's request and the first MAN A95 RHD chassis to be built for global deployment. The bus is fitted with Ster NewCity seats made in Poland, and lower deck interior layout similar to the MAN A22 and A24 buses. Due to the Bus Contracting Model, SMB5888H was transferred to Tower Transit in 2021.

Following a successful trial run, SMRT Buses ordered 16 production batch MAN A95s which were delivered between August and November 2015 with tree guards pre-installed. In 2023, the first bus (SMB5897G) was repainted from SMRT pixel livery to LTA's Lush green livery.

In 2015, the Land Transport Authority ordered 60 units as part of the Bus Contracting Model (BCM) order. Largely similar to the previous batch procured by SMRT Buses, these buses had some minor differences in appearance such as the tree guards. The final 10 units were equipped with USB charging ports inside the interior. The first 15 buses were painted in SMRT's corporate pixelated livery, 11 buses had black paint in place of SMRT's logo. All of the rest featured LTA's lush green livery. All of these buses were registered between April & August 2016 and are currently assigned to SMRT Buses, Tower Transit and SBS Transit.

All the 77 production double-decker MAN A95 units were bearing the Gemilang Mark 1 bodywork.

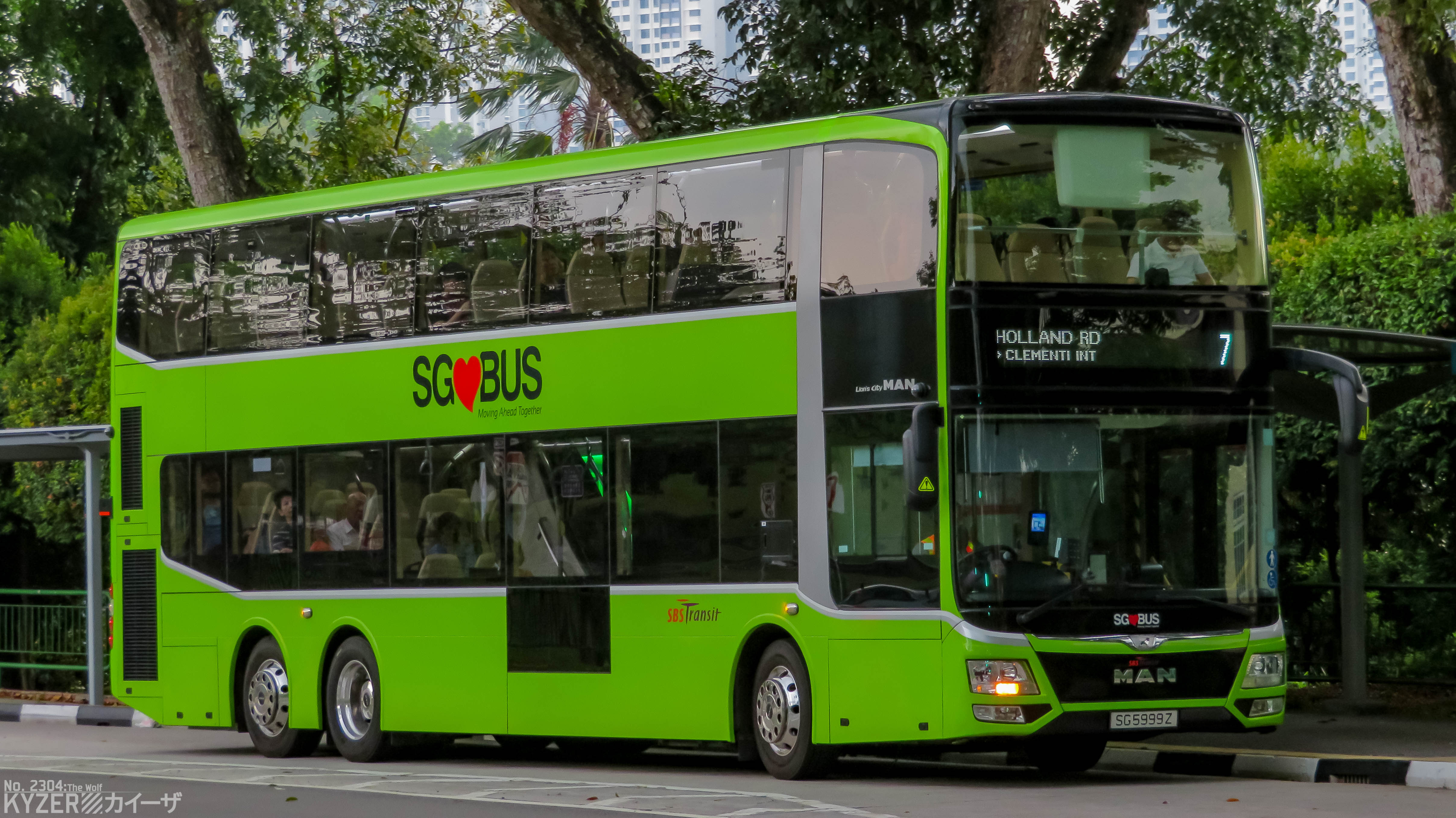
The three-door and two-staircase concept bus MAN A95 (Gemilang Mk2) demonstrator, which was introduced in 2015 and is currently operated by SBS Transit since 2018

Also in 2015, a 12.8 metre-long custom built MAN A95 with 3-door and 2-staircase was built for the Land Transport Authority, featuring an updated concept bodywork design. The concept bus was unveiled in 2016, which the first exhibited at Ngee Ann City in location at Orchard and equipped with an outward-swinging sliding plug door located at the front. Originally deployed by Tower Transit on bus 143/143M in 2017, it was transferred to SBS Transit in early 2018, operating on bus 7.

In September 2016, LTA ordered another 122 MAN A95s which were put into service in since 2017. These buses contain similar specifications with the previous batches but with an updated bodywork design, with the first Gemilang Mark 2 bodywork 30 units being based on the concept design likely the SG5999Z, and these 92 units will be rest with an updated bodywork design bearing the Mark 3. SG2017C its new features an equipped with Euro 6 MAN D 2066 LUH-51 engine (10,518cc), and Selective Catalytic Reduction (SCR) technology, required the exhaust fluids using the AdBlue. These buses were assigned to SBS Transit, SMRT Buses, Tower Transit and Go-Ahead, with most of the SMRT Buses-operated units replacing the Mercedes-Benz O405G articulated buses.

In November 2017, under a negotiated tender, the Land Transport Authority ordered 250 Euro 6 MAN buses, comprising 150 MAN A22s and 100 MAN A95s, equipped with MAN D 2066 LUH-51 engine (10,518cc) and minor differences to the bodywork in the previous batch. These buses were equipped with two wheelchair bays as compared to one in previous batches. An option was exercised in 2018 to procure an additional 150 MAN A95s in this batch. These buses entered revenue service in May 2018 and are currently assigned to SBS Transit, SMRT Buses, Tower Transit and Go-Ahead for fleet additions and replacement of retiring buses.

In July 2018, a tender was awarded by LTA to ST Kinetics for the procurement of 111 MAN A95, which were delivered with subtle differences as compared to the earlier batches. These buses entered service in March 2020, with the final bus delivered in October 2021. Similarities to the previous batches, these buses are currently assigned to SBS Transit and SMRT Buses for fleet additions and replacement of retiring buses.

Following the successful trial of the three-door and two-staircase MAN A95, the Land Transport Authority procured 50 production batch 3-door and 2-staircase A95 along with 50 production batch 3-door and 2-staircase Alexander Dennis Enviro500 MMC units. These buses entered service in January 2021 with SBS Transit, SMRT Buses, Tower Transit Singapore and Go-Ahead Singapore.

All of the Euro 6 production batch double-decker MAN A95s were built to LTA's specifications and bear the Mark 4 bodywork design. It was the successor of MAN A95 Mark 3 (Euro 5) buses, including initial Mark 3 batch (Euro 6) (SG2017C).

==== Hong Kong ====
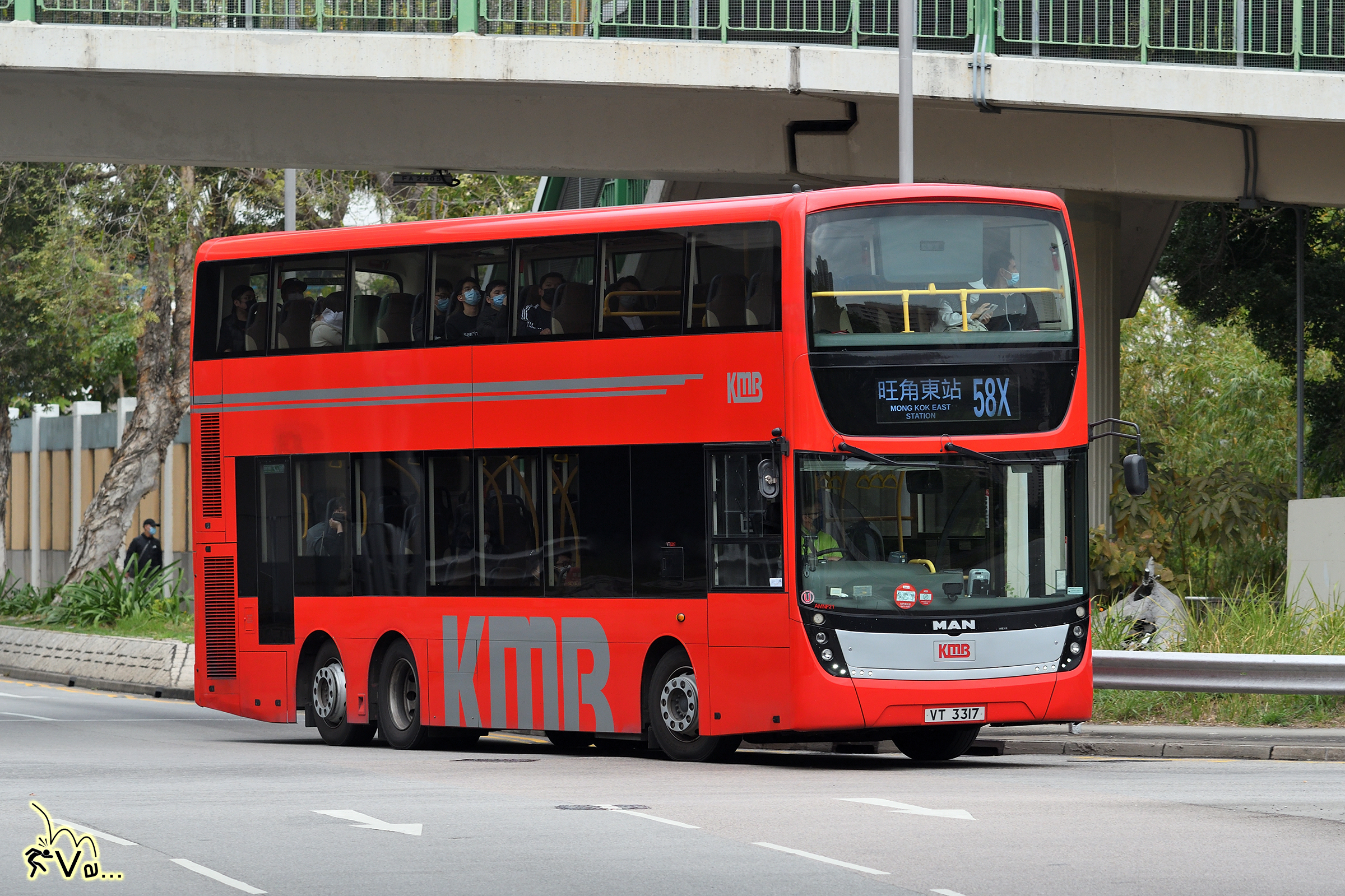
A Gemilang Coachwork Bodywork MAN A95 operated by KMB

In August 2014, Kwoon Chung Motors Company (KCM) ordered 9 ND323Fs replacing 8 Dennis Tridents and 1 MAN 24.310. Also, KCM's subsidiary company New Lantau Bus (NLB) purchased 10 ND323Fs. They were delivered to Hong Kong in June and August 2015 respectively. Moreover, in 2017, NLB purchased 16 ND363Fs with Gemilang Lion's city DD facelift body, they were delivered to Hong Kong since November 2017 and registered since February 2018. The order has been increased to add another 13 vehicles and registered since June 2018. In 2018, NLB purchased 5 ND363Fs with Gemilang's Lion's city DD facelift body which is equivalent to the previous order and equipped with MAN D 2066 LUH-51 engine. They are being delivered to Hong Kong since February 2019.

In May 2015, an ND363F was delivered to Kowloon Motor Bus (KMB) of Hong Kong and was first used during August 2015. In October 2015, KMB placed an order for 20 ND323Fs with Gemilang Lion's City DD body. In 2017, KMB ordered one ND323F with Gemilang self-build body and equipped with Navaho LCD.

New World First Bus also ordered a 12.8m long ND323F A95.

New China Lane Travel, To Yo Travel and Goldspark Hong Kong Tours have also ordered ND323F A95s in open top form.

Discovery Bay Transit Services (DBTSL) from Discovery Bay placed an order of four ND323F A95s in 2016 and delivered in June 2017. They were registered in late June and mid-July 2017. In 2019, DBTSL ordered two ND323F A95s equipped with MAN D 2066 LUH-51 engine and delivered in January and February 2020. Two new buses were registered and operated in July 2020.

HZMB bus operator has ordered 20 ND363Fs with 4.2m height variant and delivered in 2018. In 2019, HZMB bus operator has ordered 40 ND323Fs with 4.2m height variant and MAN D 2066 LUH-51 engine. These buses are delivered since April 2019.

==== Australia ====
In 2017, State Transit purchased 41 Gemilang Coachworks bodied MAN A95s for its Sydney B-Line service. In 2019,Forest Coach Lines purchased 6 Gemilang Coachworks bodied MAN A95s.

==== United Arab Emirates ====
In 2019, RTA (Dubai) ordered 70 Gemilang bodied MAN A95s. This is the first order of the A95 in left-hand drive configuration.

== Articulated ==
=== MAN NG363F (A24) ===
The MAN NG363F, with the chassis code A24, is a tri-axle 17.98 m (59 ft) chassis. It is a low-floor articulated city bus with similarities to the diesel powertrain in the rigid bus MAN NL323F (A22) and double-decker bus MAN ND323F (A95). The engine and automatic transmission are mounted-longitudinally on the left rear of the vehicle. The engine has an output of 265 kW (355 hp). It is fitted with a 4-speed automatic Voith DIWA 864.5 gearbox.

=== Asia-Pacific ===
MAN NG363F (A24)
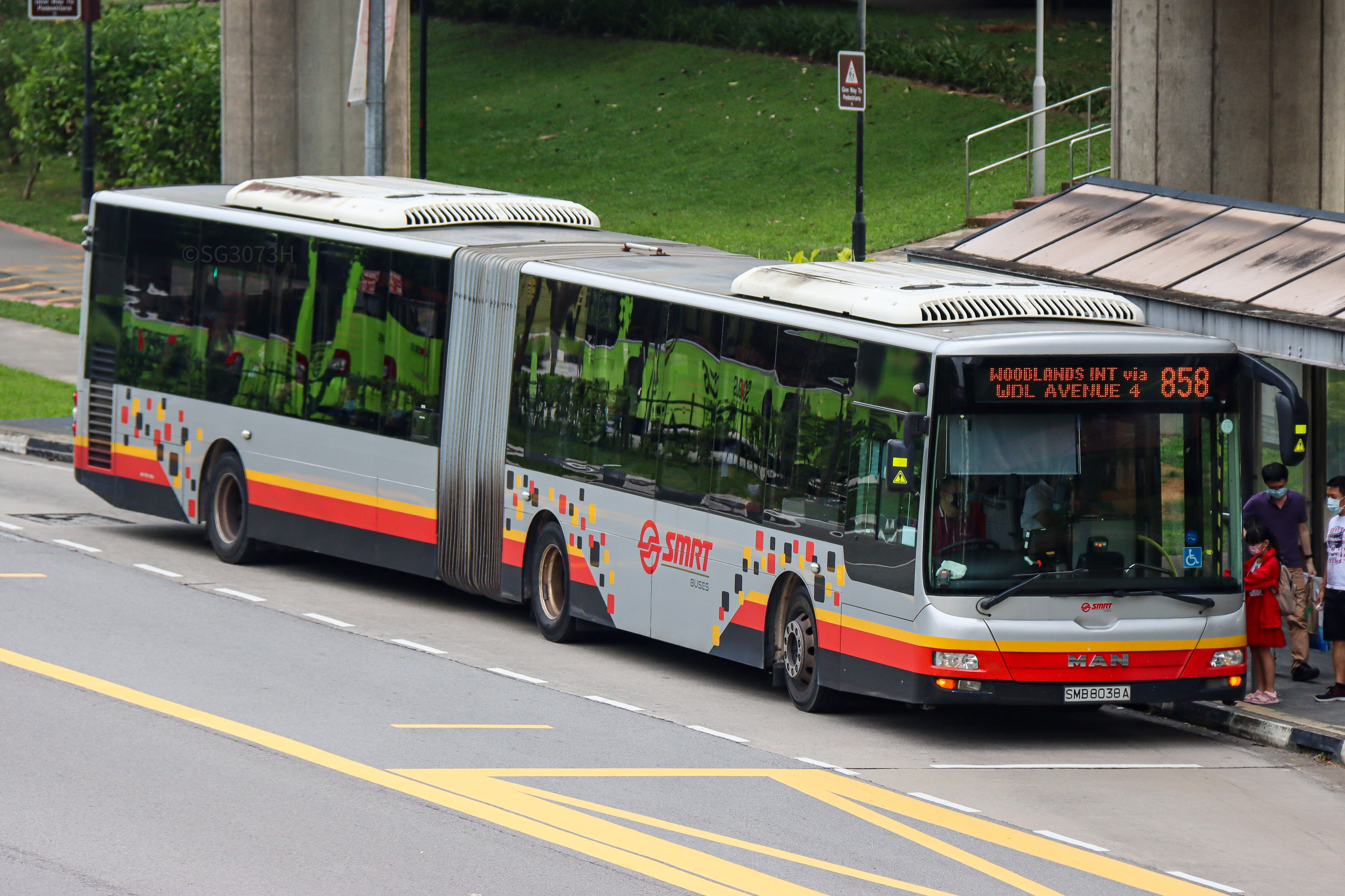

Overview
- Manufacturer: MAN
- Assembly: Munich, Germany

Body and chassis
- Class: Bus chassis
- Body style: Articulated bus
- Doors: 3
- Floor type: Low floor

Powertrain
- Engine: A24 (Euro V): MAN D 2066 LUH-33 (NG363F)
- Power output: 360 hp (265 kW)
- Transmission: Voith DIWA

Dimensions
- Length: 17.98 m (bodied)
- Width: 2.5m

==== Singapore ====
In 2013, SMRT Buses received a MAN NG363F A24 prototype unit, SMB388S, for testing and evaluation from the local MAN's dealer, ST Kinetics. The chassis was built in Germany and later assembly in Gemilang Coachworks of Malaysia. On 18 April 2013, the bus was deployed on Bus 190 making its debut as the first new articulated bus brought in by SMRT Buses after the re-branding, and the first low-floor layout and wheelchair accessible bendy bus (WAB) in Singapore. This articulated bus is currently operated by SMRT Buses, being the only bendy bus in Singapore to be registered with the SMRT original livery.

Following the successful evaluation of SMB388S, SMRT Buses announced in April 2014 they would be acquiring an additional 39 units to replace the retiring Mercedes-Benz O405G articulated buses. The production batch of NG363F A24 was delivered in 2015, built and bodied in Malaysia by Gemilang Coachworks, and debuted in May that year.

As part of the Bus Contracting Model (BCM), some of the buses were transferred to SBS Transit and Tower Transit Singapore under the Seletar and Sembawang-Yishun Bus Packages respectively. SBS Transit MAN A24 units were restricted to deployment on certain Yishun feeder buses (800, 804, 806, 807, 811). All 12 MAN A24 articulated buses are progressively repainted from SMRT's pixel livery to LTA's lush green livery its distinctive shade useful for MAN A22 Lion's City Hybrid Mark I (Euro 5) buses.

== Gallery ==
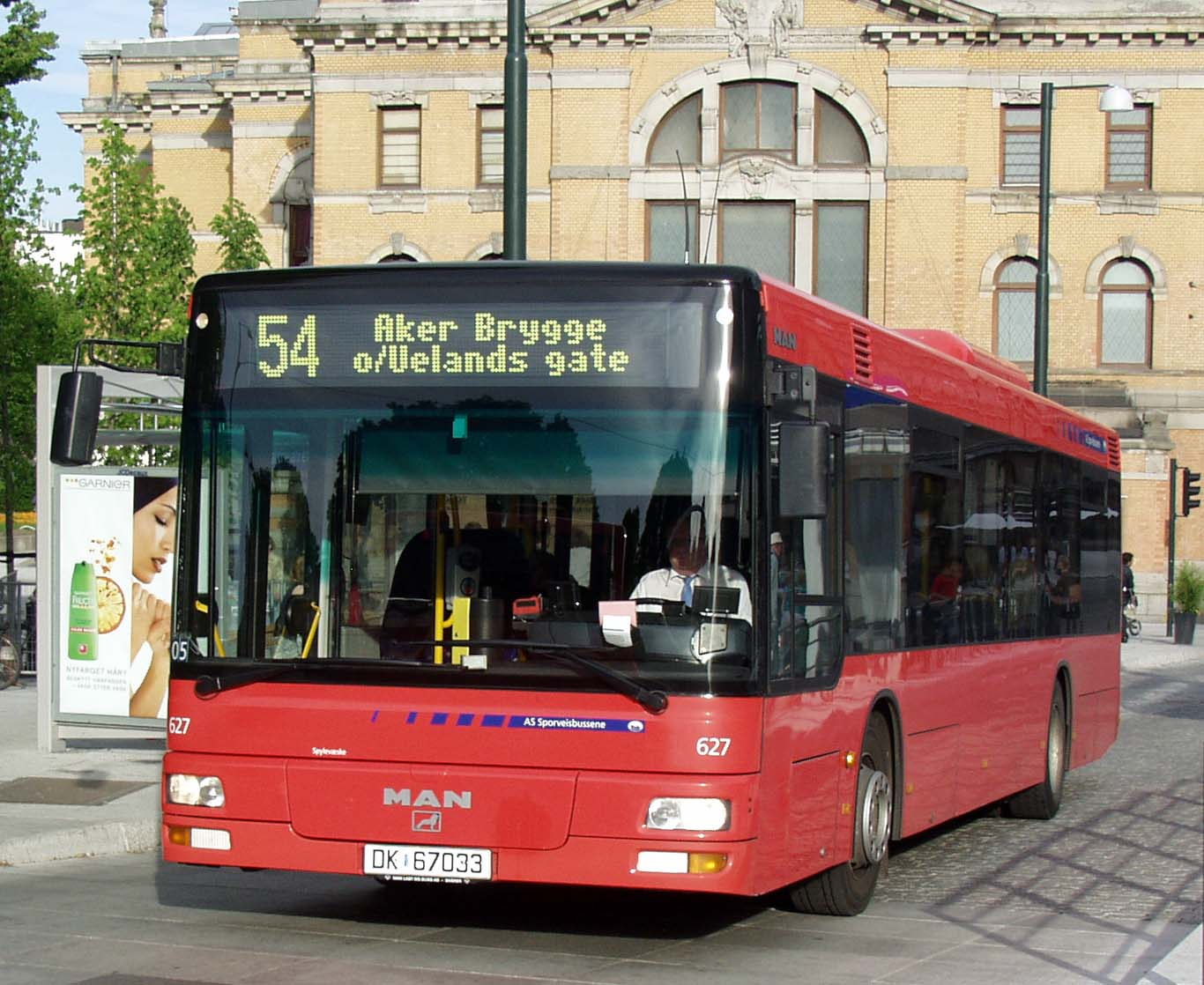
NL 263 (A21) in Oslo

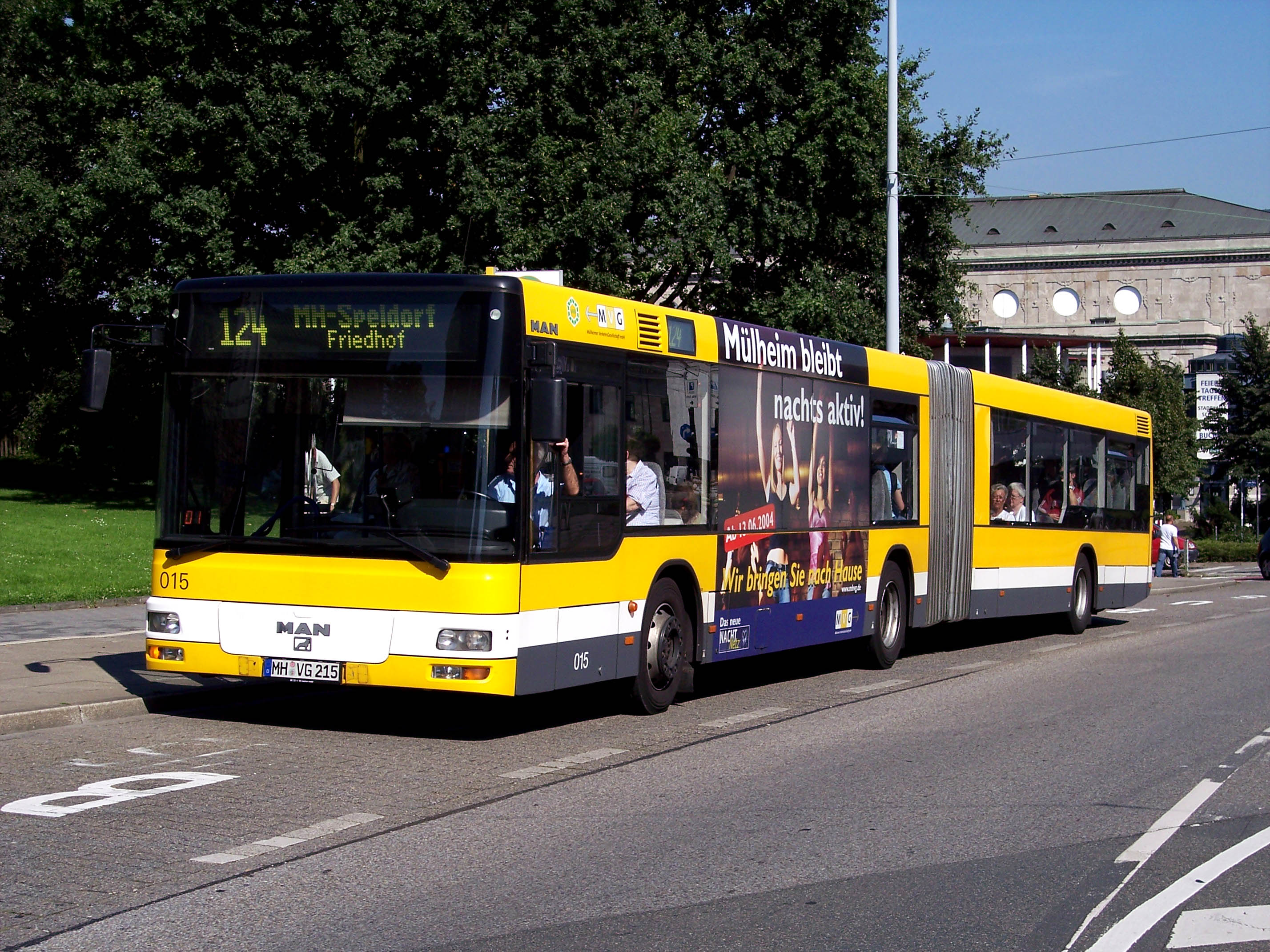
NG 313 (A23) in Mülheim an der Ruhr

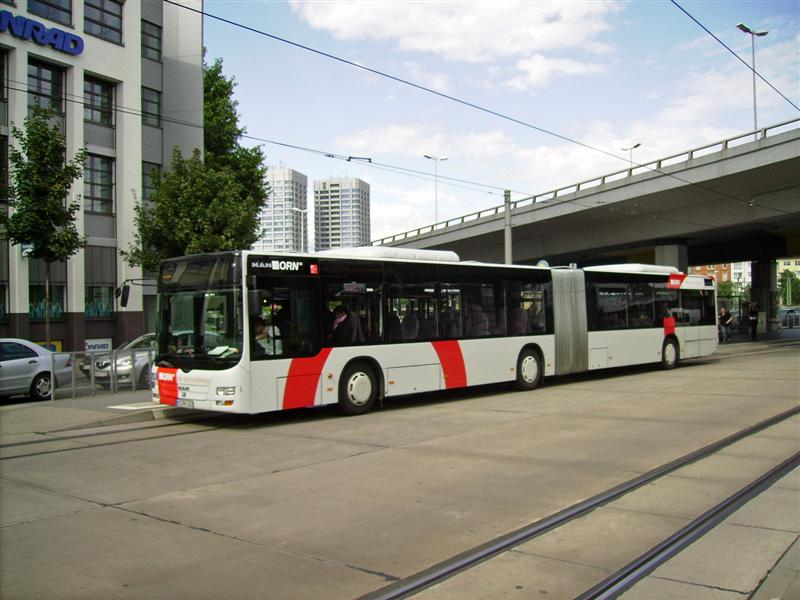
ORN Lion's City G at Mainz Central Station

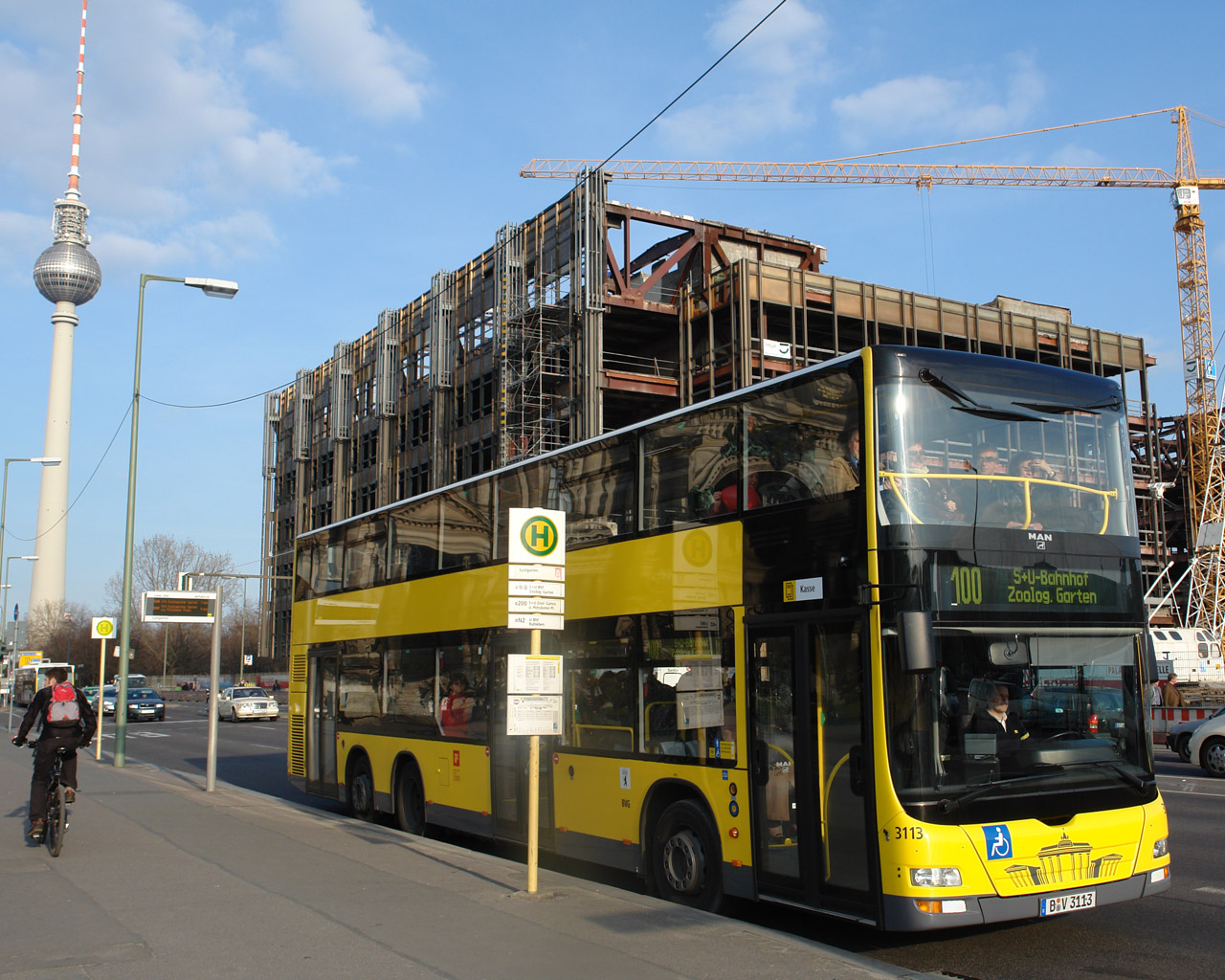
Lion's City DD in Berlin

MAN Lion's City A22 & A95 in Singapore

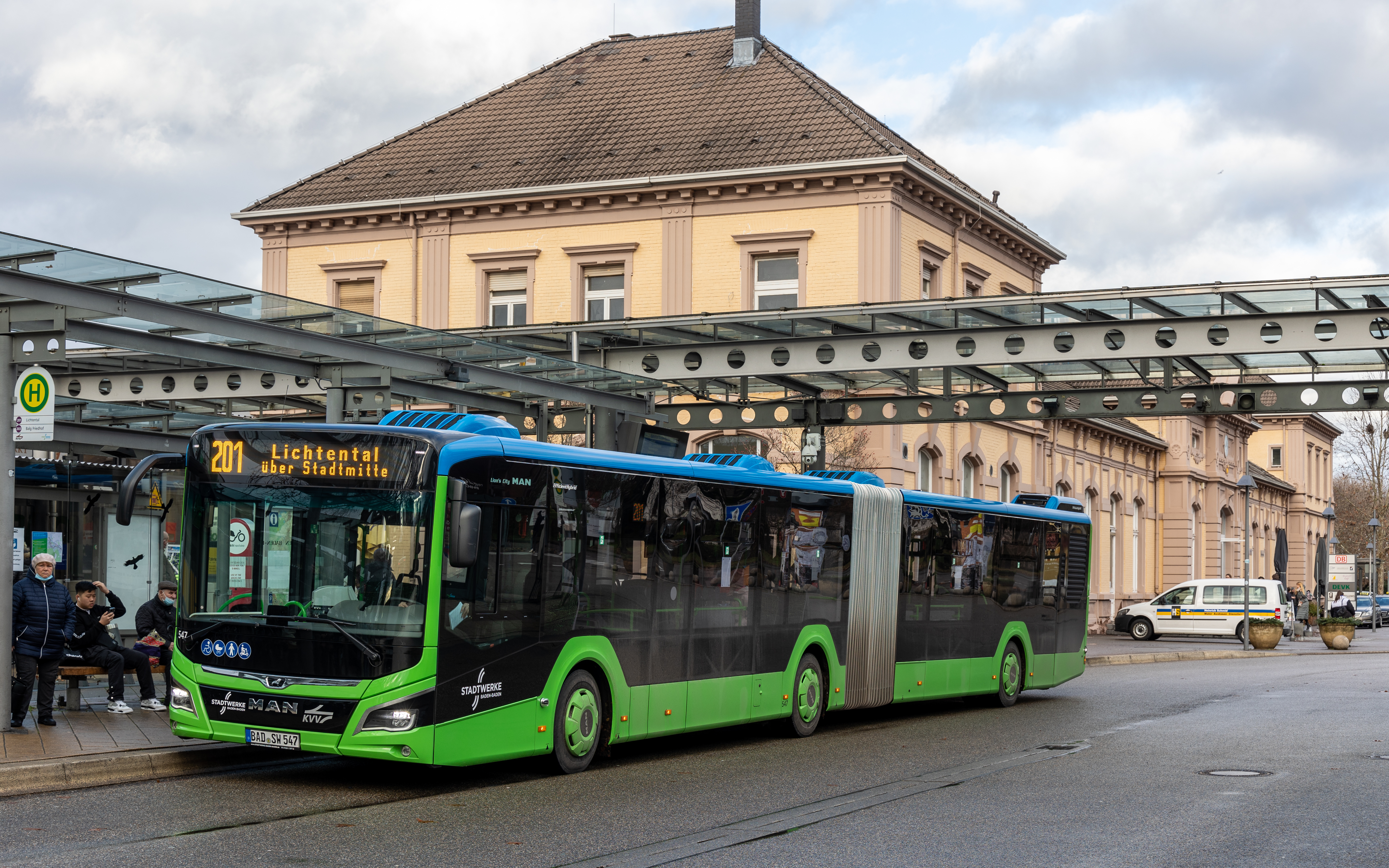
MAN Lion's City EfficientHybrid at Baden-Baden station

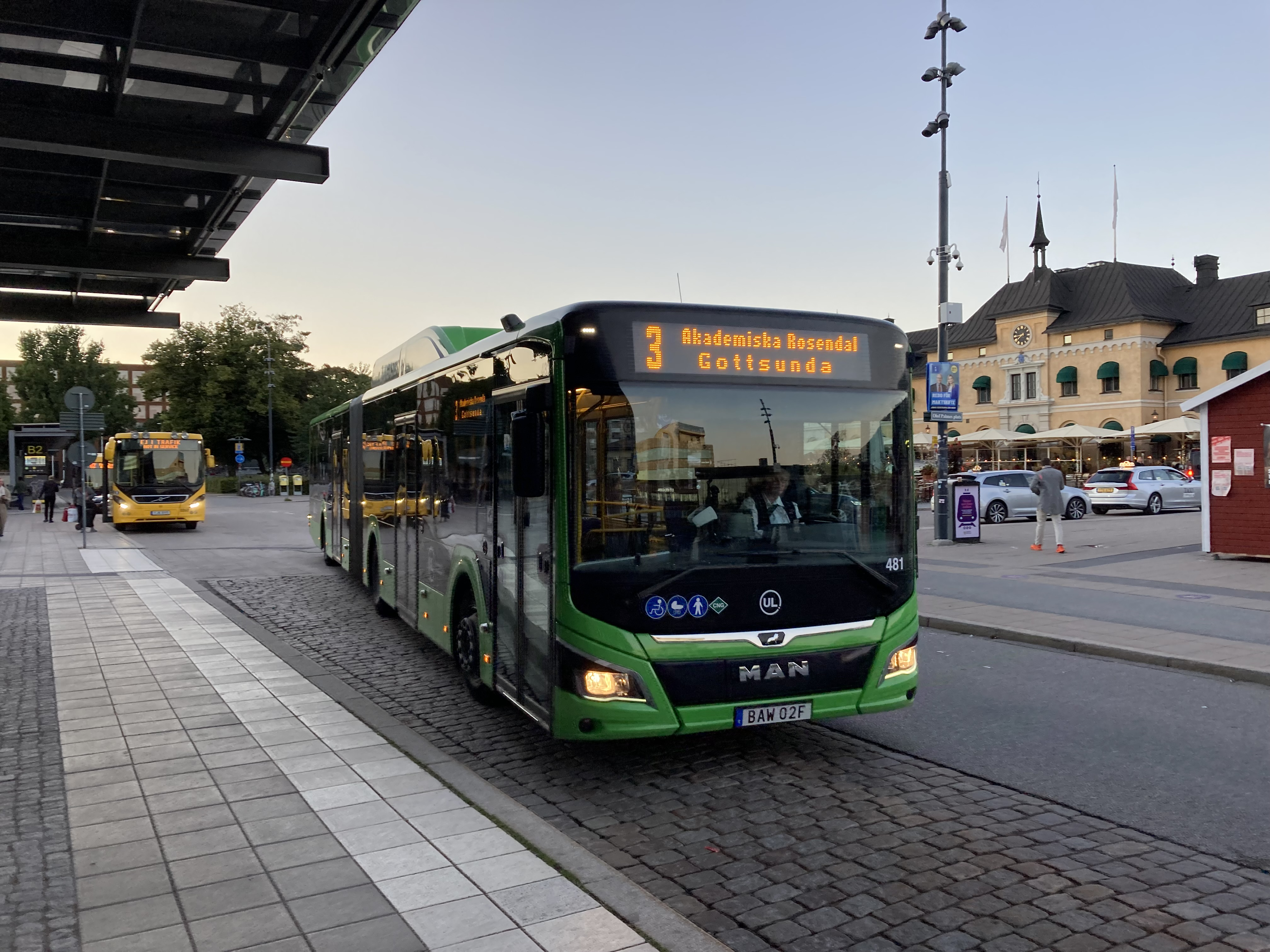
MAN Lion's City 18c CNG EfficientHybrid in Uppsala

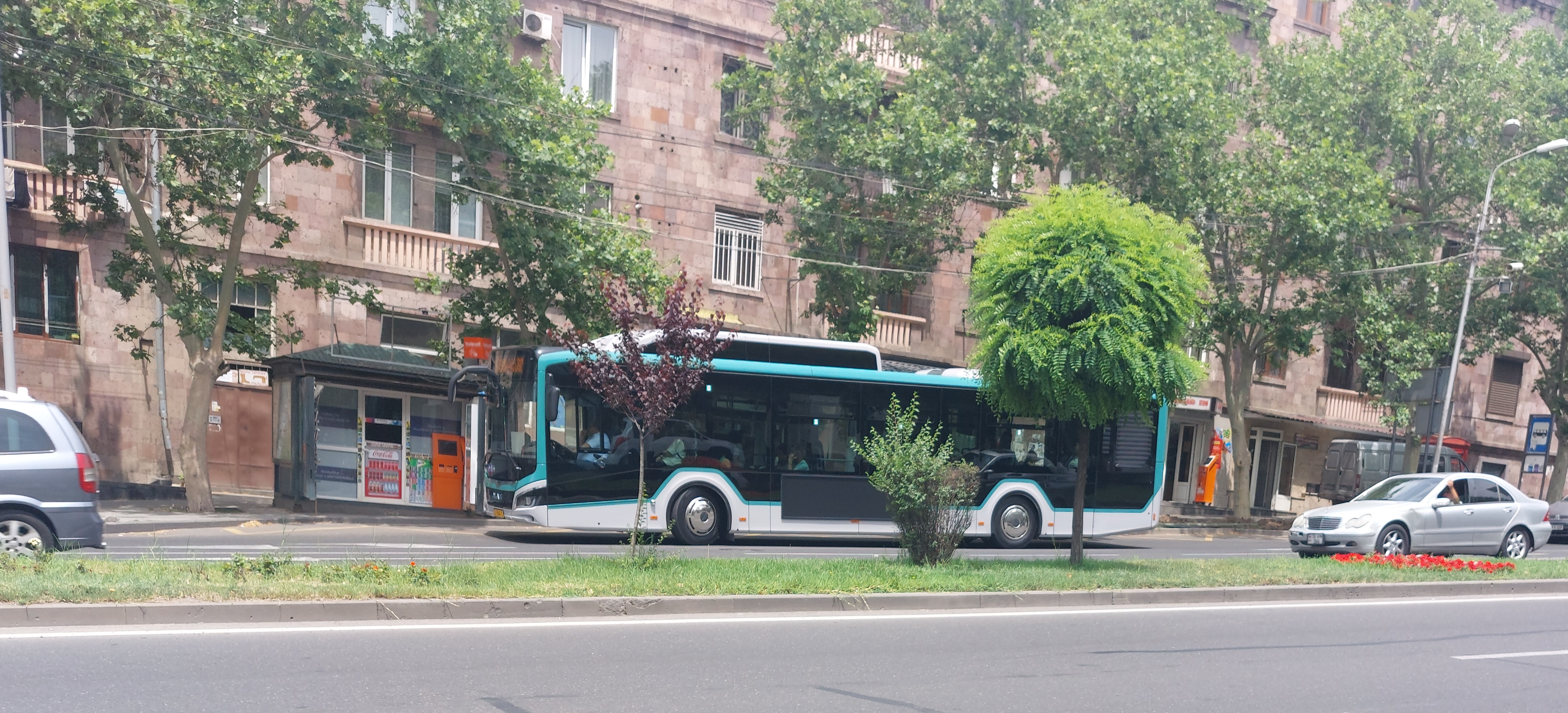
MAN Lion's City 12G Bus on line 1 in Yerevan

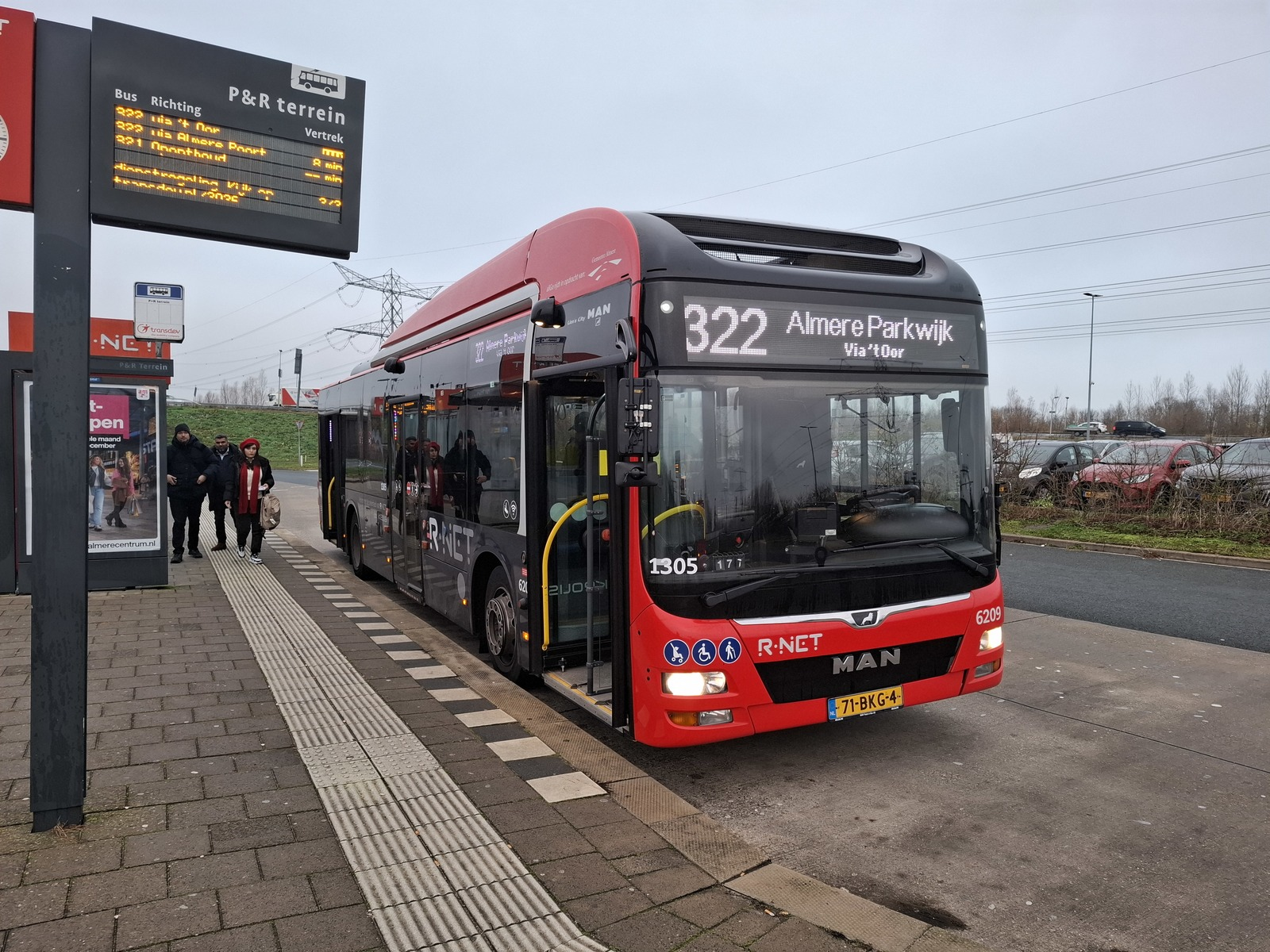
MAN Lion's City A37 BRT on line 322 in Muiden, The Netherlands

== See also ==
- List of buses
