= MAN 18.2x0 =

Low-entry 2-axle single-decker bus chassis built for right-hand drive markets

MAN 18.220
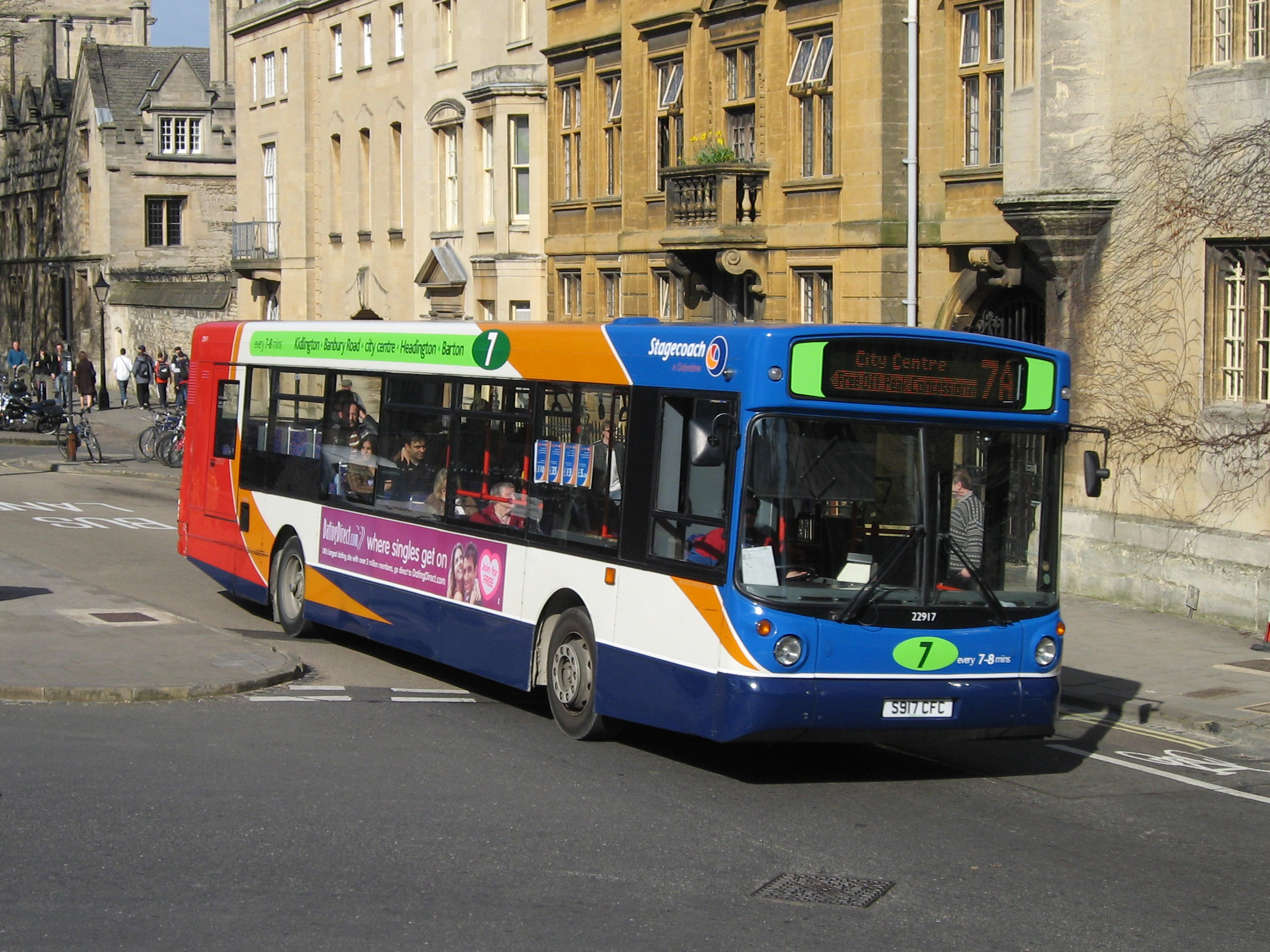
- Stagecoach Oxfordshire Alexander ALX300 bodied MAN 18.220

Overview
- Manufacturer: MAN Truck & Bus
- Production: 1998–2017

Body and chassis
- Doors: 1-2
- Floor type: Low entry

Powertrain
- Engine: MAN D0836
- Transmission: ZF Ecomat; ZF EcoLife; Voith DIWA

Chronology
- Predecessor: MAN 11.1x0
- Successor: MAN Lion's Chassis

The MAN 18.220 is a model of low-entry single-decker bus chassis manufactured by MAN Truck & Bus between 1998 and 2017, predominantly for the United Kingdom and Ireland. Over the course of nearly two decades of production, more than 1,000 were produced.

The model was introduced as the MAN 18.220 in October 1998 as one of the first low-floor buses on the market, with the first examples being delivered to Stagecoach Oxfordshire. The vast majority were constructed with Alexander ALX300 bodywork for Stagecoach Group, who ordered more than 500 ALX300s in total between 1998 and 2007 as the predominant low-floor single-decker bus in their fleet. In addition, a small number of 18.220s were produced for independent operators with Ikarus Polaris and Marcopolo Viale bodywork, primarily in the United Kingdom and in Ireland respectively.

An upgraded model, the MAN 18.240LF, was launched in December 2006. The first examples, fitted with East Lancs Kinetec bodywork, were delivered to Stagecoach West Scotland; these were followed by a final batch of ALX300s for Stagecoach Yorkshire, before series production of the ALX300's replacement, the Alexander Dennis Enviro300, commenced in January 2008. Stagecoach were once again the primary customer for the 18.240LF, ordering more than 300 examples with Enviro300 bodywork; the final vehicle was delivered in March 2010. In 2019, Stagecoach commenced replacing the Euro 4 MAN engines with Euro 6 Cummins ISBs in some of its 18.240s.

From October 2009, the 18.240LF was complemented by the mechanically similar MAN 18.250 in the model line-up, the only major difference being the provision of a more powerful engine, rated at 250 horsepower (an increase of ten horsepower over the base model). A total of 31 MAN 18.250s were produced, all of which were purchased by Stagecoach with ADL Enviro300 bodywork. The final 18.250 was delivered in March 2010.

A compressed natural gas-powered variant, the MAN 18.270, was introduced in November 2012; this model exclusively featured Caetano EcoCity bodywork. A total of 44 MAN 18.270s were produced before production ceased in August 2017. Arriva UK Bus were the largest customer, primarily for its North East and North West subsidiaries. Anglian Bus was the only other operator to purchase 18.270s.

The 18.220 series was succeeded by the MAN Lion's Chassis. However, this model had significantly poorer sales in the United Kingdom, with only a small number produced with Wright Meridian bodywork before MAN exited the British bus market due to falling sales.

The MAN 18.280 was sold in Australasia with TransAdelaide purchasing 76, Premier Transport Group nine and Ritchies Transport 11.
