= Lion's City =

Lion's City may refer to:

- MAN Lion's City, a range of buses
- Singapore, often known as the Lion City
- Lviv, lion city in Ukraine
