= Neoman Bus =

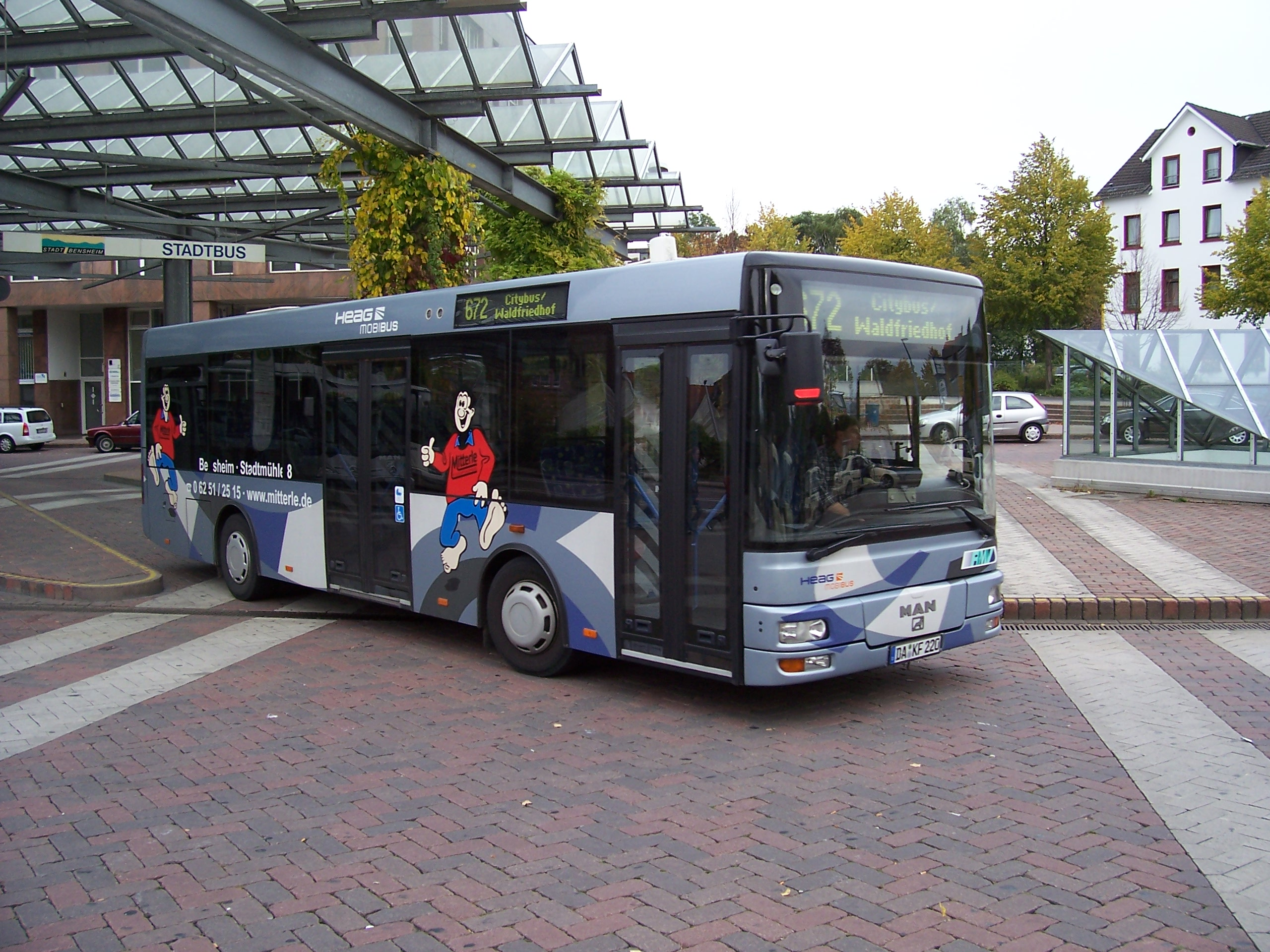
MAN NM 223

Neoman Bus GmbH, also known as Neoman Bus Group, was a bus, trolleybus and coach manufacturer in Germany, created when MAN Nutzfahrzeuge AG acquired Neoplan Bus GmbH in 2001. While the parent company also makes trucks and other vehicles, Neoman was focused on bus and coach production. Electric trolleybuses built by Neoman, at its Pilsting factory, were sold under the Neoplan brand name.

Parent company MAN Nutzfahrzeuge later referred to Neoman as its Bus Division. On 1 February 2008, the Neoman name ceased to exist, its operations being fully taken over by the parent company, with operations continuing under the Neoplan and MAN brands.

The former Neoplan factory in Pilsting was taken over by Viseon Bus GmbH in April 2009.

== See also ==
- MANAŞ Ankara, Turkey
- Büssing
