= East Lancs Kinetec =

Range of low-floor bus bodies for MAN chassis

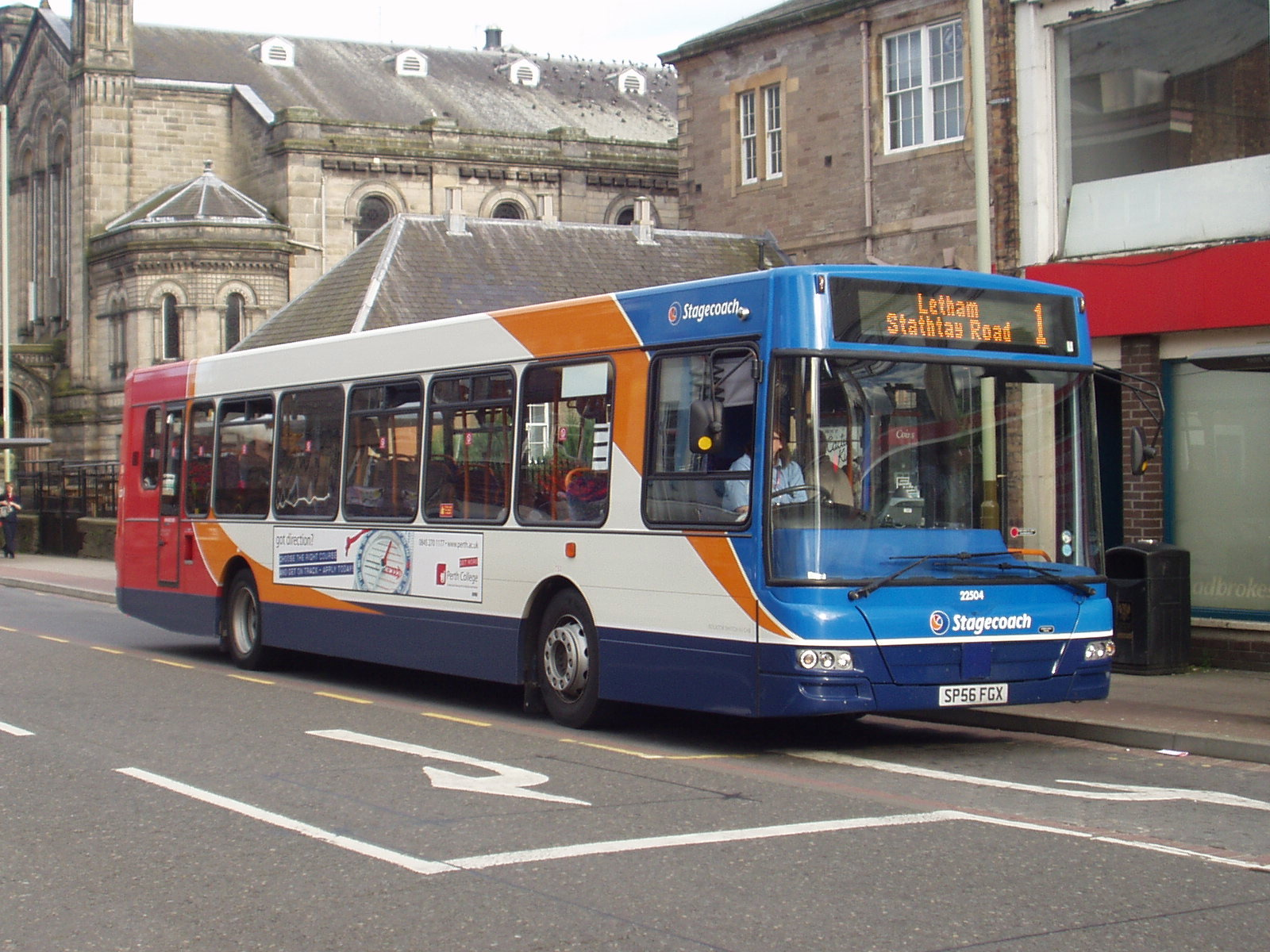
- Stagecoach East Scotland East Lancs Kinetec bodied MAN 18.240 in Perth in August 2008

Overview
- Manufacturer: East Lancashire Coachbuilders
- Production: 2006–2010

Body and chassis
- Doors: 1
- Floor type: Low floor
- Chassis: MAN 18.240 (Kinetec); MAN ND283F (Kinetec+)
- Related: East Lancs Esteem; East Lancs Olympus

Powertrain
- Engine: MAN

The East Lancs Kinetec is a type of low-floor bus body manufactured by East Lancashire Coachbuilders for single and double-decker MAN Truck & Bus chassis. Both variants, built with Alcan aluminium extrusions, were launched at the 2006 Euro Bus Expo, notably featuring front fascia panels from MAN's integral Lion's City bus.

== Design ==
=== Kinetec single-deck ===
The standard Kinetec is a single-deck bus body based on East Lancs' existing Esteem body. Reviews from its launch at the 2006 Euro Bus Expo were very poor.

=== Kinetec+ double decker ===
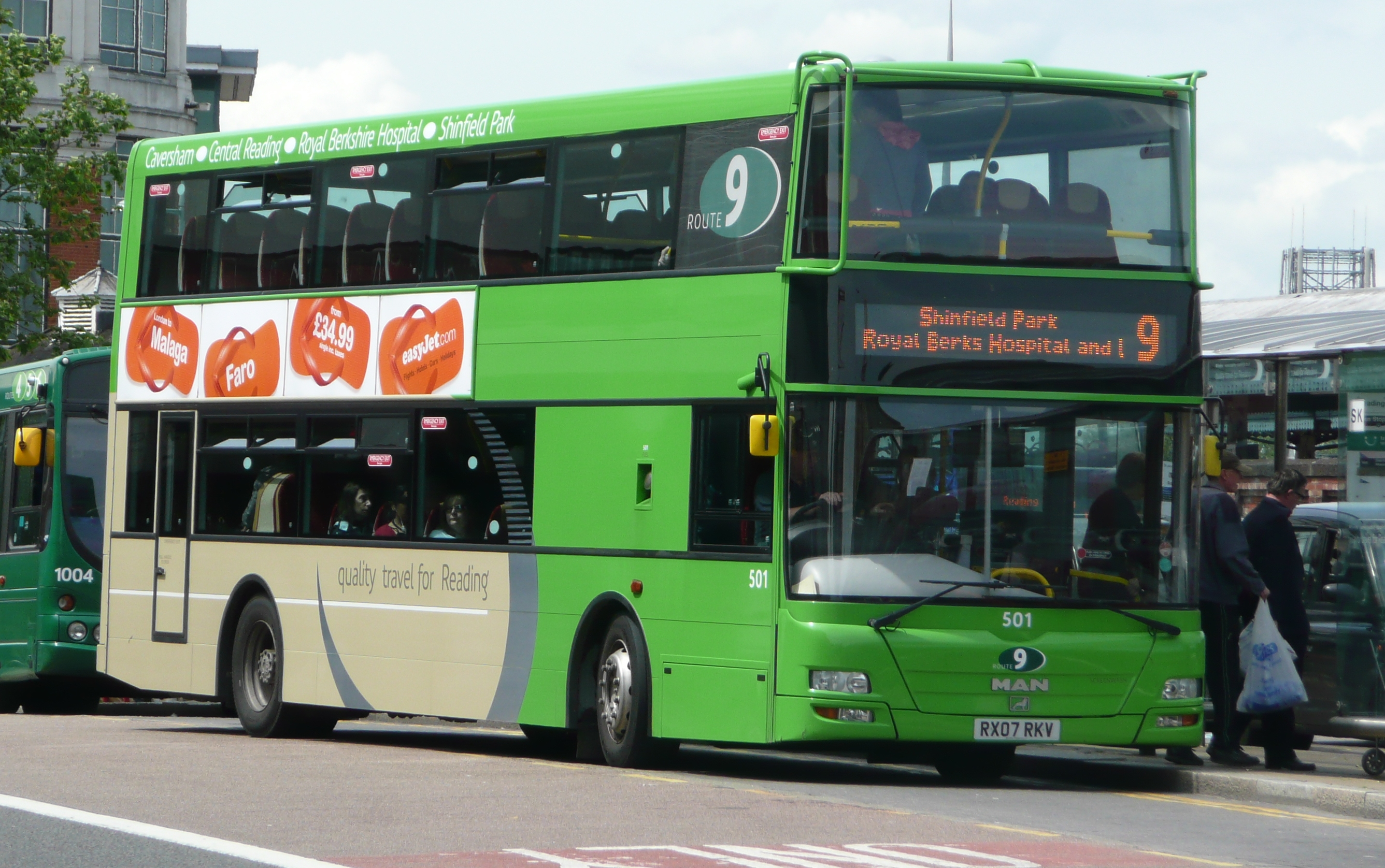
The only East Lancs Kinetec+ produced, operated by Reading Buses in May 2008

The Kinetec+ is a low-floor double-decker bus body on the MAN ND283F (A48) chassis, marketed as a variant of East Lancs' existing Olympus double-deck body. The engine of the bus was fitted longitudinally at the rear left-hand corner of the body, wide single tyres were fitted at the rear to reduce wheel arch intrusion into the lower deck, and a portal axle allowed for the Kinetec+ to be built with a step-free floor.

The first prototype Kinetec+ body was built to a 4 metres (13 ft) low-height design to fit European Union regulations, but which has been criticised. Another prototype built to Transport for London specification, with a roof height of 4.3 metres (14 ft), had been planned, however this never materialised.

== Operators ==
Stagecoach West Scotland took delivery of ten Kinetec single-decks on MAN 18.240 chassis in 2006. While new into service, some of these buses suffered from windows falling out of their frames.

== See also ==
- East Lancs OmniTown, an East Lancs body also built with a chassis manufacturer's front fascia
