= Northcoast Bus & Coach =

Australian bus manufacturer

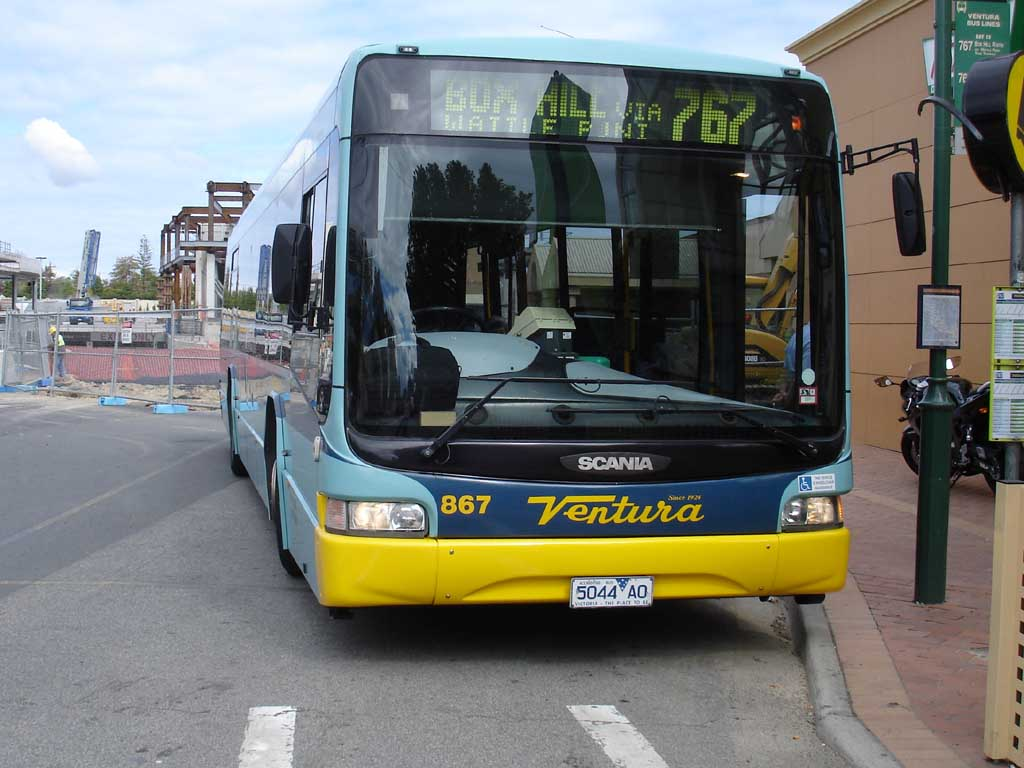
- Ventura Bus Lines Scania L94UB at Chadstone Shopping Centre in April 2008
- Industry: Bus manufacturing
- Founded: 1985
- Founder: Wayne Smith; Daryl Wells
- Defunct: 2014
- Headquarters: Caloundra, Australia
- Website: www.ncbc.com.au

Northcoast Bus & Coach was an Australian bus bodybuilder in Caloundra.

== History ==
Northcoast Bus & Coach was formed in 1985 by former GBW employees Wayne Smith and Daryl Wells from premises in Maroochydore. The first body completed was on a former Melbourne-Brighton Bus Lines Leyland Leopard for Bellarine Bus Lines. In 1990, the business moved to Caloundra.

In 1998, a heads of agreement was signed for Greyhound Pioneer Australia to purchase a shareholding in the business. It was never completed, with Greyhound electing to establish Queensland Coach Company instead.

Among some of the larger orders were a batch of Volvo B12Rs for the Australian Defence Force, Scania L113CRLs and L94UBs for Ventura Bus Lines and L94UBs for Metro Tasmania.

In 2010, Northcoast gained a licence to jointly assemble Gemilang Coachworks' Eco Range buses for the Australian and New Zealand markets. Frames were produced in Malaysia, through a joint venture between both companies. The first buses were produced for the Pulitano Group. By 2014, the partnership has ceased when Gemilang gained Australian Design Rules approval for its Malaysian products in its own right.

It ceased manufacturing operations in 2014 having built over 600 bodies.
