= Gemilang Coachworks =

Commercial vehicle manufacturer

Gemilang Coachwork Sdn Bhd
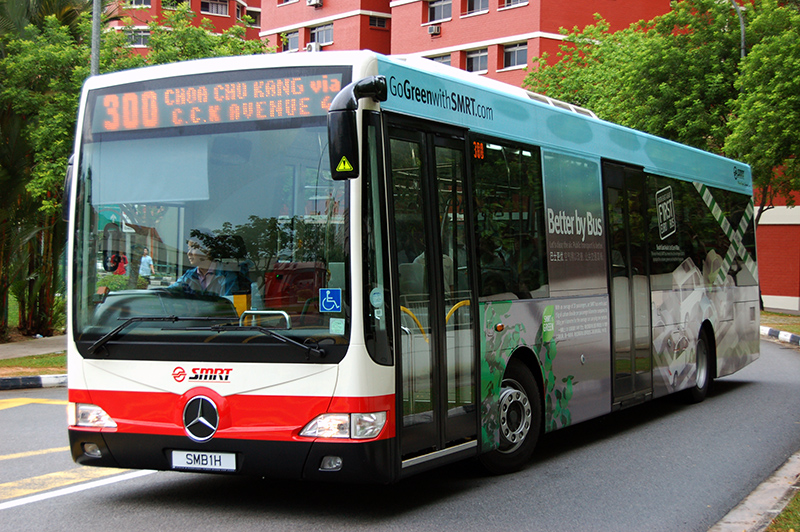
- Type: Private Limited Company
- Traded as: SEHK: 6163
- Industry: Bus manufacturing
- Founded: 23 September 1989; 37 years ago
- Headquarters: Johor, Malaysia
- Key people: Pang Chong Yong (Managing Director)
- Products: City buses, coaches, electric buses
- Services: Design and manufacture bus bodies; bus assembly
- Website: www.gml.com.my

Based in Johor, Malaysia, Gemilang Coachwork Sdn Bhd (GML) specialises in designing and manufacturing bus bodies and the assembly of buses. GML is also one of the first companies in Malaysia to assemble fully electric buses.

GML is a wholly owned subsidiary of Gemilang International Limited, which issued shares are listed on the Main Board of Hong Kong Stock Exchange (Stock Code: 6163 HK).

== History ==
Gemilang Coachwork was founded on 23 September 1989 to assemble wooden bodies for bus and truck chassis. Today, GML is a bus body builder having exported more than 3,000 buses to the United States, Australia, Singapore, UAE, Taiwan, Hong Kong, New Zealand, Vietnam and other countries for a wide range of international chassis manufacturers and bus operators.

GML first exported their products by entering the Australian market and exported over 100 units in 1999. Other notable orders from the export markets include 1,101 Scania K230UB buses for SBS Transit, MAN NL323F (A22) for Discovery Bay of Hong Kong and Land Transport Authority of Singapore and also 790 Scania K250UB / K270UB buses for Rapid Bus of Malaysia. Another notable example is the MAN Lion's City DD L concept bus, which had its bodywork fitted by Gemilang on the MAN ND323F (A95) chassis for the Land Transport Authority of Singapore. while the MAN ND323F/ND363F (A95) buses for the Hong Kong market which has franchised bus companies of Hong Kong, namely KMB, Citybus, Discovery Bay, and NLB. and other 10.3 metre MAN 14.250 HOCL-NL (chassis code A66) buses only bus company Discovery Bay of Hong Kong.

Gemilang Australia was formed on 15 September 2009, and the founder and controlling shareholder of GML, CY Pang, was a 50% shareholder. In 2010, Australian bus body manufacturer Northcoast Bus & Coach, based in Queensland, gained a licence to jointly assemble the Eco Range buses with GML for the Australian and New Zealand markets. Frames were produced in Malaysia, through a joint venture between both companies. The first buses were produced for the Pulitano Group. By 2014, Gemilang Australia gained Australian Design Rules approval for its Malaysian products in its own right, and eventually ceased its partnership with Northcoast. Pang transferred his 50% shareholding in Gemilang Australia to GML in July 2016.

GML sold its 50% shareholding of Gemilang Australia in June 2019, but continued to supply part-assembled knock-down bus kits of its Eco Range buses to Gemilang Australia, who would finish assembly in Australia, as part of a long-term distribution agreement. Since then, Gemilang Australia has been owned by the GoZero Group.

In 2021, GML delivered more than 100 fully electric buses to the US and Australia.

== Products ==
Gemilang Coachwork currently offers various aluminium bus bodywork designs (including the licensed MAN Lion's City bodywork range) & configurations that could be customised to meet different manufacturers, operators & regional requirements. Over the years, Gemilang had supplied bodies for BYD, Zhejiang CRRC, Daewoo, Dennis, Higer, Hino Motors, Hyundai, King Long, MAN, Mercedes-Benz, Nissan, Scania AB, Sunlong, Volvo AB & Linkker bus chassis.

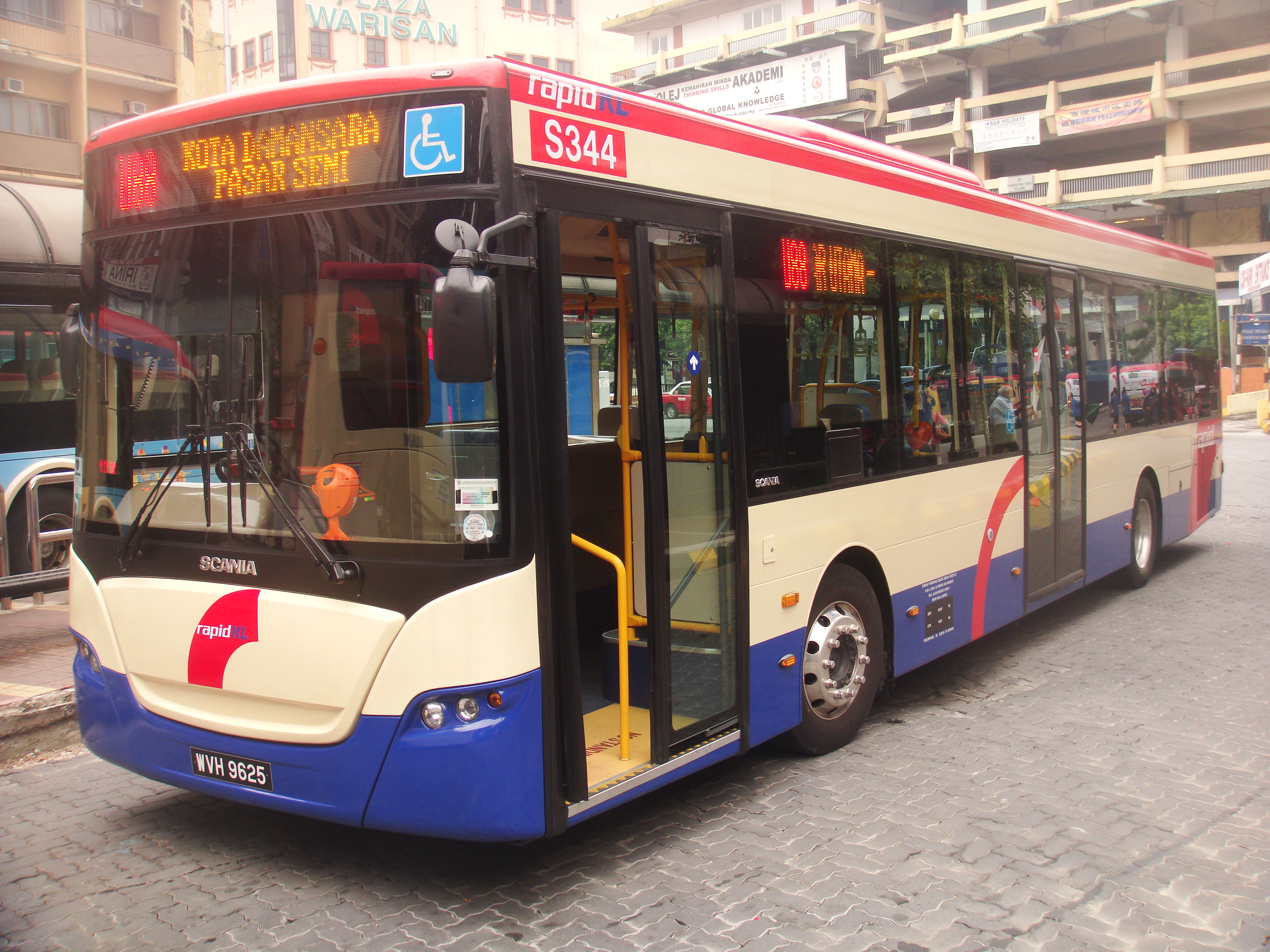
Gemilang bodied Scania K270UB low floor bus as operated by RapidKL, Malaysia

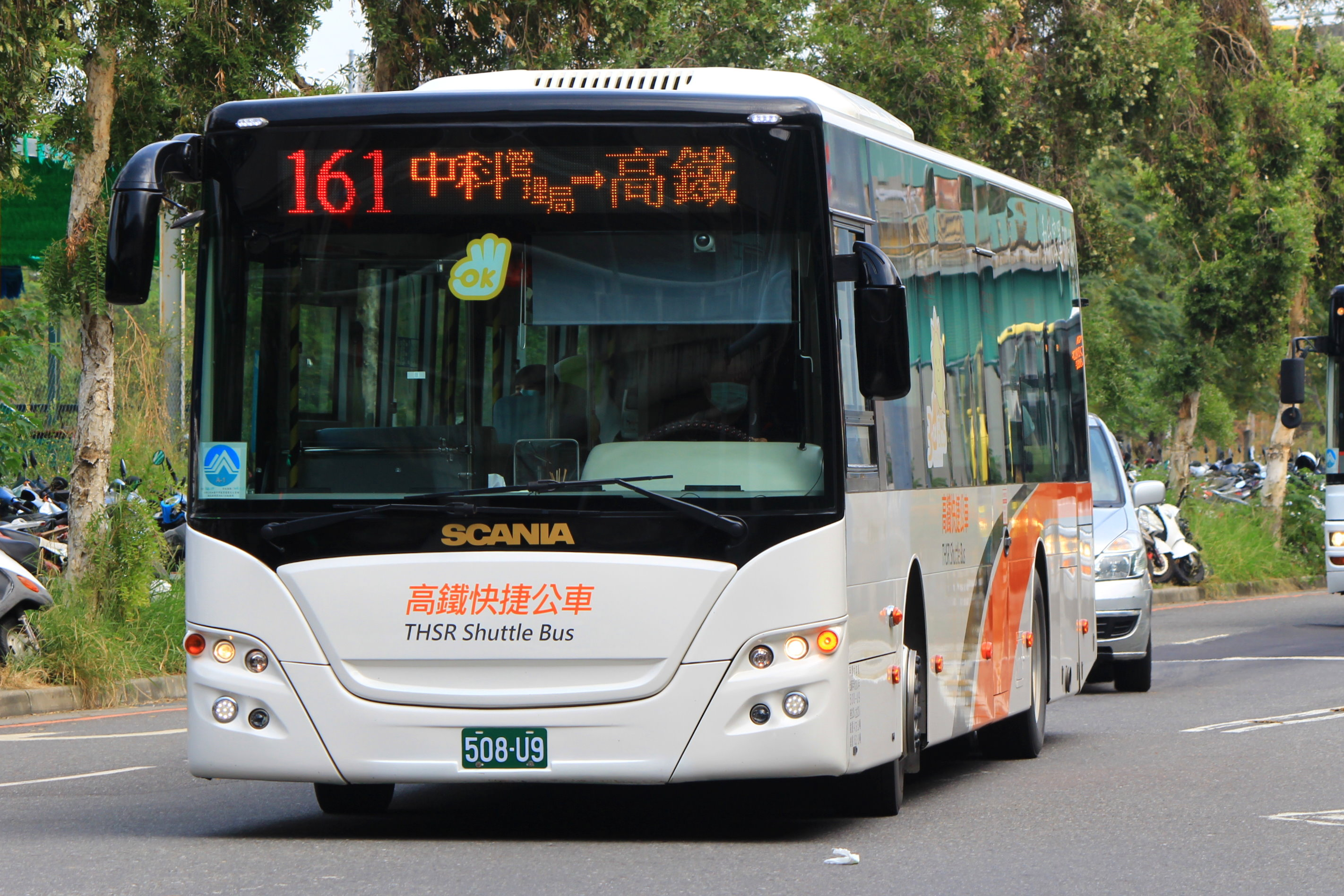
A Gemilang Coachworks bodied RHD Scania N230UB bus operated by Ho-Hsin Bus (zh) in Taichung, Taiwan

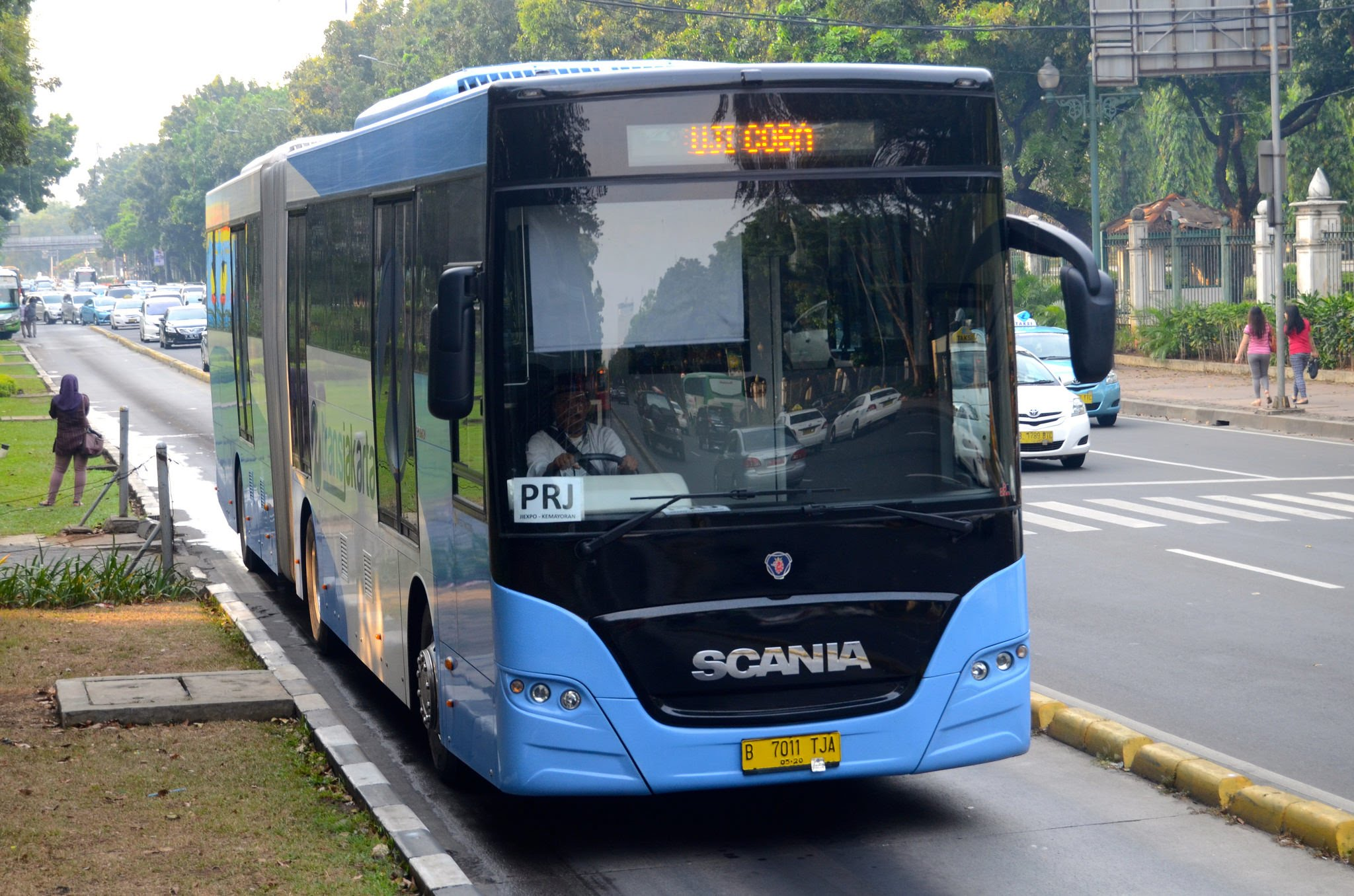
Gemilang bodied Scania K340IA articulated bus for Transjakarta bus rapid transit

Gemilang Bodied MAN A22 & MAN A95 operated by Tower Transit, Singapore

Gemilang Bodied MAN RR8 operated by New Lantao Bus, Hong Kong

Gemilang Bodied MAN A95 operated by B-Line, Australia
