= Viseon Bus =

German vehicle manufacturer

Viseon Bus GmbH
- Company type: Limited liability company
- Predecessor: Neoman Bus
- Founded: 2008
- Defunct: 2014
- Fate: Liquidated
- Successor: None
- Headquarters: Pilsting, Bavaria, Germany
- Area served: International
- Products: Buses, trolleybuses, highway coaches, special-purpose buses
- Number of employees: 220

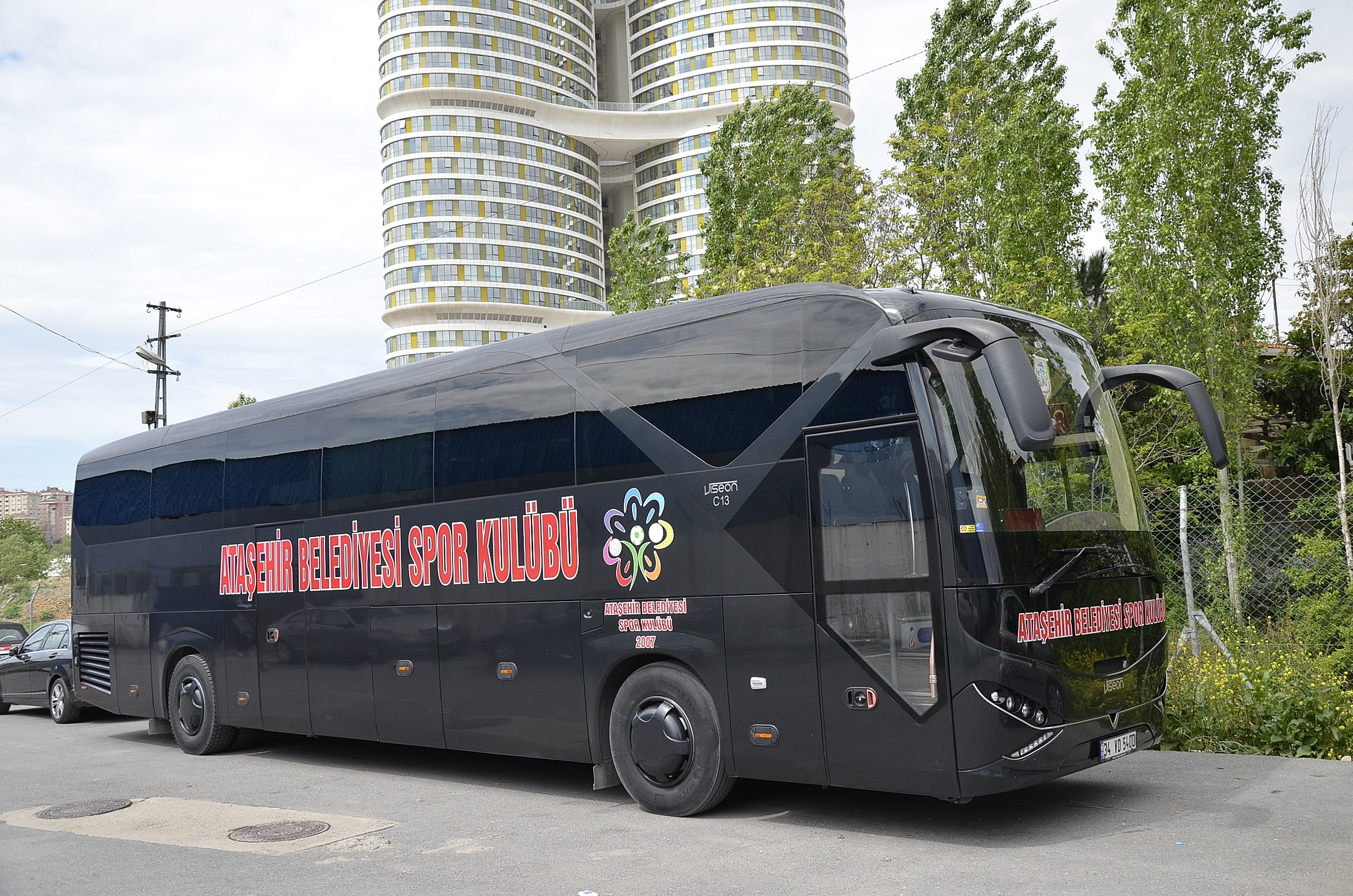
A Viseon coach owned by Ataşehir Belediyespor women's football club in Istanbul, Turkey

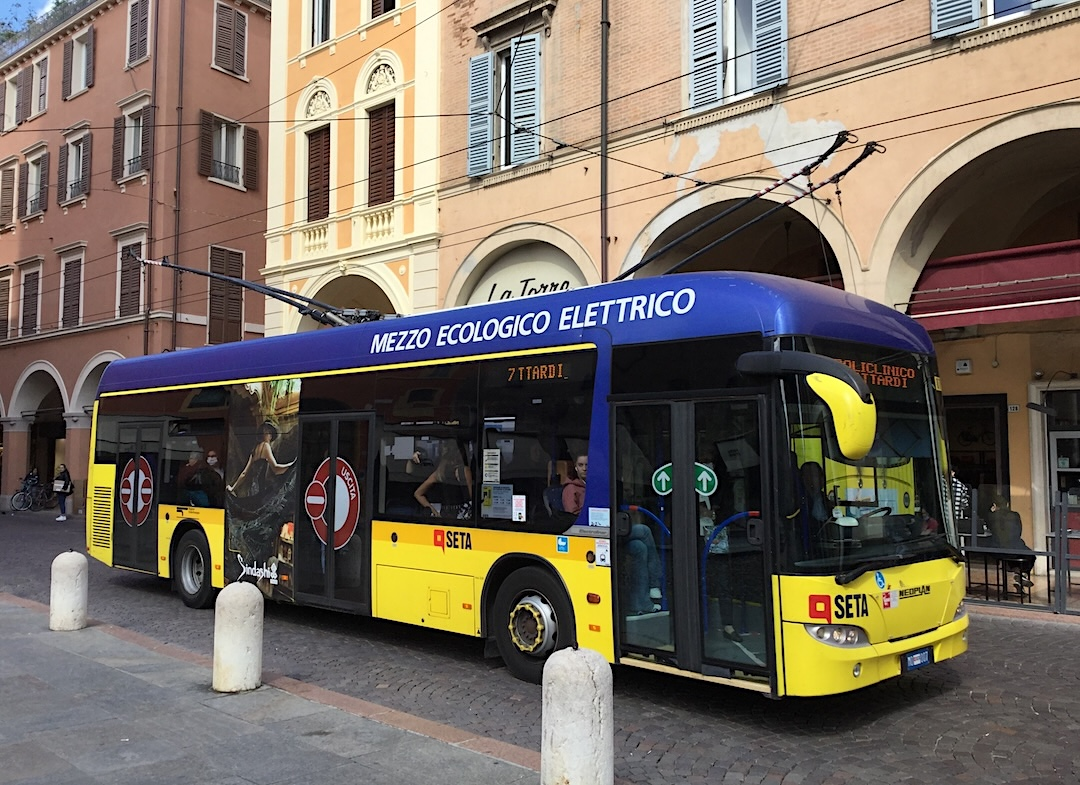
Two trolleybuses for Modena were built by Viseon in 2009–2010 but using Neoplan designs and showing Neoplan nameplates.

Viseon Bus GmbH was a German bus, trolleybus and coach manufacturer, based in Pilsting, Bavaria, Germany. It was established in July 2008, and in April 2009 it took over the former Neoman bus and coach production facility of MAN Truck & Bus in Pilsting and a workforce of 220 employees. That plant had been manufacturing vehicles under the Neoplan brand, owned by MAN since 2001. Because of financial difficulties, Viseon Bus ceased production in 2013 and was liquidated in 2014.

Viseon made buses for use in urban public transport, use at airports, use as inter-city coaches and for other purposes. Coach models included double-deckers as well as single-deckers.

In March 2010, the company secured a contract to supply 12 articulated trolleybuses for a new trolleybus system to be constructed to serve the campus of the new King Saud bin Abdulaziz University for Health Sciences, in Riyadh, Saudi Arabia. Later reports indicated the vehicles were Viseon model LT20. The first was demonstrated on the Solingen trolleybus system in June 2011, and the full series entered service in Riyadh in April 2013. Viseon also built two two-axle trolleybuses for the trolleybus system of Modena, Italy, in 2010. Modena had placed the order for these model N6216 vehicles in 2008, with Viseon's predecessor, Neoplan, under an option from an earlier contract, but they were actually built by Viseon Bus, in 2009–10, and delivered in July 2010.

In December 2012, China Youngman Automobile Group Co. Ltd. (Youngman) acquired a 74.9-percent stake in Viseon, concluding implementation of an agreement signed on 1 August 2012. Since 1994, Youngman had had licensing agreements with Viseon's predecessor, Neoplan (owned by MAN after 2001), under which it was able to adapt Neoplan designs and build buses to those designs for the Chinese and Southeast Asian market. (At one time, the Chinese production was named Jinhua Neoplan Vehicle Co. Ltd., or Neoplan Jinhua, before simply taking the Youngman name.) This partnership carried over to Viseon when it was established in 2008 as a spin-off of part of MAN's Neoplan-branded bus production.

At the time of the 2012 agreement, Youngman was one of China's largest bus manufacturers, building more than 4,800 buses per year in past years. It was planned that development and construction of buses would continue at Viseon's factory in Pilsting, and envisaged that Youngman models would also be developed and built there for the European market. The company introduced a new double-deck coach model in June 2012, a 12.6-metre (41 ft), three-axle model designated LDD13.

However, because of financial difficulties, Viseon Bus filed for insolvency in April 2013. Its more than 200 employees were terminated in June 2013, and the vacated factory complex in Pilsting was sold in May 2014. The Pilsting plant had been in operation for 40 years, since 1973, and at Neoplan's peak, the company had employed more than 500 workers there.

== See also ==
- List of trolleybus manufacturers
- MAN SE
