= Wright Meridian =

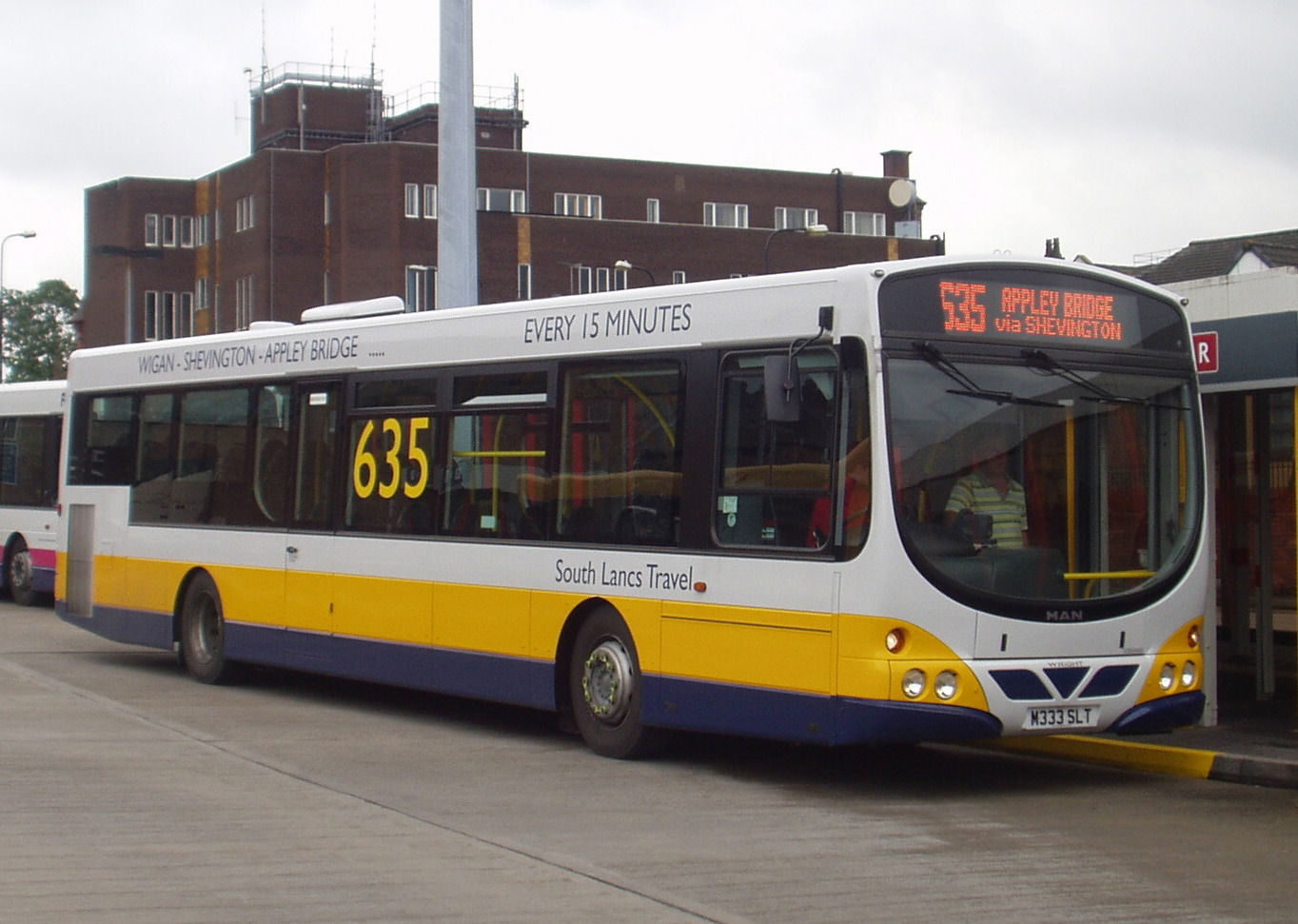
- South Lancs Travel Wright Meridian bodied MAN NL273F

Overview
- Manufacturer: Wrightbus
- Production: 2007 - 2009
- Assembly: Ballymena, Northern Ireland

Body and chassis
- Doors: 1 or 2
- Floor type: Low floor Low entry
- Chassis: MAN NL273F

Powertrain
- Engine: MAN

The Wright Meridian was a low floor single-decker bus body built on the MAN NL273F chassis by Wrightbus. The body was essentially the same as the Eclipse.

The first production vehicle was launched as a demonstrator in October 2007. It was later purchased by Whitelaw's Coaches of Stonehouse who ordered a further five. Two Meridians entered service with Newbury Buses in May 2008.

Four entered service with South Lancs Travel in April 2009, around the same time that Premiere Travel of Nottingham acquired two.
