= Carrocera Castrosua =

Bus company located in Santiago de Compostela, Spain

Carrocera Castrosua, S.A.
- Industry: Automotive
- Founded: 1948
- Founder: José Castro Suaréz
- Headquarters: Santiago de Compostela, Spain
- Products: Buses and Coaches
- Website: www.castrosua.com

Carrocera Castrosua, S.A. is a coachbuilder based in Santiago de Compostela, Spain. The production of Castrosua is focused mainly on urban and suburban transport, as well as multi-purpose coaches under the subsidiary brand Carsa.

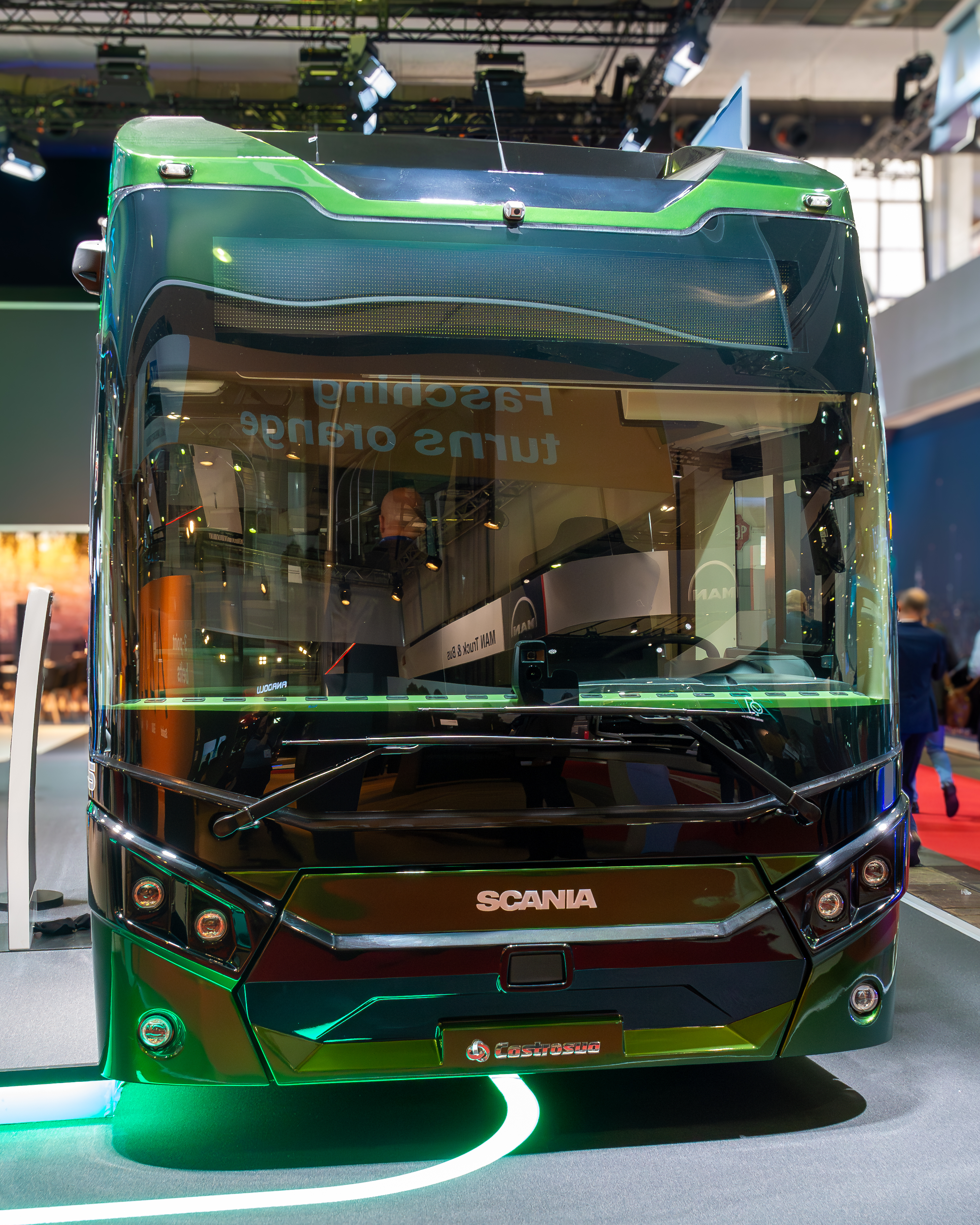
Castrosua 75CS electric bus on Scania chassis

== History ==
The first Castrosua bus started production in 1948. In the mid sixties the company grew through a series of alliances to become a major player in the national market. In 1992 they introduced the first low floor bus in the Iberian market, in 1993 the first natural gas city bus, and in 2003 the first hydrogen-powered bus, delivered to Madrid's municipal bus company EMT.
