= Pilsting =

- Municipality
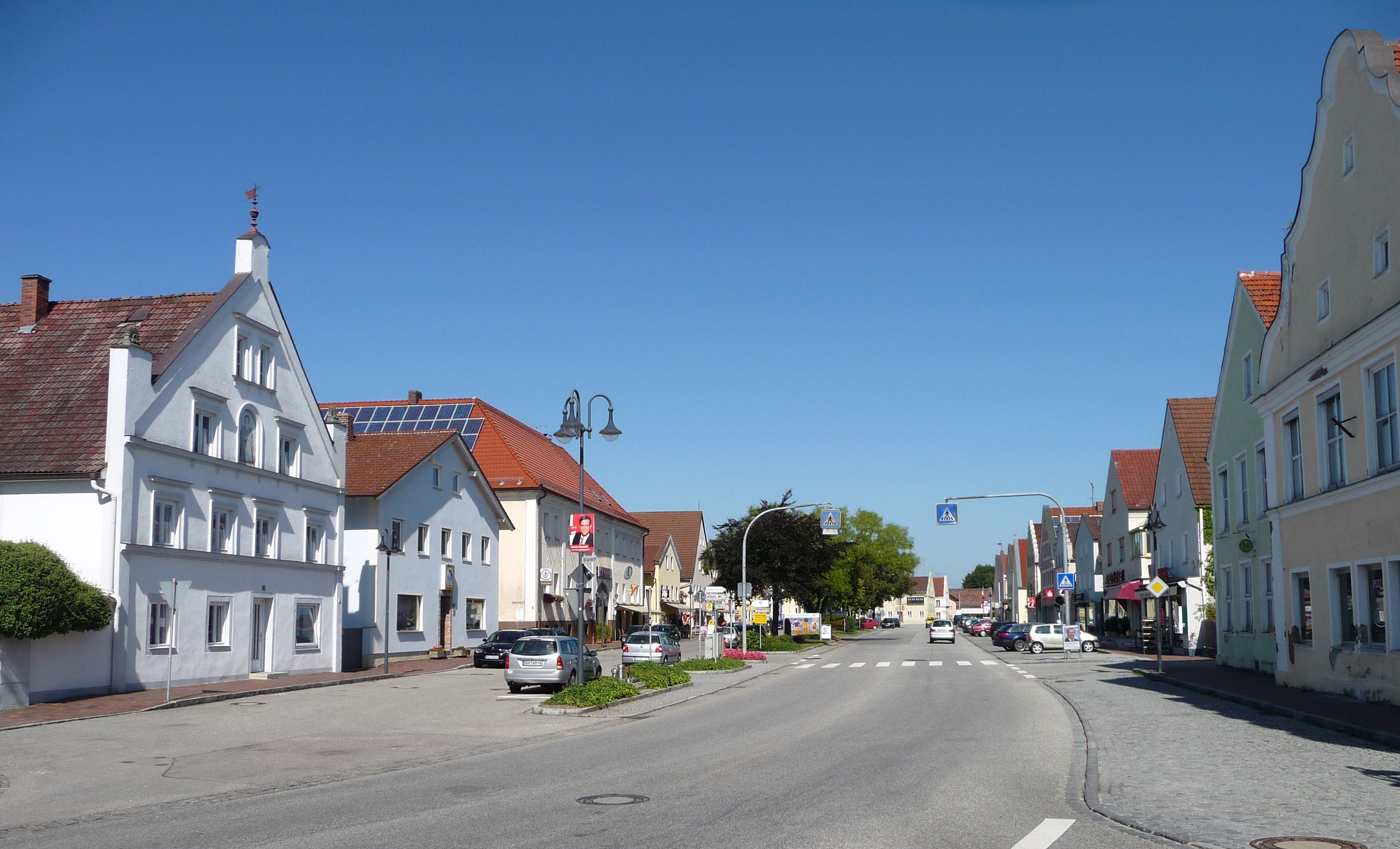
- Market square

- Coat of arms

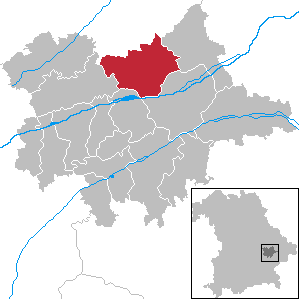
- Location of Pilsting within Dingolfing-Landau district
- Interactive map of Pilsting
- Location within Germany Location within Bavaria
- Coordinates: 48°42′N 12°39′E
- Country: Germany
- State: Bavaria
- Admin. region: Niederbayern
- District: Dingolfing-Landau

Government
  - Mayor (2020–26): Martin Hiergeist (CSU)

Area
  - Total: 71.05 km^{2} (27.43 sq mi)
- Elevation: 341 m (1,119 ft)

Population (2025-12-31)
  - Total: 7,095
  - Density: 99.86/km^{2} (258.6/sq mi)
- Time zone: UTC+01:00 (CET)
  - Summer (DST): UTC+02:00 (CEST)
- Postal codes: 94431
- Dialling codes: 09953
- Vehicle registration: DGF
- Website: www.markt-pilsting.de

Pilsting (Central Bavarian: Buisting) is a municipality in the district of Dingolfing-Landau in Bavaria in Germany.
