= Automotive industry =

Organizations involved with motor vehicles

The automotive industry comprises a wide range of companies and organisations involved in the design, development, manufacturing, marketing, selling, repairing, and modification of motor vehicles. It is one of the world's largest industries by revenue with global automotive market at ~$2.75 trillion in 2025. Companies involved in the assembly and marketing of automotive vehicles are heavily dependent on other firms in their supply chain.

== History ==
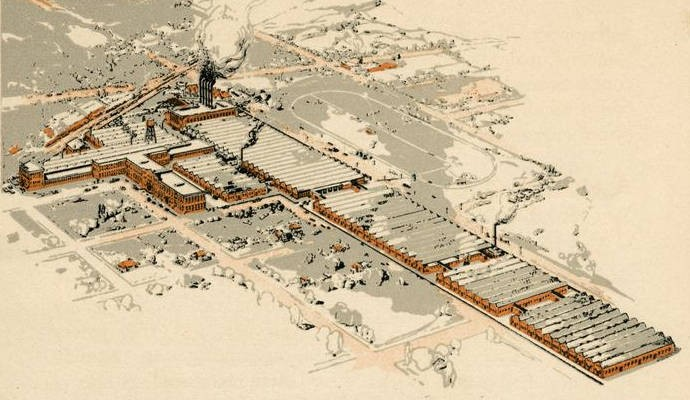
The Thomas B. Jeffery Company automobile factory in Kenosha, Wisconsin, around 1916

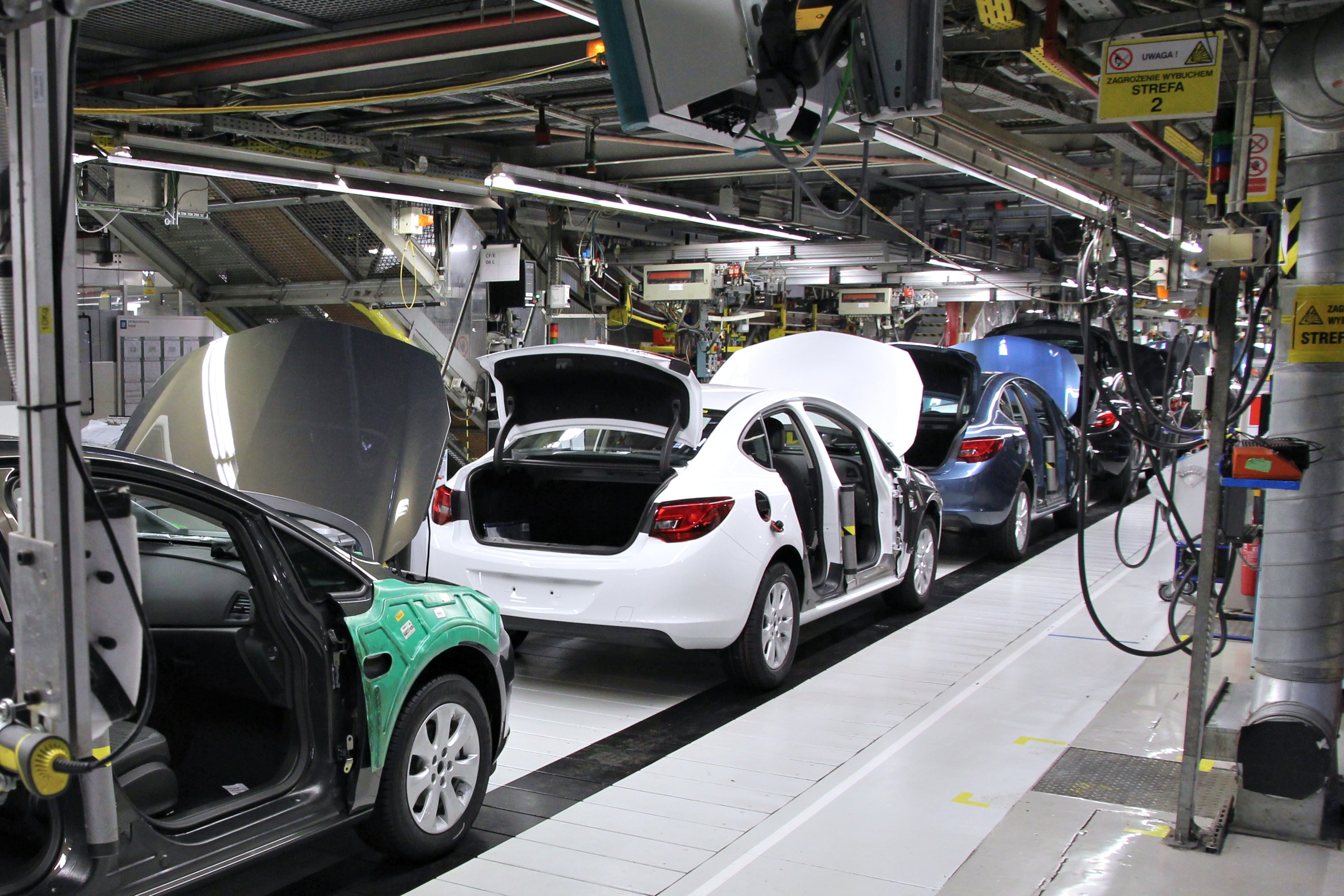
An automotive assembly line at Opel Manufacturing Poland in 2015

SEAT, Škoda, and Volkswagen cars being transported by train in Kutná Hora, Czech Republic, in 2014

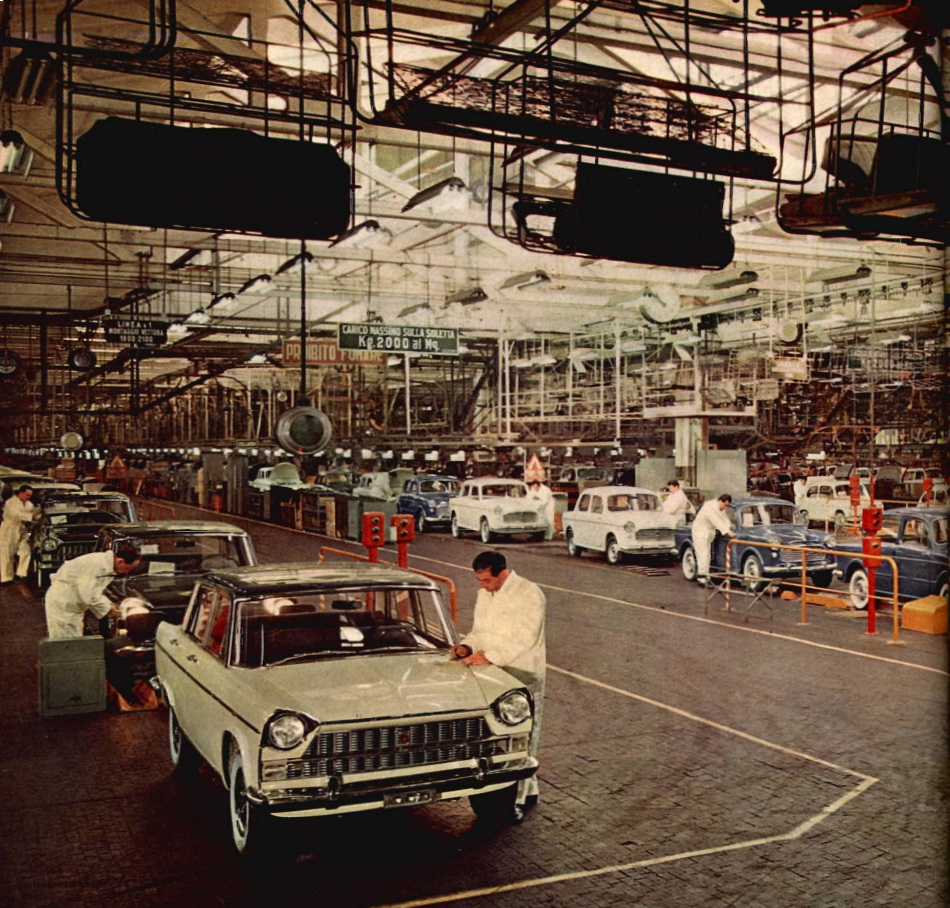
Fiat 1800 and 2100 sedans being assembled at a Fiat factory in 1961

The word automotive comes from the Greek autos (self), and Latin motivus (of motion), referring to any form of self-powered vehicle. This term, as proposed by Elmer Sperry (1860–1930), first came into use to describe automobiles in 1898.

The automotive industry began in the 1860s, with hundreds of manufacturers pioneering the horseless carriage. Early car manufacturing involved manual assembly by a human worker. The process evolved from engineers working on a stationary car to a conveyor belt system where the car passed through multiple stations of more specialised engineers. In the 1960s, robotic equipment was introduced, and most cars are now mainly assembled by automated machinery.

For many decades, the United States led the world in total automobile production, with the "Big Three" companies, General Motors, Ford, and Chrysler, being the world's three largest auto manufacturers for a time, and G.M. and Ford remaining the two largest until the mid-2000s. In 1929, before the Great Depression, the world had 32,028,500 automobiles in use, of which the U.S. automobile enterprises produced more than 90%. At that time, the U.S. had one car per 4.87 persons. After 1945, the U.S. produced around three-quarters of the world's auto production. In 1980, the U.S. was overtaken by Japan and then became a world leader again in 1994. Japan narrowly passed the U.S. in production during 2006 and 2007, and in 2008 also China, which in 2009 took the top spot (from Japan) with 13.8 million units, although the U.S. surpassed Japan in 2011, to become the second-largest automobile industry. In 2024, China produced more than 31 million vehicles in a year, after breaking 30 million in 2023, reaching 29 million for the first time in 2017 and 28 million the year before. In 2024, China produced the most passenger cars in the world, with Japan, India, Germany, and South Korea trailing. This was achieved by Chinese car companies signing joint ventures with foreign manufacturers. From 1970 (140 models) to 1998 (260 models) to 2012 (684 models), the number of automobile models in the U.S. has grown nearly twofold. As of 2026, China releases 542 new models (road legal, production cars) every six months.

During the 2020s, European automakers faced increasing competition from Chinese manufacturers, particularly in the electric vehicle market, while adapting to the EU's planned phase-out of new fossil-fuel vehicles by 2035. Chinese brands such as BYD expanded their presence in Europe, while European manufacturers faced the costs of transitioning to electric vehicles. Volkswagen Group and other major European manufacturers responded with restructuring measures amid weak profitability and growing competition.

== Safety ==
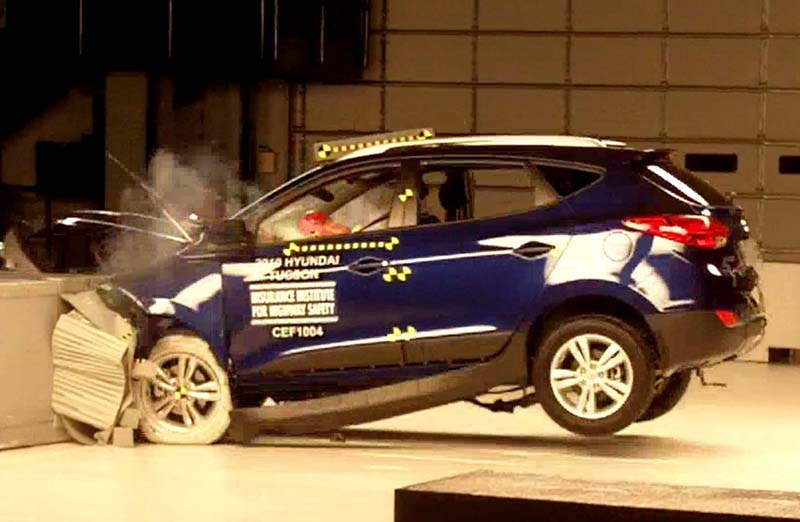
A 2010 Hyundai Tucson used for a crash test by the Insurance Institute for Highway Safety

Safety is a state that implies being protected from any risk, danger, damage, or cause of injury. In the automotive industry, safety means that users, operators, or manufacturers do not face any risk or danger coming from the motor vehicle or its spare parts. Safety for the automobiles themselves implies that there is no risk of damage.

Safety in the automotive industry is particularly important and therefore highly regulated. Automobiles and other motor vehicles have to comply with a certain number of regulations, whether local or international, in order to be accepted on the market. The standard ISO 26262, is considered one of the best practice frameworks for achieving automotive functional safety.

In case of safety issues, danger, product defect, or faulty procedure during the manufacturing of the motor vehicle, the maker can request to return either a batch or the entire production run. This procedure is called product recall. Product recalls happen in every industry and can be production-related or stem from raw materials.

Product and operation tests and inspections at different stages of the value chain are made to avoid these product recalls by ensuring end-user security and safety and compliance with the automotive industry requirements. However, the automotive industry is still particularly concerned about product recalls, which cause considerable financial consequences.

== Economy ==
An advertisement for the Pontiac 6, c. 1928

In 2007, there were about 806 million cars and light trucks on the road, consuming over 980 billion litres (980,000,000 m^{3}) of petrol and diesel fuel yearly. The automobile is a primary mode of transportation for many developed economies. The Detroit branch of Boston Consulting Group predicted that, by 2014, one-third of world demand would be in the four BRIC markets (Brazil, Russia, India, and China). Meanwhile, in developed countries, the automotive industry has slowed. It is also expected that this trend will continue, especially as the younger generations of people (in highly urbanised countries) no longer want to own a car, and prefer other modes of transport. Other potentially powerful automotive markets are Iran and Indonesia. Emerging automobile markets already buy more cars than established markets. The industry's expansion has also led to specialised academic programs in automotive marketing and dealership management; for example, Northwood University in Michigan hosts the annual Northwood University International Auto Show, which is the largest student-run outdoor automotive exhibition in North America.

According to a J.D. Power study, emerging markets accounted for 51 percent of the global light-vehicle sales in 2010. The study, performed in 2010 expected this trend to accelerate. However, more recent reports (2012) confirmed the opposite; namely that the automotive industry was slowing down even in BRIC countries. In the United States, vehicle sales peaked in 2000, at 17.8 million units.

In July 2021, the European Commission released its "Fit for 55" legislation package, which contains important guidelines for the future of the automotive industry; all new cars on the European market must be zero-emission vehicles from 2035.

The governments of 24 developed countries and a group of major car manufacturers including General Motors, Ford, Volvo, BYD, Jaguar Land Rover and Mercedes-Benz committed to "work towards all sales of new cars and vans being zero emission globally by 2040, and by no later than 2035 in leading markets". Major car manufacturing nations like the United States, Germany, China, Japan and South Korea, as well as Volkswagen, Toyota, Peugeot, Honda, Nissan and Hyundai, did not pledge.

== Environmental impacts ==
Trucks' share of US vehicles produced, has tripled since 1975. Though vehicle fuel efficiency has increased within each category, the overall trend toward less efficient types of vehicles has offset some of the benefits of greater fuel economy and reduction of carbon dioxide emissions. Without the shift towards SUVs, energy use per unit distance could have fallen 30% more than it did from 2010 to 2022.

The global automotive industry is a major consumer of water. Some estimates surpass 180,000 L (39,000 imp gal) of water per car manufactured, depending on whether tyre production is included. Production processes that use a significant volume of water include surface treatment, painting, coating, washing, cooling, air-conditioning, and boilers, not counting component manufacturing. Paintshop operations consume especially large amounts of water because equipment running on water-based products must also be cleaned with water.

In 2022, Tesla's Gigafactory Berlin-Brandenburg ran into legal challenges due to droughts and falling groundwater levels in the region. Brandenburg's Economy Minister Joerg Steinbach said that while water supply was sufficient during the first stage, more would be needed once Tesla expands the site. The factory would nearly double the water consumption in the Gruenheide area, with 1.4 million cubic meters being contracted from local authorities per year — enough for a city of around 40,000 people. Steinbach said that the authorities would like to drill for more water there and outsource any additional supply if necessary.

Road transport is a major source of greenhouse gas emissions, with passenger cars and vans accounting for more than 60% of road transport emissions globally. Automakers have responded to increasingly stringent emissions standards and environmental policies by improving fuel efficiency and developing hybrid and electric vehicles. However, the industry has also faced controversy over emissions testing, most notably the Dieselgate scandal that began in 2015 when Volkswagen was found to have used software to manipulate emissions tests; subsequent investigations and legal proceedings also implicated other manufacturers.

The expansion of electric vehicles has also increased demand for battery minerals such as lithium, nickel and cobalt, whose extraction can cause local environmental damage, including deforestation, habitat destruction and water pollution. In the Democratic Republic of the Congo, a major source of cobalt, mining has contributed to environmental degradation, while nickel mining has been associated with deforestation and pollution in countries such as Indonesia and the Philippines.

== World motor vehicle production ==
World motor vehicle production

Production volume (1000 vehicles)

1960s: Post-war increase

1970s: Oil crisis and tighter safety and emission regulation

1990s: Production started in NICs.

2000s: Rise of China as a top producer

Automotive industry crisis of 2008–2010

To 1950: US had produced more than 80% of motor vehicles.

1950s: United Kingdom, Germany, and France restarted production.

1960s: Japan started expanding production and increased volume through the 1980s. United States, Japan, Germany, France, and the United Kingdom produced about 80% of motor vehicles through the 1980s.

1990s: South Korea became a volume producer. In 2004, Korea became No. 5 passing France.

2000s: China increased its production drastically, and became the world's largest-producing country in 2009.

2010s: India overtakes Korea, Canada, Spain to become 5th largest automobile producer.

2013: The share of China (25.4%), India, Korea, Brazil, and Mexico rose to 43%, while the share of United States (12.7%), Japan, Germany, France, and United Kingdom fell to 34%.

2018: India overtakes Germany to become 4th largest automobile producer.

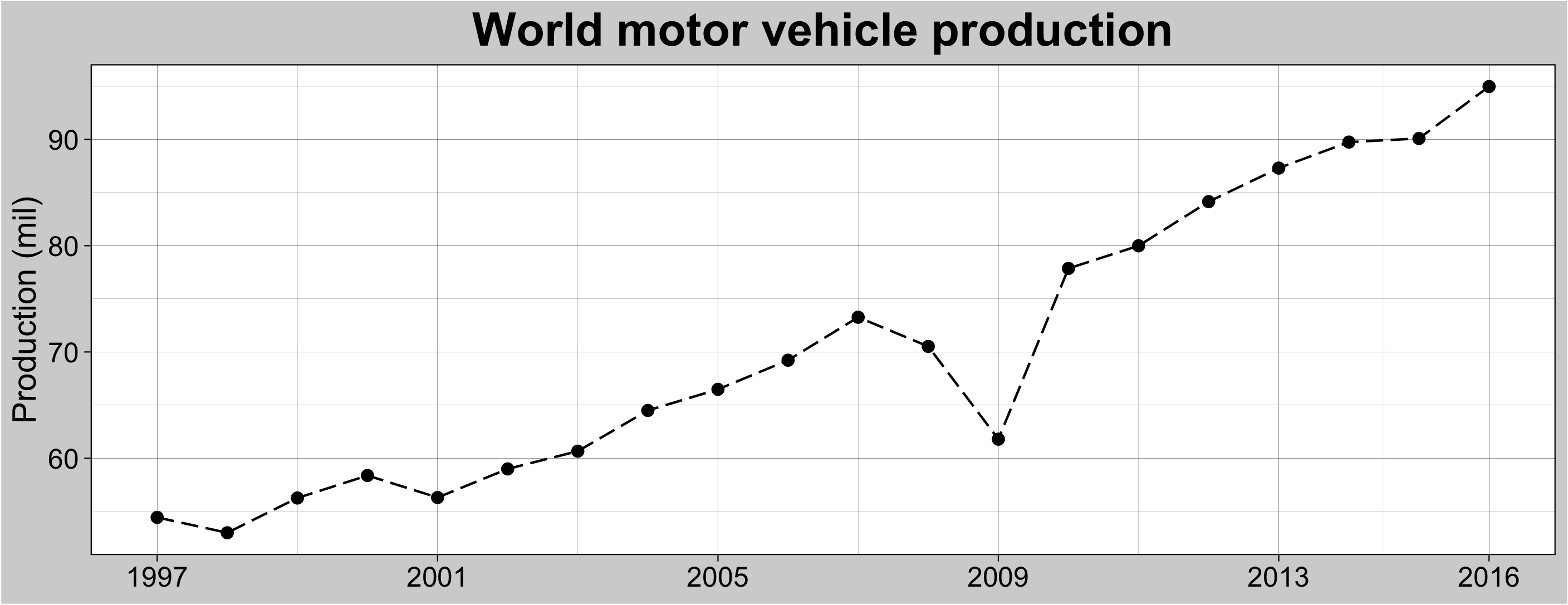
World motor production (1997–2016)

=== By year ===
World motor vehicle production by year
| Year | Production | Change |
|---|---|---|
| 1997 | 54,434,000 | — |
| 1998 | 52,987,000 | ▼2.7% |
| 1999 | 56,258,892 | ▲6.2% |
| 2000 | 58,374,162 | ▲3.8% |
| 2001 | 56,304,925 | ▼3.5% |
| 2002 | 58,994,318 | ▲4.8% |
| 2003 | 60,663,225 | ▲2.8% |
| 2004 | 64,496,220 | ▲6.3% |
| 2005 | 66,482,439 | ▲3.1% |
| 2006 | 69,222,975 | ▲4.1% |
| 2007 | 73,266,061 | ▲5.8% |
| 2008 | 70,520,493 | ▼3.7% |
| 2009 | 61,791,868 | ▼12.4% |
| 2010 | 77,857,705 | ▲26.0% |
| 2011 | 79,989,155 | ▲3.1% |
| 2012 | 84,141,209 | ▲5.3% |
| 2013 | 87,300,115 | ▲3.7% |
| 2014 | 89,747,430 | ▲2.6% |
| 2015 | 90,086,346 | ▲0.4% |
| 2016 | 94,976,569 | ▲4.5% |
| 2017 | 97,302,534 | ▲2.36% |
| 2018 | 95,634,593 | ▼1.71% |
| 2019 | 91,786,861 | ▼5.2% |
| 2020 | 77,621,582 | ▼16% |
| 2021 | 80,145,988 | ▲3.25% |
| 2022 | 85,016,728 | ▲6.08% |

=== By country ===
The OICA counts over 50 countries that assemble, manufacture, or disseminate automobiles. Of those, only 15 countries (boldfaced in the list below) currently possess the capability to design original production automobiles from the ground up, and 17 countries (listed below) have at least one million produced vehicles a year (as of 2023).

- Algeria
- Argentina
- **Australia** (main page)
- Austria
- Azerbaijan
- Bangladesh (main page)
- Belarus (main page)
- Belgium
- Brazil (main page)
- Bulgaria (main page)
- Canada (main page)
- **China** (main page)
- Colombia
- Czech Republic (main page)
- Ecuador
- Egypt (main page)
- Finland
- **France** (main page)
- Ghana (main page)
- **Germany** (main page)
- Hungary (main page)
- **India** (main page)
- Indonesia (main page)
- **Iran** (main page)
- **Italy** (main page)
- **Japan** (main page)
- Jordan
- Kazakhstan
- Kenya (main page)
- **Republic of Korea (South Korea)** (main page)
- **Malaysia** (main page)
- Mexico (main page)
- Morocco (main page)
- Netherlands
- Pakistan (main page)
- Philippines (main page)
- Poland (main page)
- Portugal
- Romania (main page)
- **Russia** (main page)
- Serbia (main page)
- Slovakia (main page)
- Slovenia
- South Africa (main page)
- Spain (main page)
- **Sweden** (main page)
- Syria
- Thailand (main page)
- Tunisia
- Turkey (main page)
- Ukraine (main page)
- **United Kingdom** (main page)
- **United States** (main page)
- Uzbekistan (main page)
- Venezuela
- Vietnam (main page)

| Country | Vehicles produced in 2025 |
|---|---|
| China | 34,530,738 |
| United States | 10,243,844 |
| Japan | 8,410,232 |
| India | 6,490,810 |
| Germany | 4,322,305 |
| South Korea | 4,102,200 |
| Mexico | 4,092,448 |
| Brazil | 2,644,054 |
| Spain | 2,274,026 |
| France | 1,529,229 |
| Thailand | 1,455,569 |
| Czechia | 1,452,776 |
| Turkey | 1,419,464 |
| Canada | 1,237,075 |
| Indonesia | 1,147,600 |
| Slovakia | 1,070,000 |

Figures include passenger cars and commercial vehicles.

=== By manufacturer ===
==== Top 10 (2016–2020) ====
These were the ten largest manufacturers by production volume as of 2017, of which the eight largest were in the top 8 positions since Fiat's 2013 acquisition of the Chrysler Corporation (although the PSA Group had been in the top 8 1999 to 2012, and 2007 to 2012 one of the eight largest along with the seven largest as of 2017) and the five largest in the top 5 positions since 2007, according to OICA, which, however, stopped publishing statistics of motor vehicle production by manufacturer after 2017. All ten remained as the ten largest car makers by sales until the merger between Fiat-Chrysler and the PSA Group in early 2021; only Renault was degraded to 11th place, in 2022, when being surpassed by both BMW (which became the 10th largest in 2021) and Chang'an.

| Rank (Note: As of 2017) | Group | Country | Produced vehicles (2017) | Sold vehicles (2018) | Sold vehicles (2019) |
|---|---|---|---|---|---|
| 1 | Toyota | Japan | 10,466,051 | 10,521,134 | 10,741,556 |
| 2 | Volkswagen Group | Germany | 10,382,334 | 10,831,232 | 10,975,352 |
| 3 | General Motors (except SAIC-GM-Wuling) (Note: OICA lists SAIC-GM-Wuling combined with G.M. until 2014 but separately from 2015. Including SAIC-GM-Wuling, G.M. would still be larger than Hyundai until 2020.) | United States | 9,027,658 (6,856,880) | 8,787,233 | 7,724,163 |
| 4 | Hyundai | South Korea | 7,218,391 | 7,437,209 | 7,189,893 |
| 5 | Ford | United States | 6,386,818 | 5,734,217 | 5,385,972 |
| 6 | Nissan | Japan | 5,769,277 | 5,653,743 | 5,176,211 |
| 7 | Honda | Japan | 5,235,842 | 5,265,892 | 5,323,319 |
| 8 | Fiat-Chrysler (now part of Stellantis) | Italy / United States | 4,600,847 | 4,841,366 | 4,612,673 |
| 9 | Renault | France | 4,153,589 | 3,883,987 | 3,749,815 |
| 10 | PSA Group (now part of Stellantis) | France | 3,649,742 | 4,126,349 | 3,479,152 |

==== Top 20 (2012–2013) ====
These were the twenty largest manufacturers by production volume in 2012 and 2013, or the 21 largest in 2011 (before the Fiat-Chrysler merger), of which the fourteen largest as of 2011 were in the top 14 in 2010, 2008 and 2007 (but not 2009, when Changan and Mazda temporarily degraded Chrysler to 16th place). The eighteen largest as of 2013 have remained in the top 20 as of 2017, except Mitsubishi which fell out of top 20 in 2016, while Geely fell out of the top 20 in 2014 and 2015 but re-entered it in 2016.

| Rank (Note: As of 2012) | Group | Country | Produced vehicles (2013) | Produced vehicles (2012) | Produced vehicles (2011) |
|---|---|---|---|---|---|
| 1 | Toyota | Japan | 10,324,995 | 10,104,424 | 8,050,181 |
| 2 | General Motors | United States | 9,628,912 | 9,285,425 | 9,031,670 |
| 3 | Volkswagen Group | Germany | 9,379,229 | 9,254,742 | 8,525,573 |
| 4 | Hyundai | South Korea | 7,233,080 | 7,126,413 | 6,616,858 |
| 5 | Ford | United States | 6,077,126 | 5,595,483 | 5,516,931 |
| 6 | Nissan | Japan | 4,950,924 | 4,889,379 | 4,631,673 |
| 7 | Fiat / FCA | Italy | 4,681,704 | 4 498 722 (Note: Fiat acquired Chrysler in 2012. However, Fiat and Chrysler was still listed separately by OICA in 2012, and combined first from 2013. Separately, the production by Fiat was 2,127,295 and by Chrysler 2,371,427.) | 2,336,954 |
| 8 | Honda | Japan | 4,298,390 | 4,110,857 | 2,909,016 |
| 9 | PSA Peugeot Citroën | France | 2,833,781 | 2,911,764 | 3,582,410 |
| 10 | Suzuki | Japan | 2,842,133 | 2,893,602 | 2,725,899 |
| 11 | Renault | France | 2,704,675 | 2,676,226 | 2,825,089 |
| 12 | Daimler | Germany | 1,781,507 | 2,195,152 | 2,137,067 |
| | Chrysler | United States | part of FCA | part of FCA | 1,999,017 |
| 13 | BMW | Germany | 2,006,366 | 2,065,477 | 1,738,160 |
| 14 | SAIC | China | 1,992,250 | 1,783,548 | 1,478,502 |
| 15 | Tata | India | 1,062,654 | 1,241,239 | 1,197,192 |
| 16 | Mazda | Japan | 1,264,173 | 1,189,283 | 1,165,591 |
| 17 | Dongfeng | China | 1,238,948 | 1,137,950 | 1,108,949 |
| 18 | Mitsubishi | Japan | 1,229,441 | 1,109,731 | 1,140,282 |
| 19 | Changan | China | 1,109,889 | 1,063,721 | 1,167,208 |
| 20 | Geely | China | 969,896 | 922,906 | 897,107 |

== Inter-company relationships ==
=== Stakes ===
The following tables list automobile manufacturers that have stakes in other car makers:

| Entity held | Stake held (%) | Voting rights (%) | Stake owner | Reference |
|---|---|---|---|---|
| Perodua | 25 | | Daihatsu | |
| Daimler Truck | 30.01 | | Mercedes-Benz Group | |
| Daimler Truck | 6.49 | | BAIC Group | |
| Fuso | 89.29 | | Daimler Truck | |
| BAIC Group | 12 | | Mercedes-Benz Group | |
| Mercedes-Benz Group | 5 | | BAIC Group | |
| Mercedes-Benz Group | 9.69 | | Geely Holding Group | |
| PSA Group | 12.23 | 19.94 | Dongfeng Motor | |
| Haima Automobile | 49 | | FAW Group | |
| FCA Srbija | 67 | | Stellantis | |
| Tofaş | 37.8 | | FCA | |
| Tofaş | 37.8 | | Koç Holding | |
| Zastava Trucks | 54 | | Fiat Automobili Srbija | |
| Zastava Trucks | 46 | | Fiat Industrial | |
| King Long | 15 | | Fujian Motors Group | |
| London EV Company | 23 | | Geely Automobile | |
| Proton Holdings | 49.9 | | Geely Automobile | |
| Lotus Cars | 51 | | Geely Automobile | |
| Volvo | 8.3 | 15.9 | Geely Holding Group | |
| Industries Mécaniques Maghrébines | 20 | | General Motors | |
| Industries Mécaniques Maghrébines | 10 | | Isuzu | |
| New Flyer Industries | 19 | | Marcopolo | |
| Nissan Shatai | 43 | | Nissan | |
| Volkswagen Group | | 53.3 | Porsche SE | |
| AvtoVAZ | 32.39 | | Rostec | |
| AvtoVAZ | 67.61 | | Central Research and Development Automobile and Engine Institute | |
| Renault Korea | 52.8 | | Renault | |
| Pars Khodro | 51 | | SAIPA | |
| Jaguar Land Rover | 100 | | Tata Motors | |
| Daihatsu | 100 | | Toyota | |
| Hino | 100 | | Toyota | |
| Isuzu | 4.6 | | Toyota | |
| Mazda | 5.05 | | Toyota | |
| Subaru Corporation | 16.7 | | Toyota | |
| Suzuki | 4.94 | | Toyota | |
| Toyota | 0.25 | | Mazda | |
| Toyota | 0.2 | | Suzuki | |
| Audi Group | 99.55 | | Volkswagen Group | |
| Scania | 37.73 | 68.6 | Volkswagen Group | |
| MAN SE | 53.7 | 55.9 | Volkswagen Group | |
| Tatra | 19 | | Paccar | |
| Zhejiang Jonway | 51 | | ZAP | |

Renault-Nissan-Mitsubishi Alliance
| Entity held | Stake held (%) | Voting rights (%) | Stake owner | Owner parent | Reference |
|---|---|---|---|---|---|
| Nissan | 43.4 | | Renault | | |
| Renault | 15 | | Nissan | | |
| Mitsubishi Motors | 24 | | Nissan | | |

Mercedes-Benz Group held a combined 6.2% stake in the Renault–Nissan–Mitsubishi Alliance, and the Renault-Nissan-Mitsubishi Alliance also held a combined 6.2% stake in Mercedes-Benz Group until 2021.

=== Joint Ventures ===
| Name | Stakes held (%) | Stake owners | Reference |
|---|---|---|---|
| Blue Diamond Truck | 50 | Ford | |
| Blue Diamond Truck | 50 | International Motors | |
| Ford Sollers | 50 | Ford | |
| Ford Sollers | 50 | Sollers JSC | |
| Ford Otosan | 50 | Ford | |
| Ford Otosan | 50 | Koç Holding | |
| Ford Lio Ho | 70 | Ford | |
| Ford Lio Ho | 30 | Lio Ho Group | |
| GM Uzbekistan | 25 | General Motors | |
| GM Uzbekistan | 75 | UzAvtosanoat | |
| GM-AvtoVAZ | 41.61 | GM | |
| GM-AvtoVAZ | 41.61 | AvtoVAZ | |
| GM-AvtoVAZ | 16.76 | EBRD | |
| Hyundai Assan Otomotiv | 70 | Hyundai Motor Company | |
| Hyundai Assan Otomotiv | 30 | Kibar Holding | |
| Anadolu Isuzu | 50 | Isuzu | |
| Anadolu Isuzu | 50 | Anadolu Group | |
| Isuzu Truck South Africa | 50 | Isuzu | |
| Isuzu Truck South Africa | 50 | General Motors | |
| Sollers-Isuzu | 29 | Isuzu | |
| Sollers-Isuzu | 66 | Sollers JSC | |
| Sollers-Isuzu | 5 | Imperial Sojitz | |
| Mahindra Trucks and Buses Limited | 51 | Mahindra & Mahindra | |
| Mahindra Trucks and Buses Limited | 49 | International Motors | |
| MAN Auto-Uzbekistan | 49 | MAN SE | |
| MAN Auto-Uzbekistan | 51 | UzAvtosanoat | |
| PSA AVTEC Powertrain Pvt. Ltd. | 50 | PSA | |
| PSA AVTEC Powertrain Pvt. Ltd. | 50 | CK Birla Group (AVTEC) | |
| Ford Sollers | | Sollers JSC | |
| Ford Sollers | | Ford | |
| Ford Sollers | | Mazda | |
| | | Tata Motors | |
| | | Fiat | |
| Tata Marcopolo | 51 | Tata Motors | |
| Tata Marcopolo | 49 | Marcopolo | |
| VE Commercial Vehicles | 50 | Volvo | |
| VE Commercial Vehicles | 50 | Eicher Motors | |

==== China ====
Until 2022, China required foreign automotive firms to form joint ventures in order to access their market. The policy led to quality improvement across the industry.

| Name | Stakes held (%) | Stake owners | Reference |
|---|---|---|---|
| Fujian Benz | | FMG | |
| Fujian Benz | | Beijing Automotive Group | |
| Fujian Benz | | China Motor | |
| Fujian Benz | | Mercedes-Benz Group | |
| Soueast | 50 | FMG | |
| Soueast | 25 | China Motor | |
| Soueast | 25 | Mitsubishi Motors | |
| Beijing Benz | 50 | Beijing Automotive Group | |
| Beijing Benz | 50 | Mercedes-Benz Group | |
| Beijing Foton Daimler Automobile | | Beijing Automotive Group | |
| Beijing Foton Daimler Automobile | | Mercedes-Benz Group | |
| Beijing Hyundai | 50 | Beijing Automotive Group | |
| Beijing Hyundai | 50 | Hyundai | |
| BMW Brilliance | 50 | BMW | |
| BMW Brilliance | 40.5 | Brilliance | |
| BMW Brilliance | 9.5 | Shenyang municipal government | |
| Changan PSA | 50 | Changan Automobile | |
| Changan PSA | 50 | PSA Group | |
| Changan Suzuki | 50 | Changan Automobile | |
| Changan Suzuki | 50 | Suzuki | |
| Changan Mazda | 50 | Changan Automobile | |
| Changan Mazda | 50 | Mazda | |
| Changan Ford | 50 | Changan Automobile | |
| Changan Ford | 50 | Ford | |
| Jiangling Motor Holding | | Changan Automobile | |
| Jiangling Motor Holding | | JMCG | |
| Chery Jaguar Land Rover | 50 | Chery | |
| Chery Jaguar Land Rover | 50 | Jaguar Land Rover | |
| Qoros | 50 | Chery | |
| Qoros | 50 | Israel Corporation | |
| Dongfeng Motor Company | 50 | Dongfeng Motor Corporation | |
| Dongfeng Motor Company | 50 | Nissan | |
| Denza | 50 | Mercedes-Benz Group | |
| Denza | 50 | BYD Auto | |
| smart Automobile | 50 | Mercedes-Benz Group | |
| smart Automobile | 50 | Geely Holding Group | |
| Dongfeng Peugeot-Citroën | 50 | Dongfeng Motor | |
| Dongfeng Peugeot-Citroën | 50 | Stellantis (Note: until 2021) | |
| Dongfeng Honda | 50 | Dongfeng Motor | |
| Dongfeng Honda | 50 | Honda | |
| Dongfeng Renault | 50 | Dongfeng Motor | |
| Dongfeng Renault | 50 | Renault | |
| FAW-GM | 50 | FAW Group | |
| FAW-GM | 50 | General Motors | |
| FAW-Volkswagen | 50 | FAW Group | |
| FAW-Volkswagen | 50 | Volkswagen Group | |
| Sichuan FAW Toyota Motor | 50 | FAW Group | |
| Sichuan FAW Toyota Motor | 50 | Toyota | |
| Ranz | | FAW Group | |
| Ranz | | Toyota | |
| SAIC-GM | | General Motors | |
| SAIC-GM | | SAIC Motor | |
| SAIC-GM-Wuling | | General Motors | |
| SAIC-GM-Wuling | | SAIC Motor | |
| SAIC-GM-Wuling | | Wuling Motors | |
| Anhui Jianghuai Navistar | | Navistar International | |
| Anhui Jianghuai Navistar | | JAC | |

==== Dissolved ====
| Name | Stakes held (%) | Stake owners | Reference |
|---|---|---|---|
| Dongfeng Nissan-Diesel | | Dongfeng Motor | |
| Dongfeng Nissan-Diesel | | Volvo | |
| Toyota Peugeot Citroën Automobile Czech | 50 | PSA | |
| Toyota Peugeot Citroën Automobile Czech | 50 | Toyota | |

== See also ==
- 2008–2010 automotive industry crisis
- Alliance of Automobile Manufacturers
- Automotive industry by country
- Automotive industry in the United States
- Big Three (automobile manufacturers)
- Effects of the 2008–10 automotive industry crisis on the United States
- List of countries by motor vehicle production
- Automotive acronyms and abbreviations
- Motocycle
