= Automotive industry in Kenya =

The Automotive industry in Kenya is primarily involved in the assembly, retail and distribution of motor vehicles. There are a number of motor vehicle dealers operating in the country.

== Local automotive companies ==
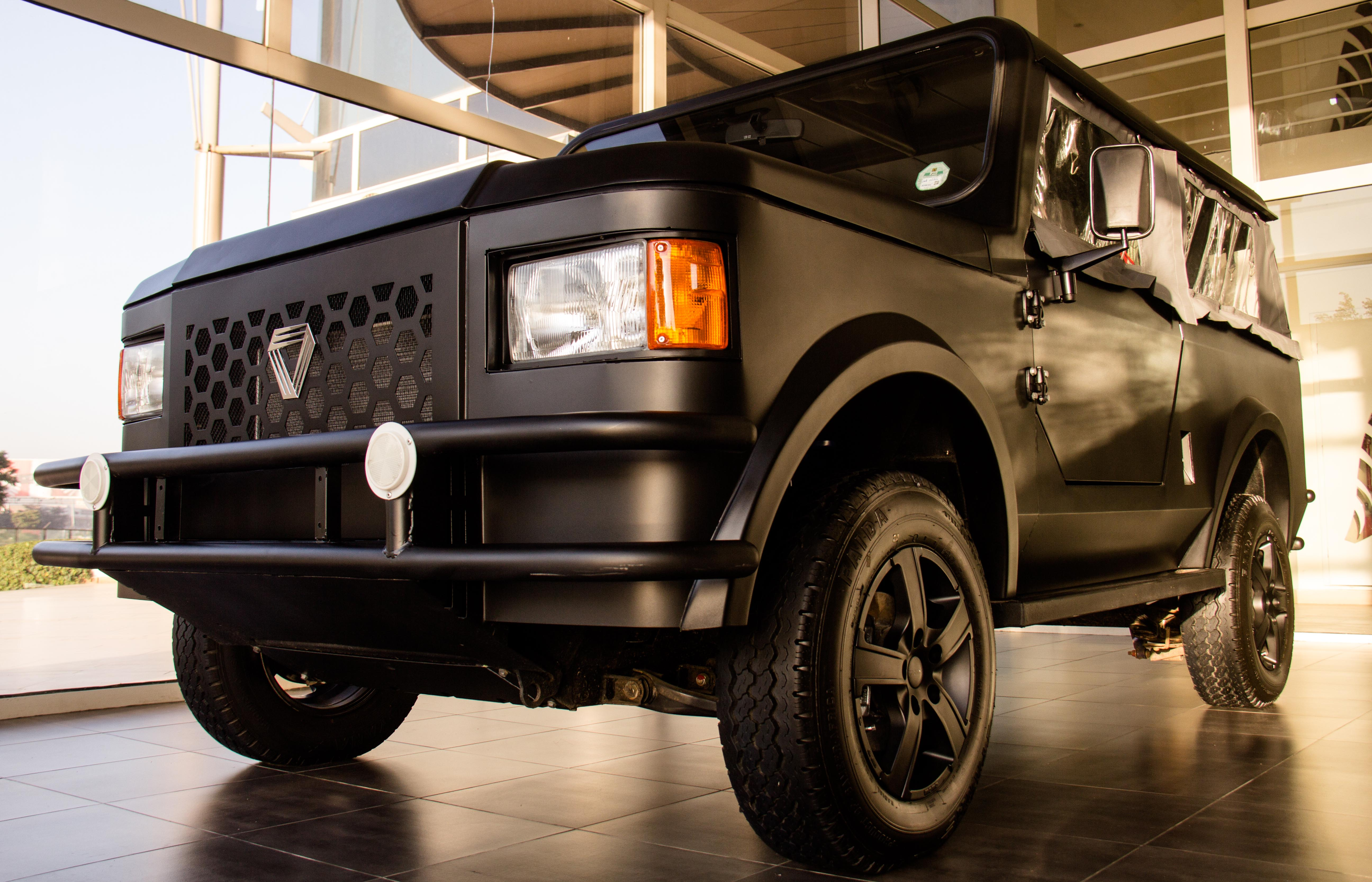
Mobius II

Kenya is currently attempting to completely build its own cars. After building its first car in the late 80's (the Nyayo Car), Kenya has a shot at the industry with Mobius Motors, which was founded in 2009. with KIBO Africa Limited, motorcycles have been rolling out from this local manufacturer.

=== Nyayo ===
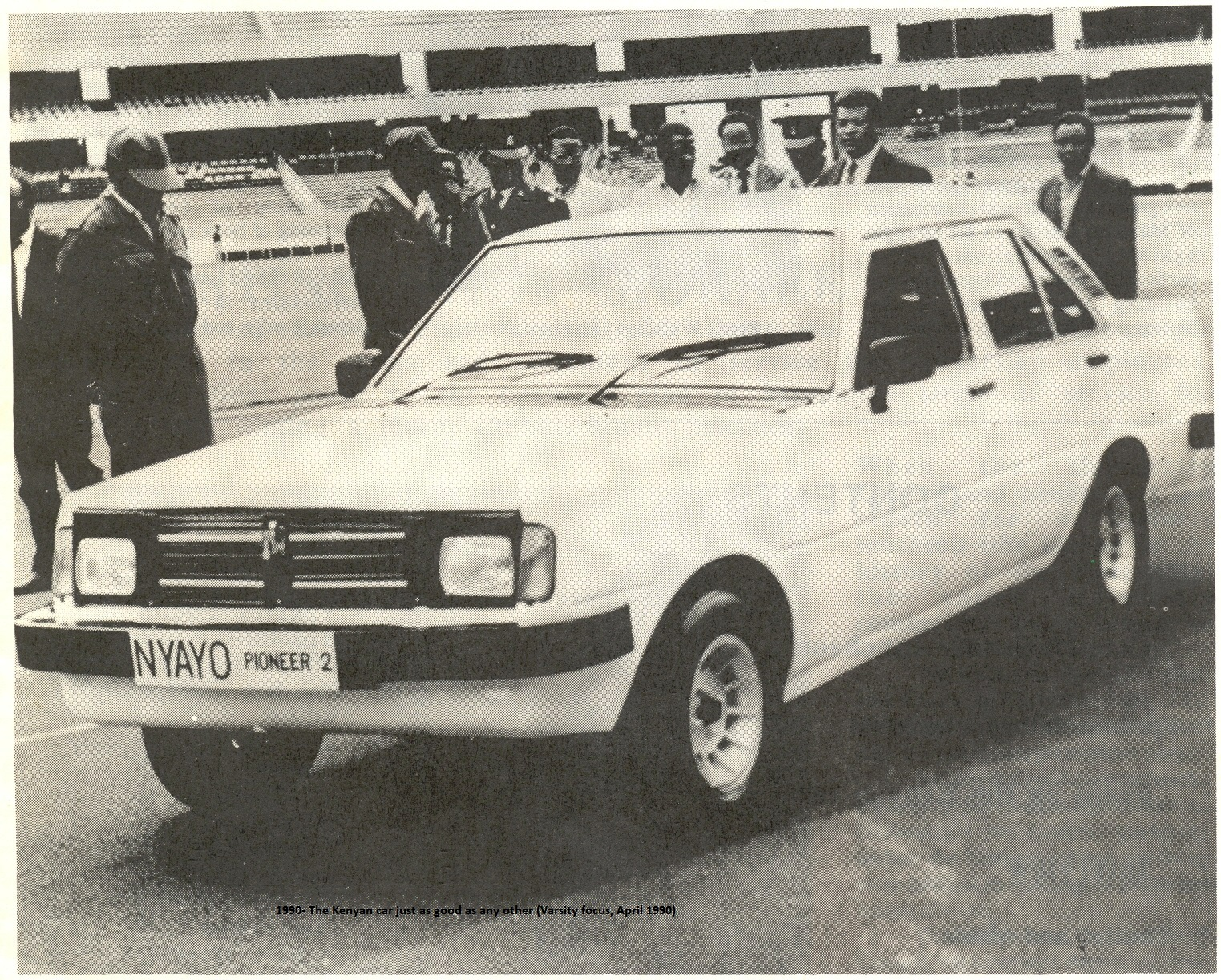
Nyayo Pioneer (1990)

The Nyayo Car was a project made by the Kenyan government to plan and manufacture Kenyan cars. The project was initiated in 1986 when then president Daniel arap Moi asked the University of Nairobi to develop these vehicles.

Five prototypes were made, they were known as the Pioneer Nyayo Cars and they could achieve a top speed of up to 120 km/h. The Nyayo Motor Corporation was established to mass-produce these cars. However, due to a lack of funds, the car never entered production.

The Nyayo Motor Corporation was later renamed to Numerical Machining Complex Limited, manufacturing metal parts for various local industries. The car became a synonym for the many white elephants that signified the government of the day.

=== Mobius Motors ===

Mobius Motors Kenya Limited was a vehicle re-assembler founded in 2010. The company was incorporated in the United Kingdom in 2010 and registered in Kenya in 2011. As of 2018, the company was in the process of building an in country manufacturing plant. On 5 August 2024, the shareholders' meeting that convened in Nairobi, Kenya resolved to liquidate the company and selected SVSK Sastry as the liquidator.

The company manufactured SUVs (sport utility vehicles) designed to handle the rough roads and rugged terrain found in many parts of regional Africa.

== Challenges ==
The established dealers face intense competition from imported second-hand vehicles, mainly from Japan and United Arab Emirates. Another issue is that there is more demand for second-hand vehicles rather than new ones because Kenya is generally a lower middle-income country. Thus, Mobius Motors was established to provide low cost cars at about KES. 1,100,000 (US$11,000).

In the beginning of 2019, the Government of Kenya proposed to implement a National Automotive Policy which effectively would see an eventual ban on imports of second hand passenger and commercial vehicles. However, this was faced with stiff resistance from the used car industry with the government eventually having to suspend their push to change the regulations on 7 May 2019.

== Timeline of the Kenyan car industry ==
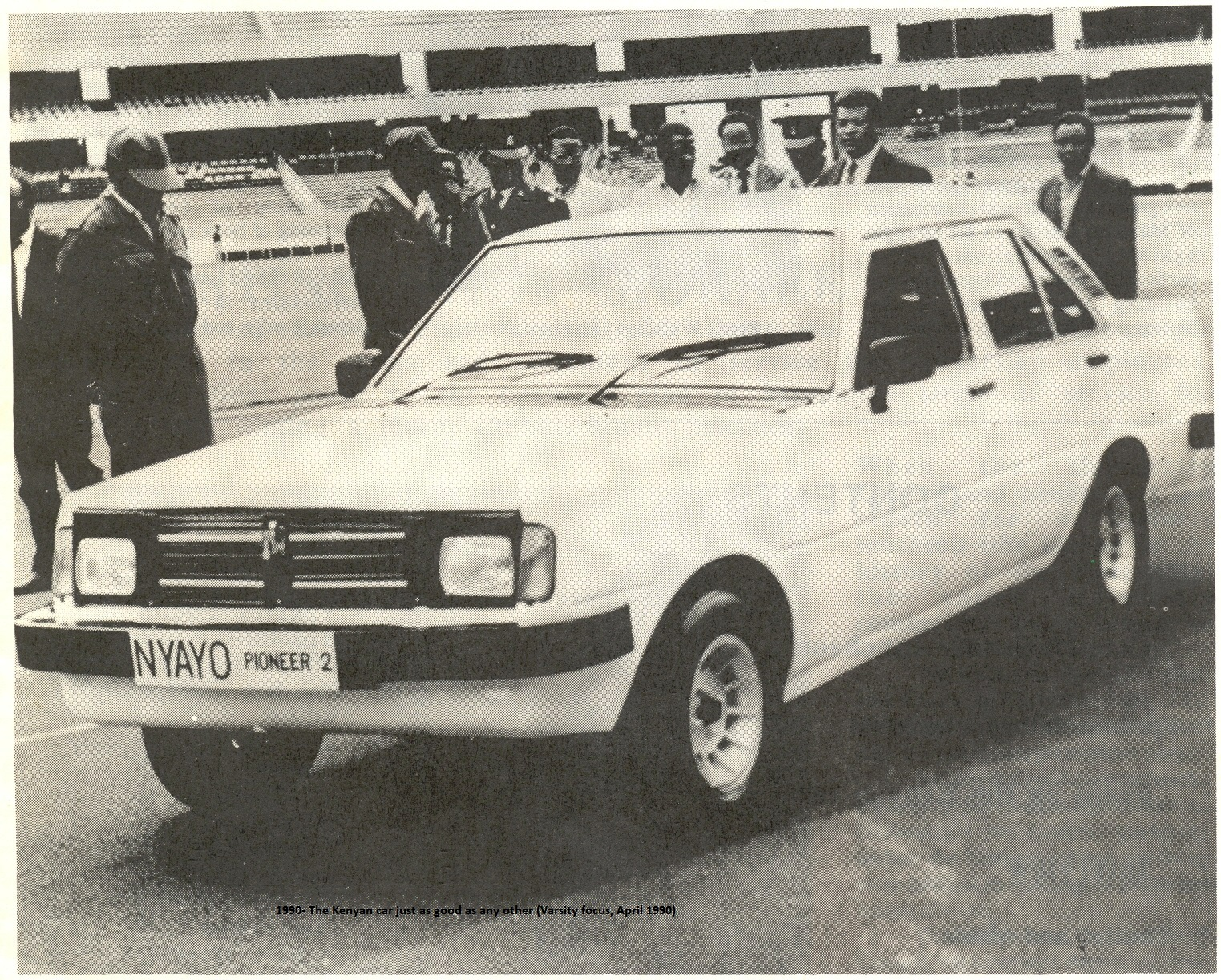
Nyayo Pioneer (1990)

- 1960s – Volkswagen assembled the Beetle in Kenya
- 1976 – First Kenyan Assembled car by Kenya Vehicle Manufacturers
- 1977 – First Assembled car by Associated Vehicle Assemblers Ltd.
- 1986 – Nyayo Car, Kenya's first car is built. The car achieves 120 km/h (75 mph)
- 2009 – Mobius Motors is established by Joel Jackson
- 2013 – 52.3% of new cars sold in Kenya are assembled in Kenya
- 2016 – Volkswagen starts assembly of Polo Vivo in Kenya in Cooperation with Kenya Vehicle Manufacturers and distributor DT Dobie

== Major retailers ==
- Toyota East Africa/Toyota Kenya
- Cooper Motor Corporation,
- General Motors East Africa (GMEA) Now Isuzu East Africa Ltd. since 2017.
- Simba Colt
- DT Dobie for VW.
- Inchcape Kenya Ltd
- Beiben Trucks – Nelion Trading Ltd
- Urysia Limited for Peugeot
- Transafrica Motors Ltd (FAW & IVECO)
- Rifasa executive auto ventures
- Expedition Motors

== Major assemblers ==
- Kenya Vehicle Manufacturers (KVM) – Assembles for Hyundai Motor, Volkswagen, and Peugeot S.A.
- General Motors East Africa (GMEA) Now Isuzu East Africa Ltd. since 2017.
- Honda Motorcycle Kenya Ltd
- Associated Vehicle Assemblers Ltd (AVA). (Largest Assembler in Kenya) Also Assembles for Toyota (East Africa)/ Toyota Kenya Ltd (TKL)
- TVS Motors Kenya
- Associated Motors (AM)
- Transafrica Motors Ltd-Mombasa (FAW & IVECO)

== Future assemblers ==
- Tata Motors
