= SamAvto =

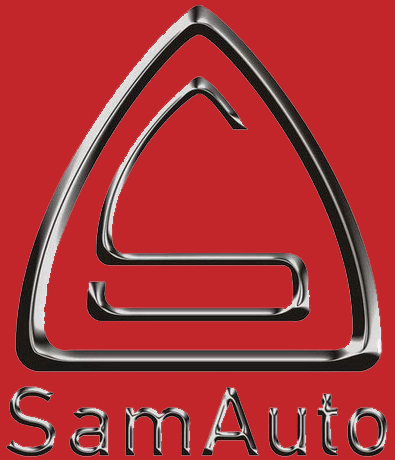
- Native name: Uzbek: SamAvto
- Formerly: SamKochAvto
- Type: Limited liability company
- Industry: Automotive
- Founded: 1996; 30 years ago
- Headquarters: Tashkent, Uzbekistan
- Area served: Worldwide
- Products: buses, pickups, trucks, special and specialized vehicles
- Brands: SamAvto
- Owner: UzAvtoSanoat
- Website: samauto.uz

SamAvto is a company producing automotive products in Uzbekistan. The plant is located in Samarkand. Until 2006, the company was called SamKochAvto. The plant produces buses, pickup trucks, trucks, special and specialized vehicles.

== History ==
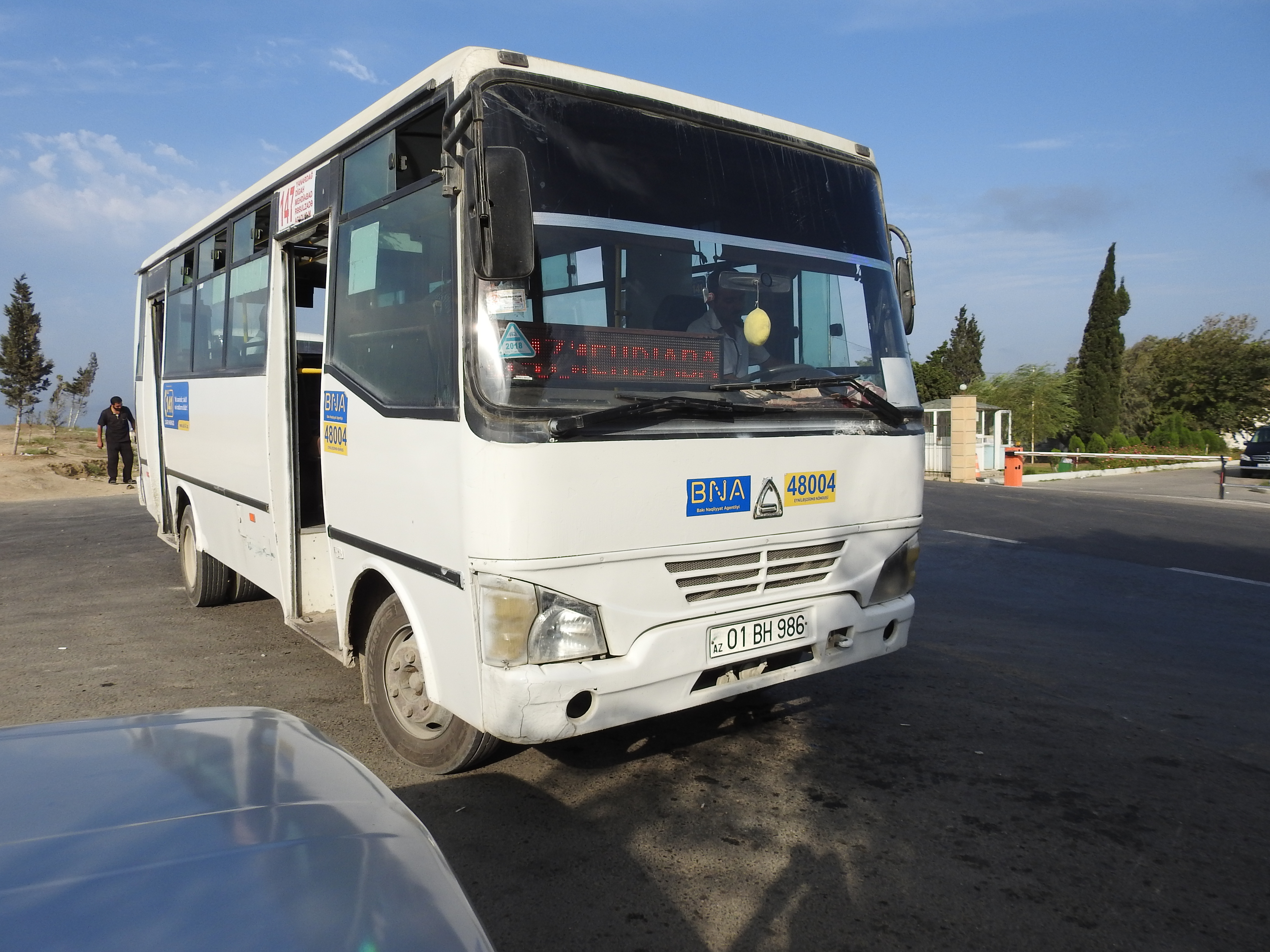
SAZ in Azerbaijan

SamKochAvto, originally Samarkand Automobile Factory (Uzbek: Samarqand avto zavodi), was organized in 1996 as a Turkish–Uzbekistani joint venture with major investment by the Turkish company Koc Holding. In 2006, the whole of the Turkish endeavour was incorporated into UzAvtoSanoat, and the remaining Uzbek portion was renamed SamAvto. Nowadays, SamAvto mainly distributes buses from UzAvtoSanoat and Isuzu.

== Products ==
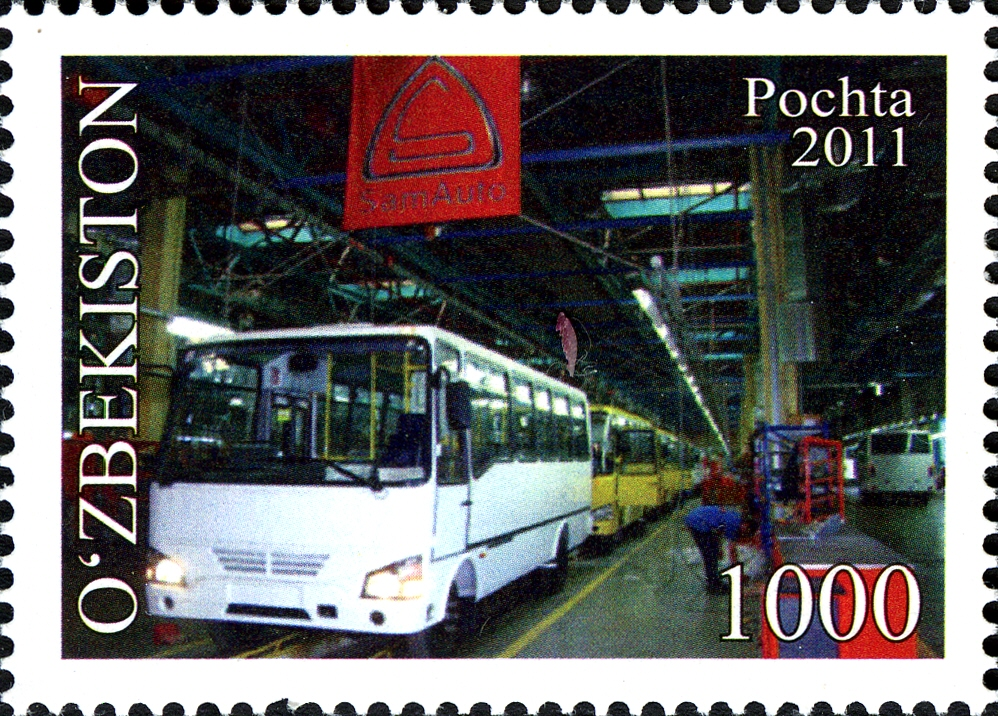
Stamp of Uzbekistan, 2011

The SamAuto lineup includes basic models in the small class SAZ NP 37 chassis based on the Japanese Isuzu, the low-floor small-class bus SAZ LE-60, ISUZU trucks and other special vehicles on the chassis of Isuzu.
