= Automotive industry in Uzbekistan =

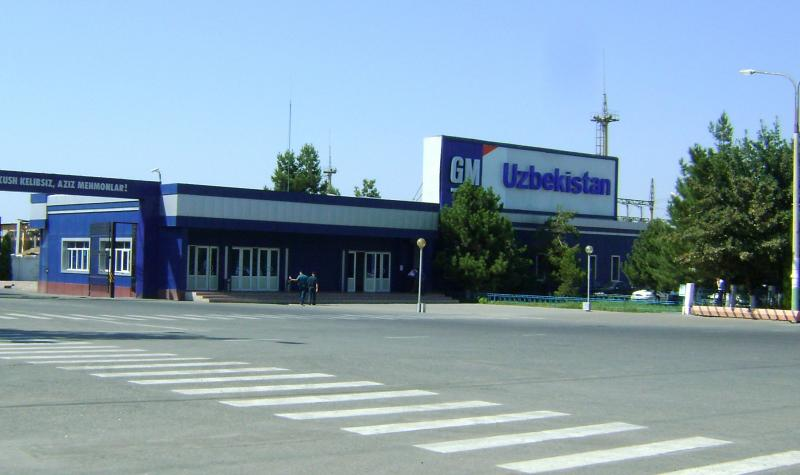
GM-Uzbekistan is the biggest automobile manufacturer in Uzbekistan

Before 1992, Uzbekistan had no automotive industry, being part of the Soviet Union. In post-Soviet times, UzDaewooAuto, SamKochAvto, GM Uzbekistan new auto producing plants were built with South Korean and American help. With production surpassing more than 200,000 per year, Uzbekistan exports automobiles to Russia and other CIS countries.

GM Uzbekistan, a joint venture, with manufacturing operations in Asaka features three vehicle assembly lines and one stamping operations plant with a growing local supply base supplemented by commodities and automotive parts largely from Asia Pacific region (e.g., steel coil from Russia, advanced technology parts from South Korea, etc.). With multi-shift operations, employment is estimated around 7000 people in a region otherwise known for agricultural production.

== Automobile manufacturers ==
=== GM Uzbekistan ===
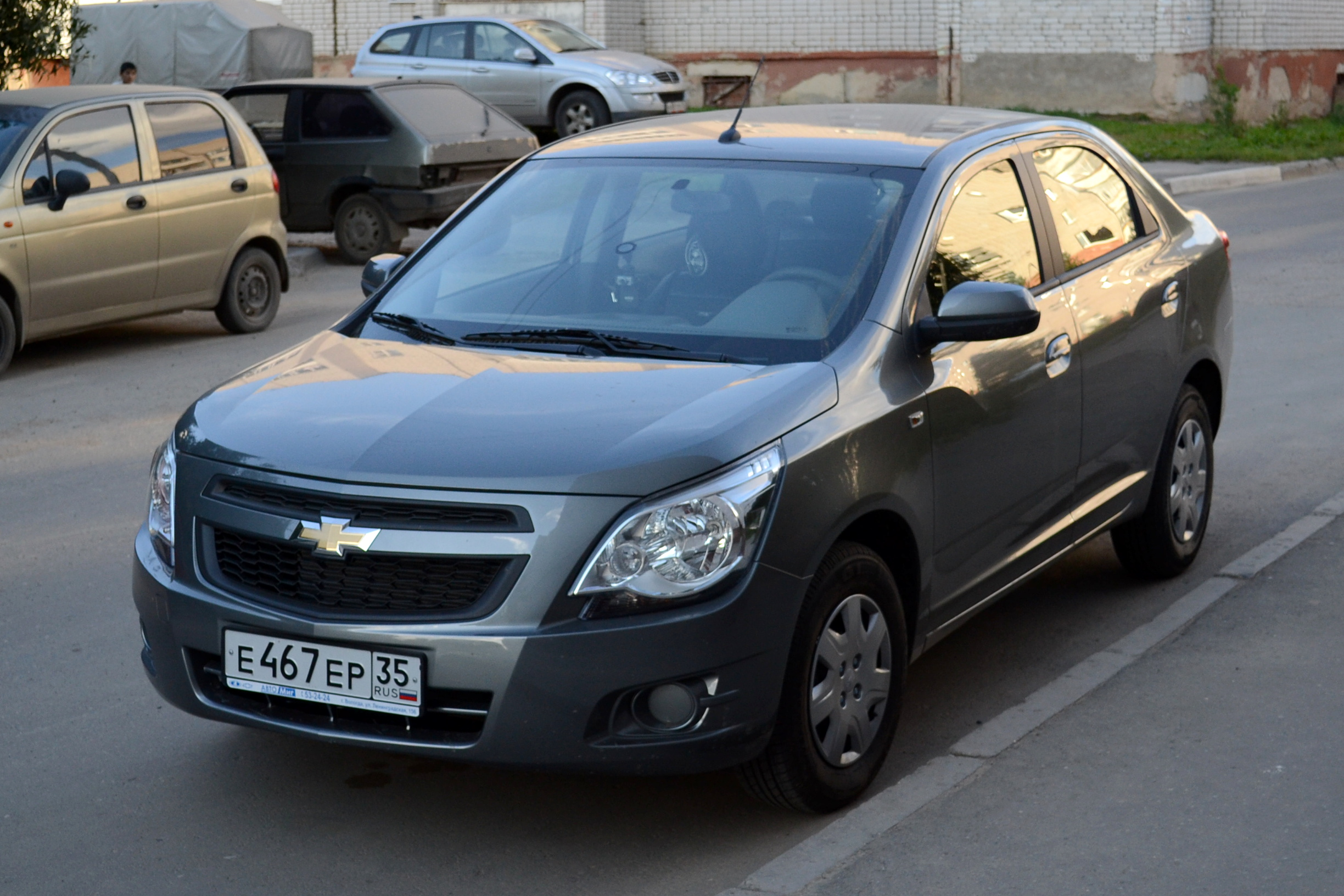
Chevrolet Cobalt

GM Uzbekistan is a joint venture between the Uzbek OJSC UzAvtosanoat (75%) and the American General Motors Company (25%) for the manufacturing of automobiles, and is located in Asaka, Uzbekistan

The JV originally was founded in 1996 between the Uzbek government and the South Korea-based Daewoo, and was initially known as UzDaewoo Auto. Following the change of ownership of Daewoo to GM Daewoo, the facility was renamed GM Uzbekistan in 2008 to continue to produce Uz-Daewoo branded vehicles. More recently these models are now sold as Chevrolets as in other international markets.

GM Uzbekistan began production on 27 November 2008. The first assembled car on this day was a Chevrolet Lacetti which also was the 1,000,000 assembled vehicle out of the production from UzAvtosanoat. The annual production of GM Uzbekistan are 250,000 units. Since the beginning of the third quarter Chevrolet is manufacturing the Chevrolet Spark M300 in Asaka. The M300 is currently intended only for export. Currently, the models are assembled CKD and SKD kits. But GM Uzbekistan plans to manufacture up to 50% of all needed parts and want to realize it soon as possible. Another plant is producing 200,000 units of front- rear- and side windows for the vehicles of the Uz-DaewooAvto and the Chevrolet Lacetti.

In 2010, about 5,000 employees were employed at the GM Uzbekistan assembly plant. GM Uzbekistan sold 121,584 vehicles locally in 2011, making the country the eighth-largest market for Chevrolet and produced more than 225,000 vehicles. In 2012, the Chevrolet Cobalt was added to the production line.

Following a new agreement in 2008, the joint venture GM Powertrain Uzbekistan opened an engine plant in Tashkent, 400 kilometres (248.5 mi) from GM Uzbekistan's vehicle manufacturing facility in Asaka, in November 2011. GM owns 52% and UzAvtosanoat has a 48% stake in the Powertrain JV. The factory is GM's first engine plant in Uzbekistan. It will produce more than 225,000 Ecotec 1.2L and 1.5L engines a year for use in GM small passenger cars around the world.

=== MAN Auto-Uzbekistan ===
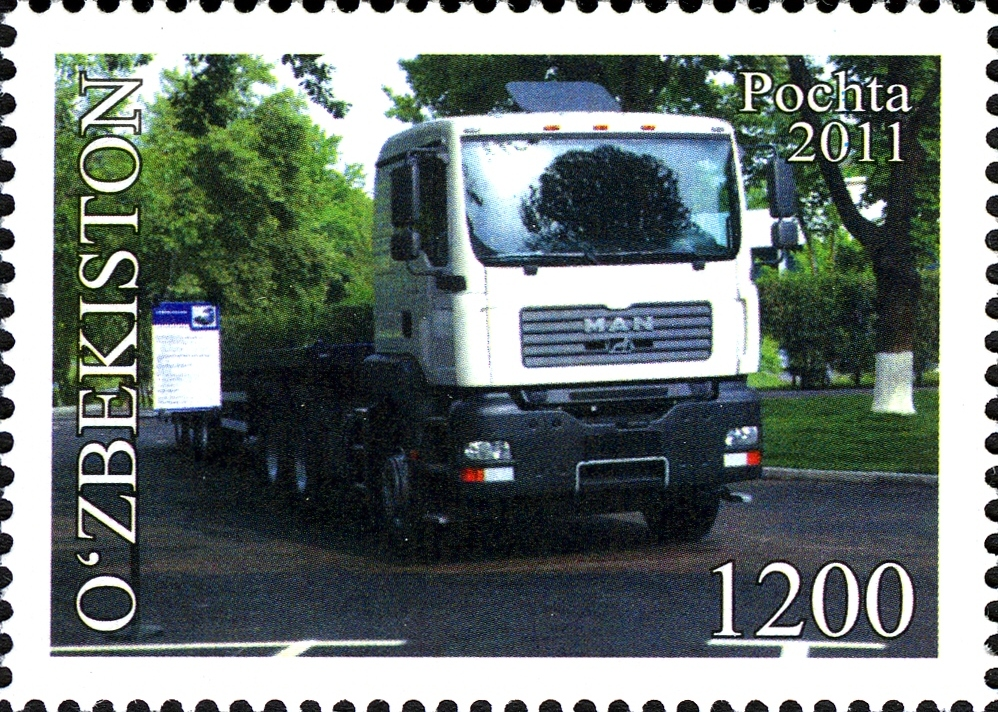
MAN truck on the stamp of Uzbekistan, 2011

The MAN AUTO-Uzbekistan Company is a joint venture between the German MAN Nutzfahrzeuge AG and the Uzbek OJSC UzAvtosanoat. The joint venture was founded in August 2009. Subsequently, the employees at the plant were trained by the MAN staff to ensure a proper assembly of the vehicles and to and increase the theoretical knowledge of the workforce. The consolidation of the contractual joint venture took place on 4 September 2009 at the Oqsaroy Residence in Tashkent. Agents of the parties were on the Uzbek side the President Islam Abdugʻaniyevich Karimov and the chairman of the UzAvtosanoat Mr. Ulugbek Rozukulov. The German side was represented only by the CEO Håkan Samuelsson.

The assembly of the vehicles began on the day when the joint venture contract was signed. SamAuto provides their assembly plant in Samarkand. One of the currently assembled models is the MAN TGA which is delivered as a CKD kit from Germany. Another model is the identical truck called MAN CLA which is made by the Indian MAN Force Trucks Pvt. Ltd. This units are also delivered as a CKD kit. According to plans of MAN they want to build 500 up to 1000 units annual. For the sales of the vehicles, UzAvtosanoat had established a separate dealer network. The production capacity is expected to rise later to more than 2000 units. MAN have plans to introducing the Indian CLA model version in a modified version especially for the Central Asian market called the MAN CLE. So the target markets for the Uzbek manufactured models is the Uzbek domestic market for itself and all markets of the CIS states. Some used vehicles are exported to Uzbekistan for the strategic market support as a complete vehicle by the Neuhaus GmbH located in Selm. In addition to the TGA and the CLA series there are also the TGA TGM series and the obsolete models MAN F2000, MAN M2000 and MAN F8 available.

UzAvtosanoat is the only truck manufacturer of Central Asia and plans to become a monopolistic company of the commercial vehicle sector. After the collapse of their former SamKochAvto joint venture, MAN is a promising partner for the company. Håkan Samuelsson, the German contract agent of MAN, was involved into the MAN-bribes scandal which became known in the late 2009. There have been suggestions that the UzAvtosanoat entangled in it, or could be affected.

In the first phase, the manufacturing should be adjusted to the various economic sectors such as the oil, gas and mining industry by using the local norms of the different targeted markets. Despite the global economic crisis it is seen that these sectors will achieves a dynamic growth. Also the expansion of the infrastructure will increase the demand for automobiles and other vehicles.

=== SamKochAvto ===
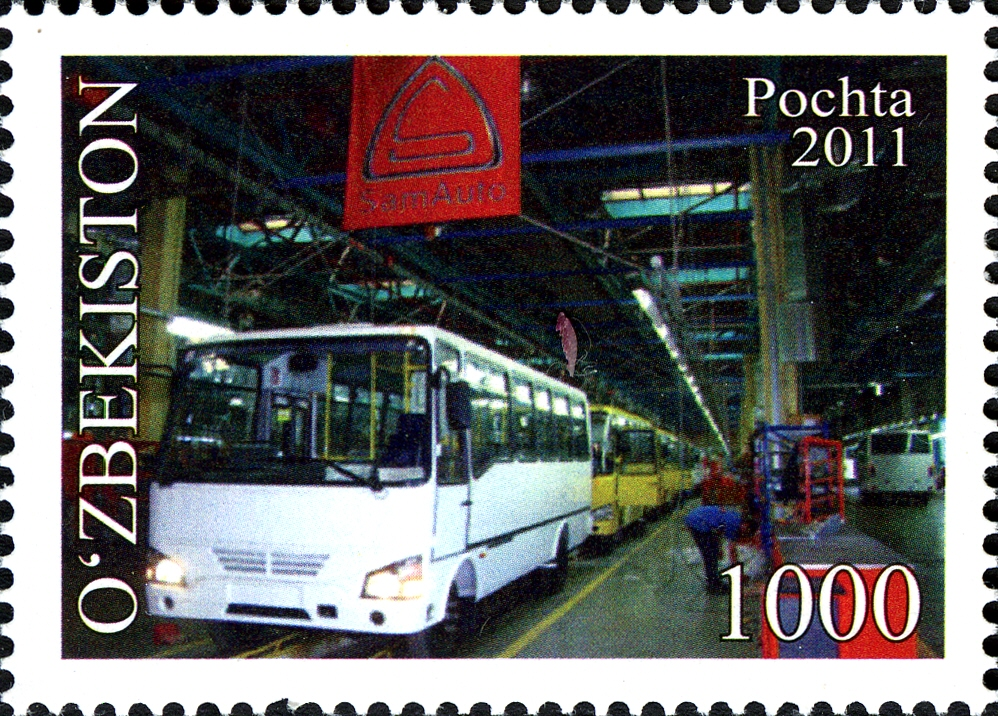
SAZ bus on the stamp of Uzbekistan, 2011

SamKochAvto, originally Samarkand Automobile Factory, is a joint Turkish–Uzbek venture with major investment by the Turkish company Koc Holding. Located in Samarkand, Uzbekistan, the plant manufactures buses and has recently launched a production line for Nissan cargo trucks. SamKochAvto produces 4 models of buses and 5 truck models, some of which are exported. Plans have been announced for production of Suzukis.

"Samarkand automobile plant" for the production of medium-capacity buses and small trucks and medium-duty trucks, organized in 1996 by the decision of the Government of the Republic of Uzbekistan for the number 381 from 05.11.1996, the commencement of commercial operations from March 19, 1999.

The SamAuto lineup includes basic models in the small class SAZ NP 37 chassis Japanese Isuzu, low-floor bus of small class SAZ LE-60, Isuzu trucks and other special vehicles on the chassis of Isuzu.

Uzbekistan produces many car models, including the Kia K5, K8, K9, Kia Sorento, Kia Sonnet, Kia Seltos, Hyundai Sonata, Santa Fe, BYD Chazor, and Song Pro.

== Former manufacturers ==
=== UzDaewooAvto ===
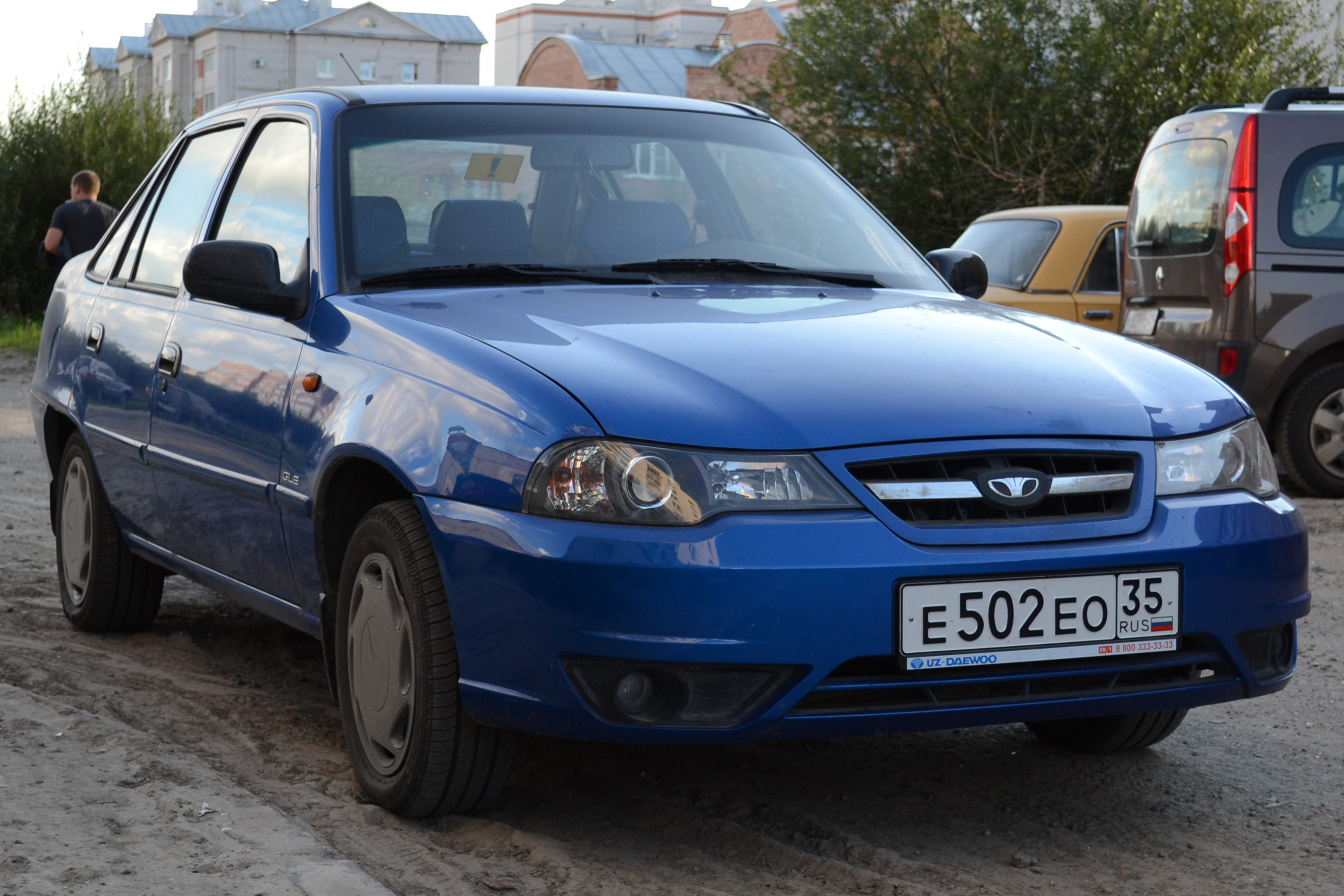
Daewoo Nexia II

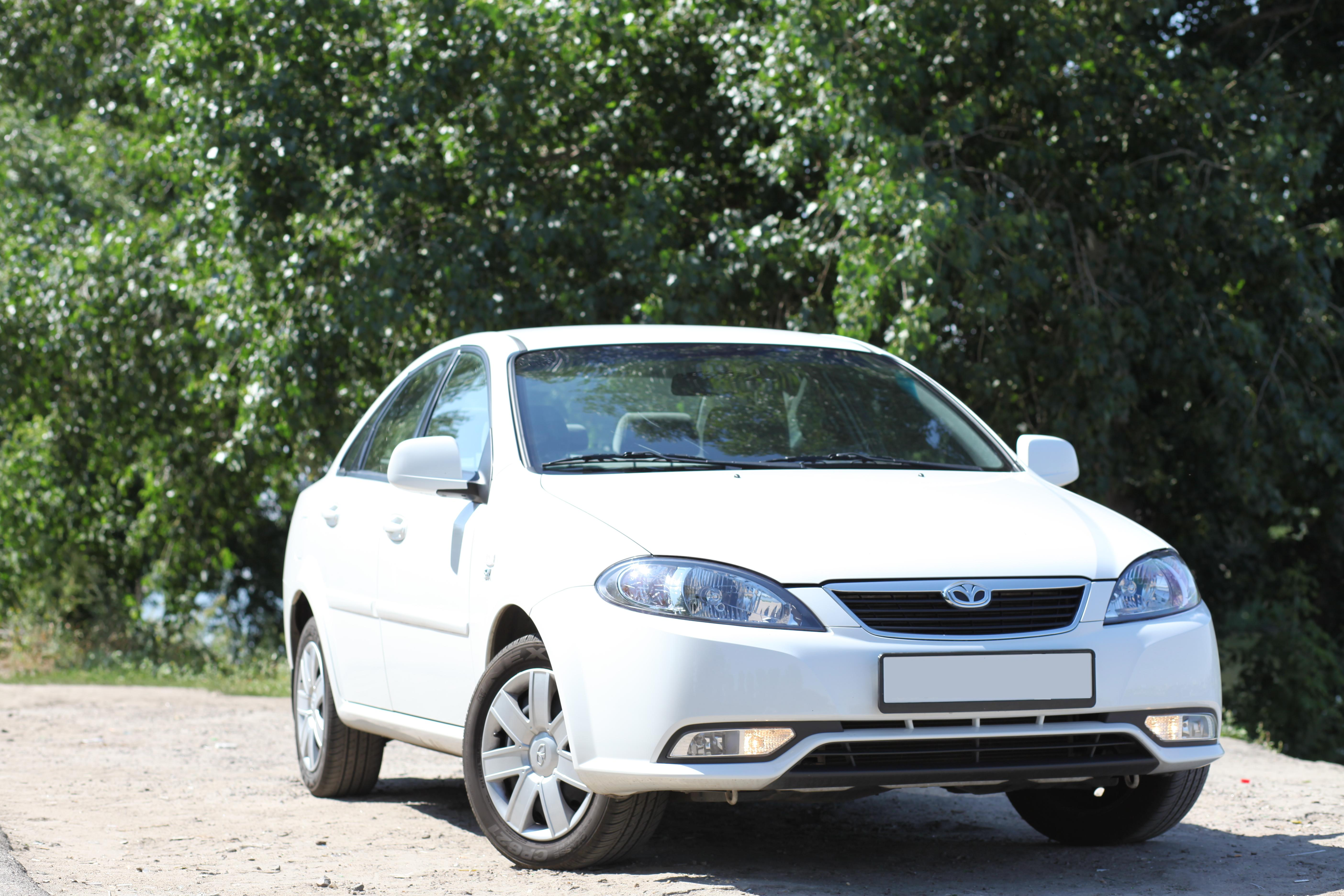
Daewoo Gentra

UzDaewooAuto was a joint venture founded in 1992 between the Uzbek state owned UzAvtosanoat and the South Korean headquartered, American owned GM Korea. The company began production of vehicles on 19 July 1996, at the new assembly plant located in Asaka. UzDaewooAuto produced cars under Daewoo brand from 1996 to 2008. GM Uzbekistan is succeeder of UzDaewooAuto since 2008.

The company produced vehicles under the brand name Uz-Daewoo and is increasingly important in the markets of the CIS area. The initiative to establish the Uzbek automobile industry goes back to the early 1990s and the administration of State President Islam Abdugʻaniyevich Karimov.

Following Daewoo's collapse in 2001, and resulting change of ownership, GM Uzbekistan was eventually established in March 2008 as a new replacement joint venture, and the Nexia and Matiz were sold under the Chevrolet badge together with an extended range of GM Korea Chevrolet models produced at the Asaka factory. The joint venture is owned by Uzavtosanoat JSC (75%) and General Motors Corporation (25%). GM Uzbekistan produced 106,334 units during the first half of 2011.
