= Mobius Motors =

Kenyan automobile manufacturer

- Type: Privately held company
- Industry: Automotive industry
- Founded: 2010 (13 years ago)
- Founder: Joel Jackson
- Headquarters: Nairobi, Kenya
- Area served: East Africa; Africa
- Key people: Joel Jackson (Founder and CEO)
- Products: Automobiles
- Website: Mobius Motors

Mobius Motors Kenya Limited was a vehicle re-assembler founded in 2010. The company was incorporated in the United Kingdom in 2010 and registered in Kenya in 2011. As of 2018, the company was in the process of building an in country manufacturing plant. On 5 August 2024, the shareholders' meeting that convened in Nairobi, Kenya resolved to liquidate the company and selected SVSK Sastry as the liquidator.

The company manufactured SUVs (sport utility vehicles) designed to handle the rough roads and rugged terrain found in many parts of regional Africa.

== Name ==
The name comes from the Mobius strip, a special mathematical surface with a single surface and single boundary, first described by German mathematician August Ferdinand Möbius in 1858.

== Key people ==
Joel Jackson is the founder and CEO of Mobius Motors. Prior to founding Mobius, Jackson worked on business strategy with an acclaimed micro-forestry social enterprise in rural Kenya. He also worked as a management consultant, advising top Fortune 500 companies across Europe and North America. He is the recipient of the TED fellowship and Echoing Green Fellowship and a graduate of Imperial College with a first-class degree in Computer Science.

== History ==
=== 2009–2011 ===
On a visit to Kenya, Joel Jackson recognized the need for a rugged, affordable vehicle to improve transportation around the country, especially in rural areas. He formed a small team that spent ten months in research and development to produce the Mobius I, Mobius Motors’ first prototype. The Mobius I provided valuable learning, shaping Jackson's approach to simplified design and smart use of off-the-shelf components to keep development costs low.

Initially, the company operated out of a small shed in Kilifi on the Kenyan coast. The company moved first to Mombasa and then to Nairobi where the company headquarters and showroom are located at Sameer Business Park off Mombasa Road. Before acquiring external funding in 2012, Joel Jackson bootstrapped the company's operations.

=== 2011–2016 ===
The first round of funding enabled the Mobius Motors to start the design and development of its second prototype and what would eventually become its first production model. The improved model was named Mobius II and featured better design and engineering than its predecessor.

In 2014, the first production of Mobius II hit the market to a warm reception, despite concerns regarding the company's pushing back of release dates. The Mobius II employed minimalistic design, sticking to basic functionality and lacking such basic functionalities of modern cars as power steering, door handles, GPS navigation, and glass windows.

Even then, the 50 vehicles produced by Mobius Motors in partnership with the Kenya Vehicle Manufacturers had sold out by June 2016.

=== 2016–present ===
After the initial production of the first 50 the Mobius II vehicles, the company discontinued its production and started to develop the next vehicle. The new Mobius II is scheduled for release in 2019 with an increased production potential of several thousand vehicles per year.

In early 2018, Mobius Motors closed its Series A equity financing and raised additional funding of Ksh 500 million from the United States Overseas Private Investment Corporation (OPIC). This investment allowed the company to set up a new factory in the industrial area of Nairobi near Mombasa Road. The new Mobius factory will be the only one in East Africa doing complete assembly of passenger vehicles with capabilities in fabrication, body shop, paint shop, general assembly, and final line testing. The new Mobius II will be the first car to be produced at the new factory.

Full production will commence as soon as additional capital is raised.

== The first prototype ==
=== Mobius I ===
Mobius I was Mobius Motors’ first prototype, a practical, no-frills vehicle composed of a tubular steel frame and off-the-shelf parts. In the founder's words, it looked like a ‘dune buggy’. Although the Mobius I prototype was built by welders and mechanics from the Jua Kali industry (informal sector in Kenya comprising small-scale traders, craftspeople, and entrepreneurs), it proved that there was potential to build a car that could navigate both urban roads and degraded roads in rural areas. It was on the basis of this prototype that the company's subsequent Mobius II would follow.

== Production models ==
=== Mobius II (first generation) ===
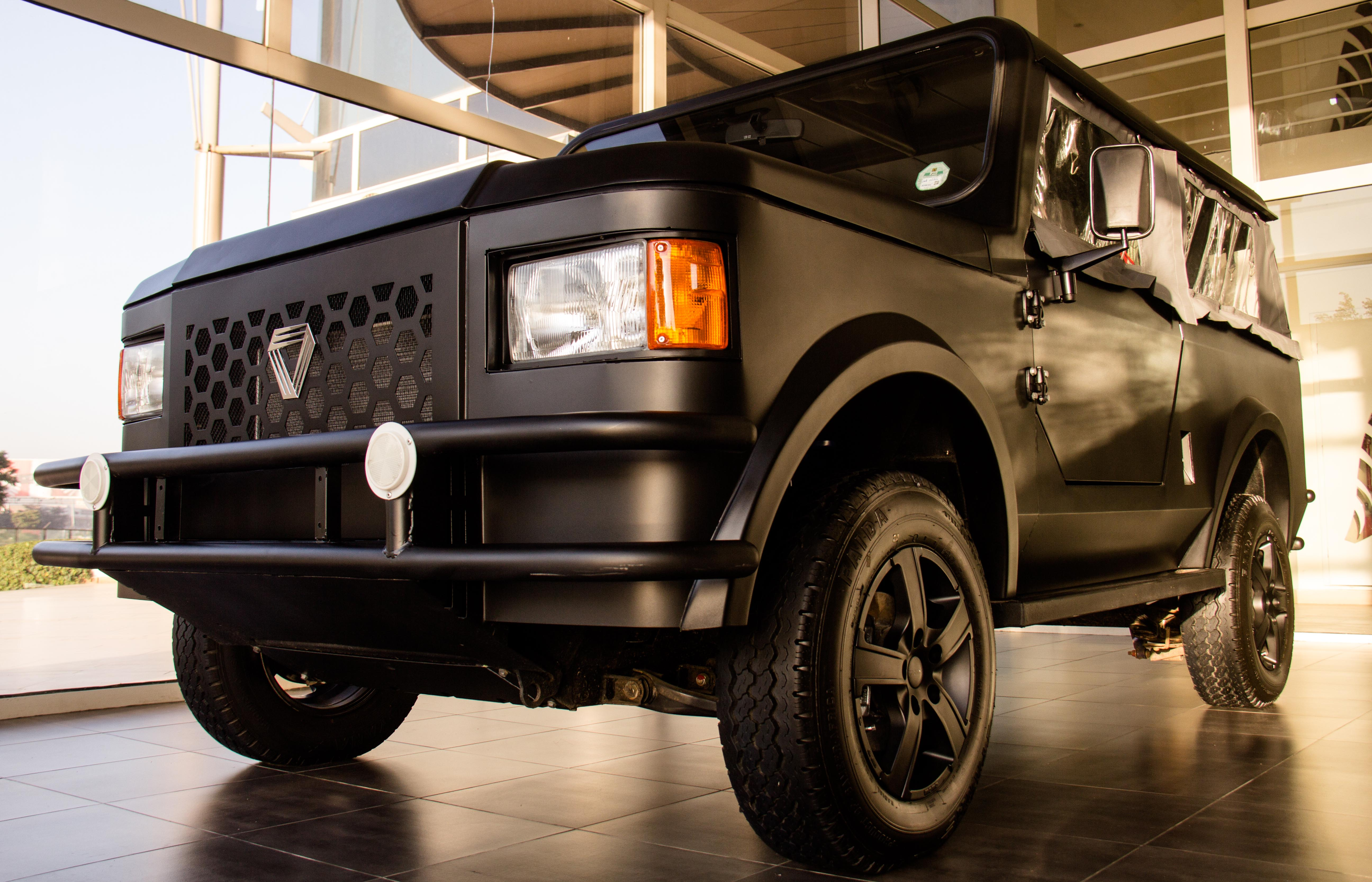
Mobius II

After raising external financing, Mobius Motors started work on the next prototype for the first production model. The Mobius II (first generation) featured more detailed engineering and design from a team of professional engineers. The cost for building this second prototype was Ksh 1.5 million, with the record development schedule of three months.

In October 2014, Mobius Motors launched the production model Mobius II (first generation) at a retail price of about Ksh 1 million, a price that made it the most affordable new vehicle in Kenya.

The Mobius II designation referred to the vehicle's body type, rather than as a sequential continuation from the Mobius I prototype

Specs

- The Mobius II body is 3.9 M long, 1.8 M wide, and 1.85 M high with 23 cm of ground clearance. It has a tare weight of 1265 kg and a loading capacity of 625 kg.
- It is powered by a 4-cylinder, 1598 cc petrol engine with a capacity of 86 horsepower at 5500 rpms. The transmission is a 5-speed manual with a top speed of 120 km/h.
- The maximum torque for the Mobius II is 128 Nm at 3000 rpms.
- The 3-door Mobius II allowed eight passengers, 2 in front and 6 in the rear.

While market reception was favorable and all 50 cars produced sold out by June 2016, the Mobius II was criticized by some for being too basic, particularly for use in more urban areas. For example, the vehicle lacked air conditioning, power steering, and lockable doors, and it offered canvas windows rather than glass. The car featured a lock-box in which owners could safely store their personal items to avoid theft.

Customers had no options for customization of any of the car's features, a limitation that was addressed with the second-generation Mobius II.

=== New Mobius II (second generation) ===
The extendable ladder chassis allows the Mobius II (second generation) to be used for a variety of purposes

The new Mobius II was a huge improvement on the previous Mobius II model. It featured a sleeker design, a more rugged chassis structure, improved suspension, and better balancing. Mobius Motors also introduced power steering, glass windows, lockable doors, and an infotainment system, features that were lacking in the first production model. A tougher frame structure also improved the car's ability to withstand heavy stress from rough road driving. The new model will be available in different colors and with a selection of additional options such as air-conditioning (AC), alloy rims or roof rack. Specs

The new Mobius II (second generation) features a wider and longer body of about 4.2 M in length, 1.9 M width, 1.8 M height, and a 2.4 M wheelbase. The car also features an improved ground clearance of 330 mm.

- It has a tare weight of 1650 kg and maintains the 625 kg loading capacity of the first generation.
- A 4-cylinder Inline petrol engine with a capacity of 1798 cc, double overhead camshaft (DOHC), 16 valves and variable valve timing (VVT), producing 133 horsepower at 5600 rpms. The car is equipped with a five-speed manual transmission.
- The maximum torque for the new Mobius II is 182 Nm in the range of 3600 to 4600rpms.

With the new Mobius II, customers will be given the opportunity to choose configurations ranging in price from Ksh 1.3 million to Ksh 1.6 million. Buyers will get to choose between three trim-levels for the new Mobius II (Cargo, Adventure, and Adventure Plus) with the latter featuring GPS navigation, Wi-Fi connectivity, and Bluetooth© among other features. This diversification was informed by the desire of Mobius Motors to reach a wider audience than with the first generation model.

Perhaps the most remarkable improvement in the design of the new Mobius II (next generation) was the inclusion of an extendable ladder chassis that will allow future variants of the car to be used for public transport, medical transport (ambulances), and goods delivery. The geographical market for the car has also expanded to include Kenya's neighbors Tanzania and Uganda.

=== Mobius 3 ===
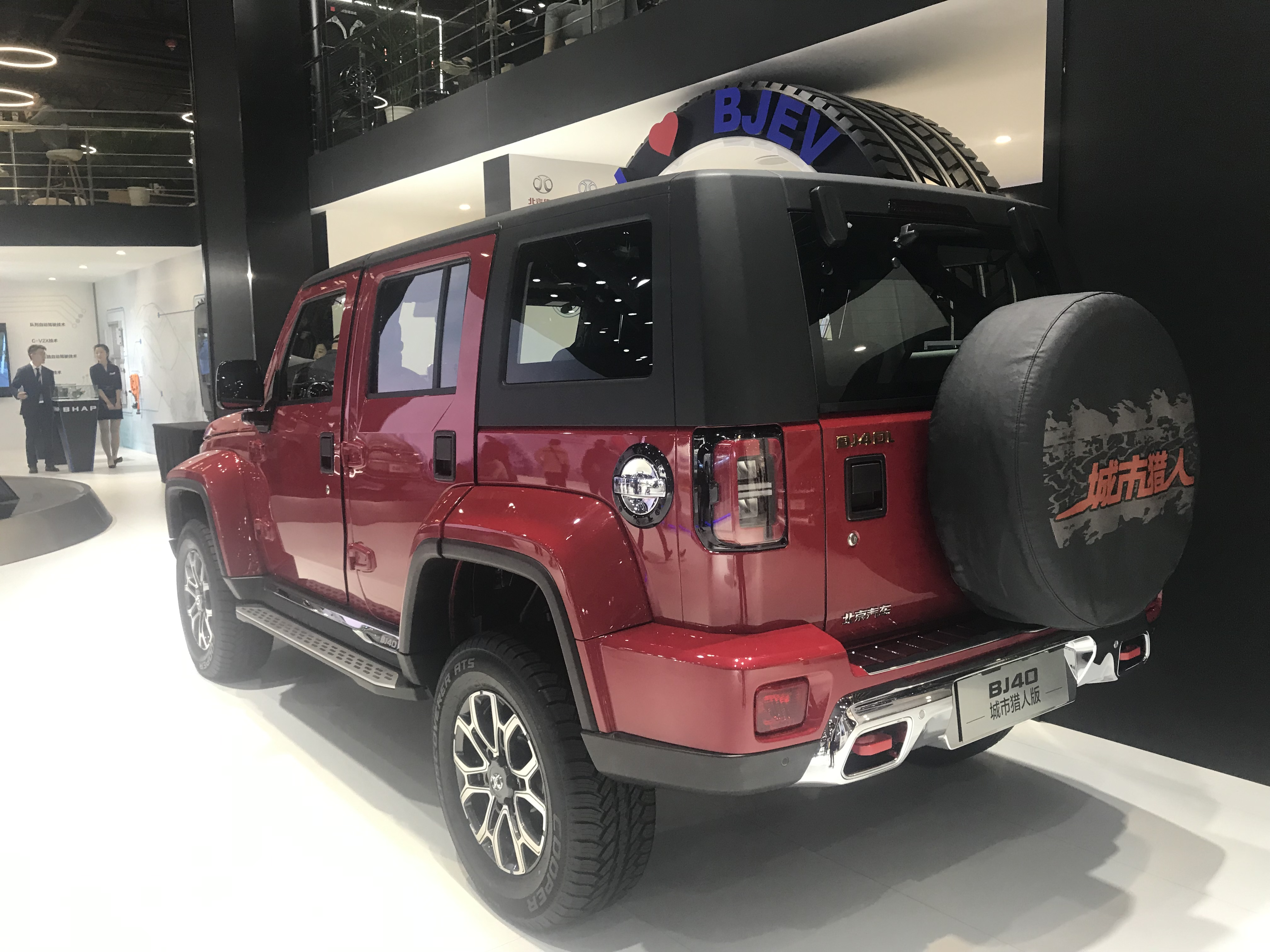
Beijing BJ40 Plus, the vehicle the Mobius 3 is based on

The Mobius 3, a rebadged Beijing BJ40 was launched in 2021.

== Strategic outlook ==
=== Concept cars ===
Mobius Motors has announced plans to diversify the utility of its vehicles by including an extendable ladder chassis to make it possible for their vehicles to be used for functions such as goods delivery, public transport, and ambulances. The next-generation Mobius II will be the first vehicle featuring this improvement. The company has also expressed interest in hybrid and electric cars in the future.

Mobius Motors is looking to expand to the rest of the country by opening Sales & Service Centers in Mombasa in 2019 and later on in Western Kenya with a service station in Kisumu. The company is also projected to expand regionally and in the rest of Africa later on.

=== Planned car factory ===
After acquiring funding from the United States Overseas Private Investment Corporation (OPIC), Mobius Motors announced plans to build their own factory. The factory will be the first such production facility in the country as other vehicle manufacturers focus only on commercial vehicles or light assembly to finish nearly-built cars. The factory is expected to provide the company greater control over the timing and scale of its production, addressing its historical challenges with production delays. An expanded research and development space is also expected to accelerate future product development.

== Marketing and placement ==
=== Brand values ===
According to Mobius Motors founder and CEO, the company aims to establish itself as the ideal automaker to spearhead the industrialization of the continent. The company upholds the values of affordability by using simplified user interface while maintaining durability with the use of a tubular steel frame.

The Mobius Motors logo uses the properties of the Mobius strip which has a single surface and single boundary, representing perpetuity and unity. The company targets the transportation needs of young entrepreneurs in agriculture and commerce. The company's marketing stresses the ability of their rugged vehicles to navigate the degraded roads around the country.

=== Location ===
Mobius Motors' head offices is located at a showroom at Mombasa road in Nairobi. The company has also announced plans to open a new Sales & Service Center (SSC) in Mombasa in early 2019.

=== Mobius Motors in the media and academia ===
International media houses like Forbes, Venture Beat, Fast Company, Wired, and Reuters have praised the effort of Joel Jackson to create a car for the often overlooked African market and the empowerment of latent talent therein. Joel Jackson has also featured in TED Talk events discussing the vision of Mobius Motors to power entrepreneurship in Kenya, East Africa, and the African continent. The Stanford Business School wrote a business case on Mobius Motors in 2012, outlining the company's commitment to building an African car affordable and durable enough for local needs.
