= Nyayo Car =

Kenyan prototype car

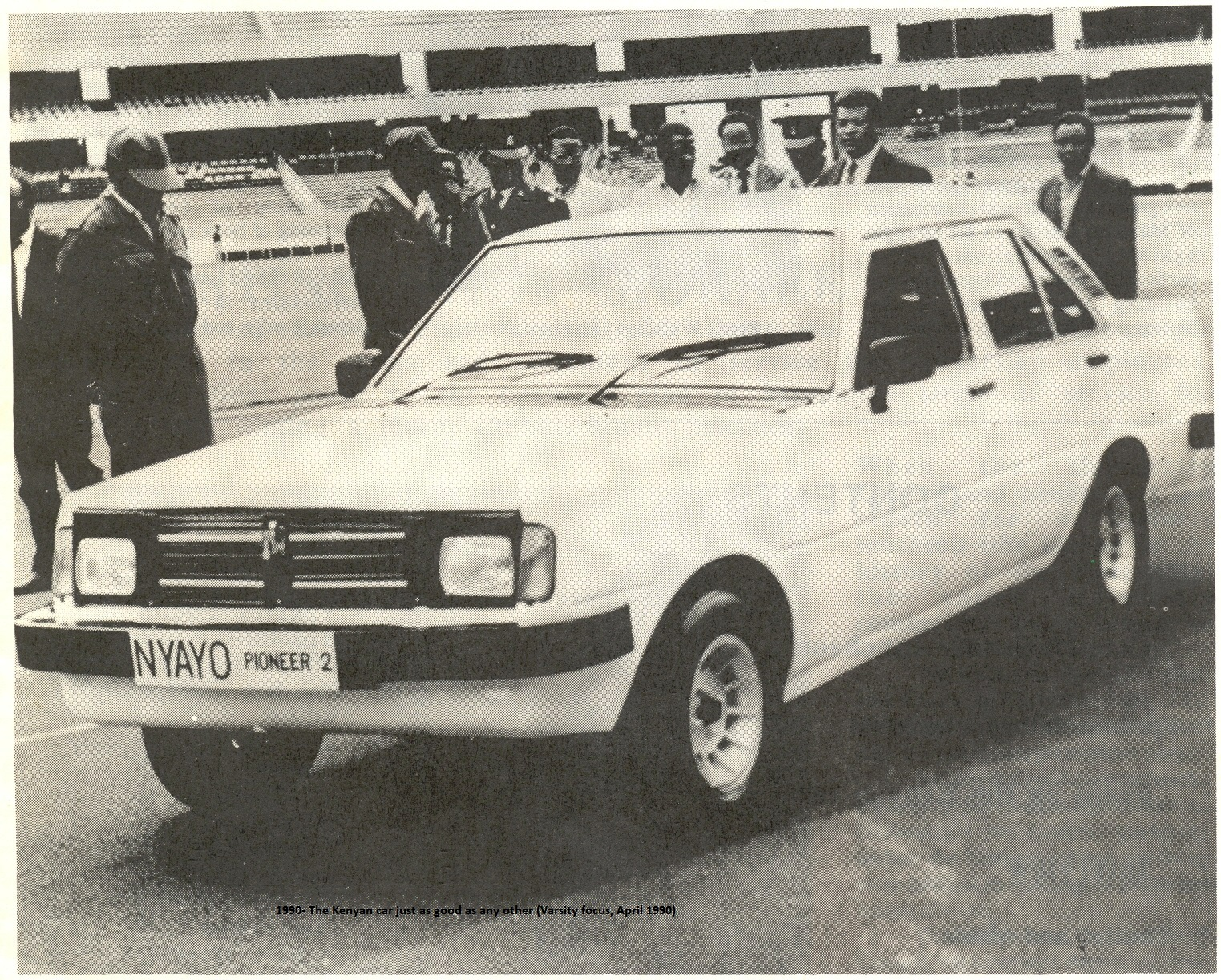
Nyayo Pioneer (1990)

The Nyayo Car was a project made by the Kenyan government to plan and manufacture Kenyan cars. The project was initiated in 1986 when then president Daniel arap Moi asked the University of Nairobi to develop these vehicles.

Five prototypes were made, they were known as the Pioneer Nyayo Cars and they could achieve a top speed of up to 120 km/h (75 mph). The Nyayo Motor Corporation was established to mass-produce these cars. However, due to a lack of funds, the car never entered production.

The Nyayo Motor Corporation was later renamed to Numerical Machining Complex Limited, manufacturing metal parts for various local industries. The car became a synonym for the many white elephants that signified the government of the day.
