= Automotive industry in Egypt =

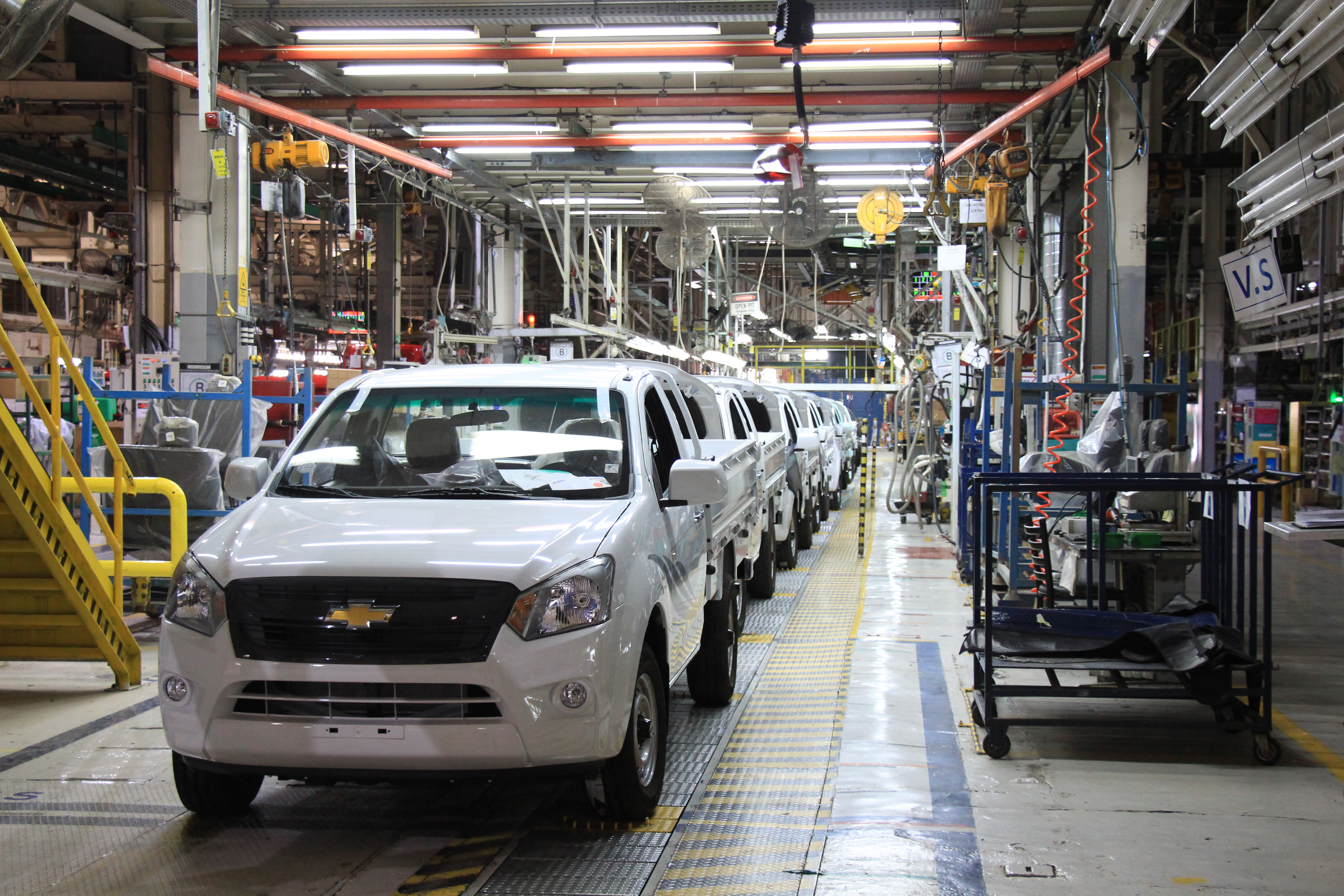
An assembly line for pickup trucks at the General Motors Egypt plant

The automotive industry in Egypt has been a state priority since the late 1950s, symbolizing national industrialization and economic prestige. Since the launch of the first locally manufactured car, Ramses, Egypt has attracted major international brands, including BMW, Jeep, and Mercedes-Benz. As of 2024, 15 manufacturers assemble vehicles locally, with domestic content exceeding 45% and accounting for over 60% of national sales.

In 2022, the government launched the Automotive Industry Development Strategy, aiming to establish Egypt as a regional hub for car manufacturing, particularly in Africa. The strategy includes fiscal incentives, policies to boost local component use, and support for low- and zero-emission vehicles through the eco-friendly automotive industry support fund.

The Supreme Council for the Automotive Industry and the Automotive Industry Unit were established to coordinate implementation, regulatory reform, and investor engagement. Several agreements were signed with companies such as Nissan, General Motors, Stellantis, and Proton to expand local production, including in designated industrial zones like Ibaz and Ain Sokhna.

Despite investment momentum, challenges remain. A 2023 study by the German University in Cairo identified skills mismatches and weak labor-market alignment as major constraints, noting Egypt’s low global talent competitiveness ranking. Structural reforms in education and vocational training are seen as critical to improving workforce readiness and supporting sustainable industry growth.

== History ==
=== Establishment and early development ===
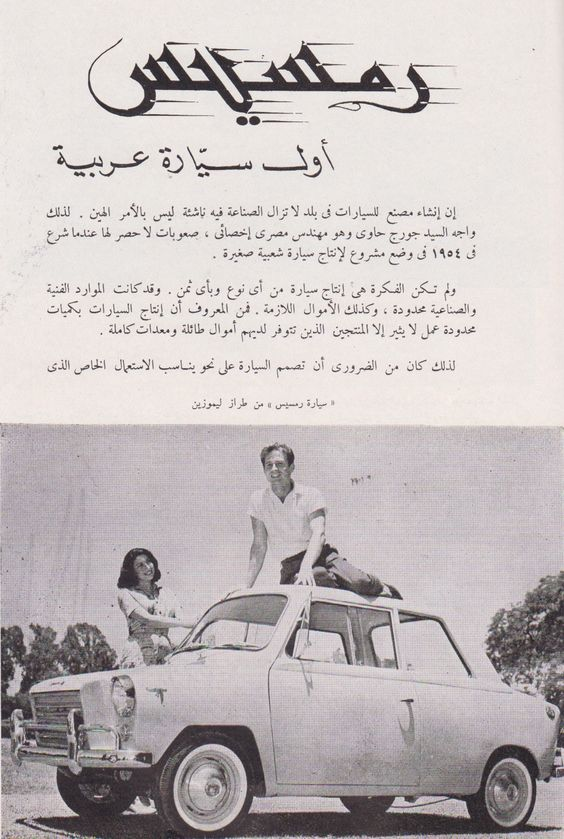
An ad for Ramses, "the first Arab car"

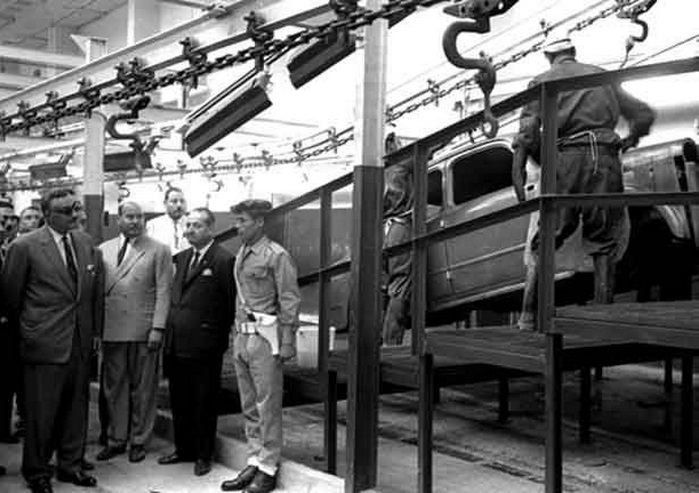
President Nasser at the inauguration of the Nasr Automotive factory in Helwan

The Egyptian government first entered the automotive sector in 1960 by establishing the state-owned Egyptian Automotive Company, which later became El Nasr Automotive Manufacturing Company, in Helwan as part of President Gamal Abdel Nasser’s broader industrialization strategy. Production operations began in 1962, and the company initially launched Egypt’s first domestically manufactured automobile, the Ramses. Developed with support from the Ministry of Industry and based on the German-made NSU Prinz, the Ramses car was assembled through a combination of public investment and consumer pre-orders.

Marketed as a symbol of national progress, the Ramses initially generated high public demand, but its production remained limited, estimated at five to six units per day, and quality issues emerged due to the absence of automated manufacturing tools such as body presses. By the early 1970s, the car was no longer competitive in terms of price or reliability compared to imported alternatives. In 1972, El Nasr shifted its approach by entering a production partnership with Fiat, focusing on the assembly of licensed models for the domestic market.

In the decades following its establishment, El Nasr expanded its licensed production portfolio to include vehicles from international manufacturers such as Zastava Automobili, Daimler AG, Kia, and Peugeot. The company’s lineup eventually featured models including the Jeep Cherokee, the Jeep AAV TJL, the Kia Spectra, and the Peugeot 405 and Peugeot 406. El Nasr also introduced its own branded models, most notably the Nasr 128 GLS, which became one of the best-selling cars in Egypt during its production period.

=== Impact of the Open-Door Policy ===
Following the launch of Egypt’s Open Door Policy, or Infitah, in 1974 under President Anwar Sadat, the 1980s saw a growing influx of foreign investment in the automotive sector. In 1985, General Motors established a joint venture with Mansour Automotive Company, a local distributor and car dealer. The Egyptian government's adoption of the Economic Reform and Structural Adjustment Program in the early 1990s further liberalized the economy and encouraged additional multinational automakers to establish local assembly operations.

Throughout the 1980s, state-owned Nasr was the dominant local manufacturer, but the sector remained relatively small. Liberalization policies and economic reforms in the 1990s encouraged foreign investment, resulting in the entry of several international automakers into the Egyptian market. Over time, the industry expanded to include key players such as Arab American Vehicles, Egy-Tech Engineering, Ghabbour Group, WAMCO, and Manufacturing Commercial Vehicles (MCV). Founded in 1994, MCV began producing commercial vehicles in partnership with Mercedes-Benz. Its facility in El Salheya employs around 2,500 workers and serves both domestic and export markets.

=== Decline after the 2011 Revolution ===
In 2010, Egypt's automotive industry reached a production peak of 116,683 vehicles, marking its highest output to date. However, the political upheaval of the Egyptian Revolution of 2011 significantly disrupted the sector. Several global manufacturers, including Nissan and Toyota, suspended operations due to security concerns, while Korean firms such as Samsung, LG, and Hyundai withdrew personnel and scaled down activity. BMW and Daimler AG also temporarily halted operations, while General Motors implemented similar safety measures.

=== National Automotive Industry Strategy 2024–2030 ===
In 2022 the Egyptian government launched the National Automotive Industry Strategy to address the challenges facing the industry and develop it. The plan targets an annual output of 400,000 to 500,000 vehicles by 2030, with 25% allocated for export, representing an anticipated $4 billion in yearly revenue. To achieve this, the government has supported the formation of joint ventures between local firms and international partners. Notable initiatives include Ezz Elarab Group and El Sewedy Electric partnering with Malaysia's Proton Holdings, and Nissan's expansion of production capacity for new economy-class models. Chinese manufacturer Exeed has also begun local assembly operations in partnership with Egyptian-German Automotive in 6th of October.

Electric vehicle (EV) manufacturing has emerged as a key pillar of this strategy. Egypt aims to begin EV production in 2025, focusing on the domestic market and export-oriented public transport solutions. Pilot projects include e-taxis developed in collaboration with Chinese companies and Nasr. Plans are also underway to establish specialized automotive hubs and industrial zones for EV production and component manufacturing, supporting wider goals of localization and sustainability.

== Overview ==
The automotive industry in Egypt has evolved significantly since its inception in the mid-20th century, with increasing emphasis on domestic assembly, parts manufacturing, and supply chain localization. Historically driven by consumer demand, recent developments have also prioritized export potential and integration into global value chains.

As of the late 2010s, Egypt was home to 83 automotive firms. Major international manufacturers including General Motors, BMW, Hyundai, Toyota, and Nissan have established operations in the country. Over 15 assembly plants and 75 facilities collectively employ more than 75,000 workers. Egypt’s total installed capacity is estimated at 300,000 vehicles per year. However, car ownership remains relatively low, at 35 vehicles per 1,000 inhabitants, compared to 130 in Algeria.

Vehicle sales have generally mirrored production trends. In 2005, annual vehicle sales stood at 121,437 units, rising to a historic high of 349,100 in 2015. In the first half of 2018, sales rose by 40% compared to the same period the previous year.

Brand market share data from 2017 indicated Chevrolet as the leading brand, holding 22.3% of the market with 21,468 vehicles sold, a 34.7% drop from the previous year. Nissan followed with a 16.5% share, ahead of Hyundai (14.1%), Toyota (8.2%), Mitsubishi (5%), and Chery (4.6%).

The devaluation of the Egyptian pound has increased the cost of importing vehicles and components, pushing up prices and production costs. Domestic assemblers also face stiff competition from well-established global producers, particularly in Europe and Asia.

The sector has gained renewed momentum under the National Automotive Industry Strategy 2024–2030, which aims to meet growing domestic demand while creating new export revenue streams. In 2024, automotive sales in Egypt rose by 13.16% year-on-year to 102,200 units, including 81,400 passenger cars, 13,300 trucks, and 7,300 buses. Passenger car sales grew by 18% year-on-year, led by Nissan (15.9%), Chery (13.4%), Chevrolet (12.2%), Hyundai (11.4%), and Toyota (9.2%).

Vehicle imports in 2024 totaled $2.61 billion, primarily from Germany ($622.1 million), China ($595.8 million), and South Korea (US$310.8 million). The number of licensed vehicles increased by 4.7% year-on-year to 10.4 million, including 5.7 million passenger cars, 1.3 million trucks, and 174,600 buses.

== Production ==
Despite a population exceeding 100 million, Egypt’s domestic automotive production has historically struggled to meet internal demand, averaging fewer than 10,000 vehicles annually for many years. Egypt produced 45,073 vehicles in 2002, reaching a peak of 116,683 in 2010. However, political unrest following the 2011 revolution triggered a 30% decline in production, with output falling to just 36,640 vehicles by 2017.

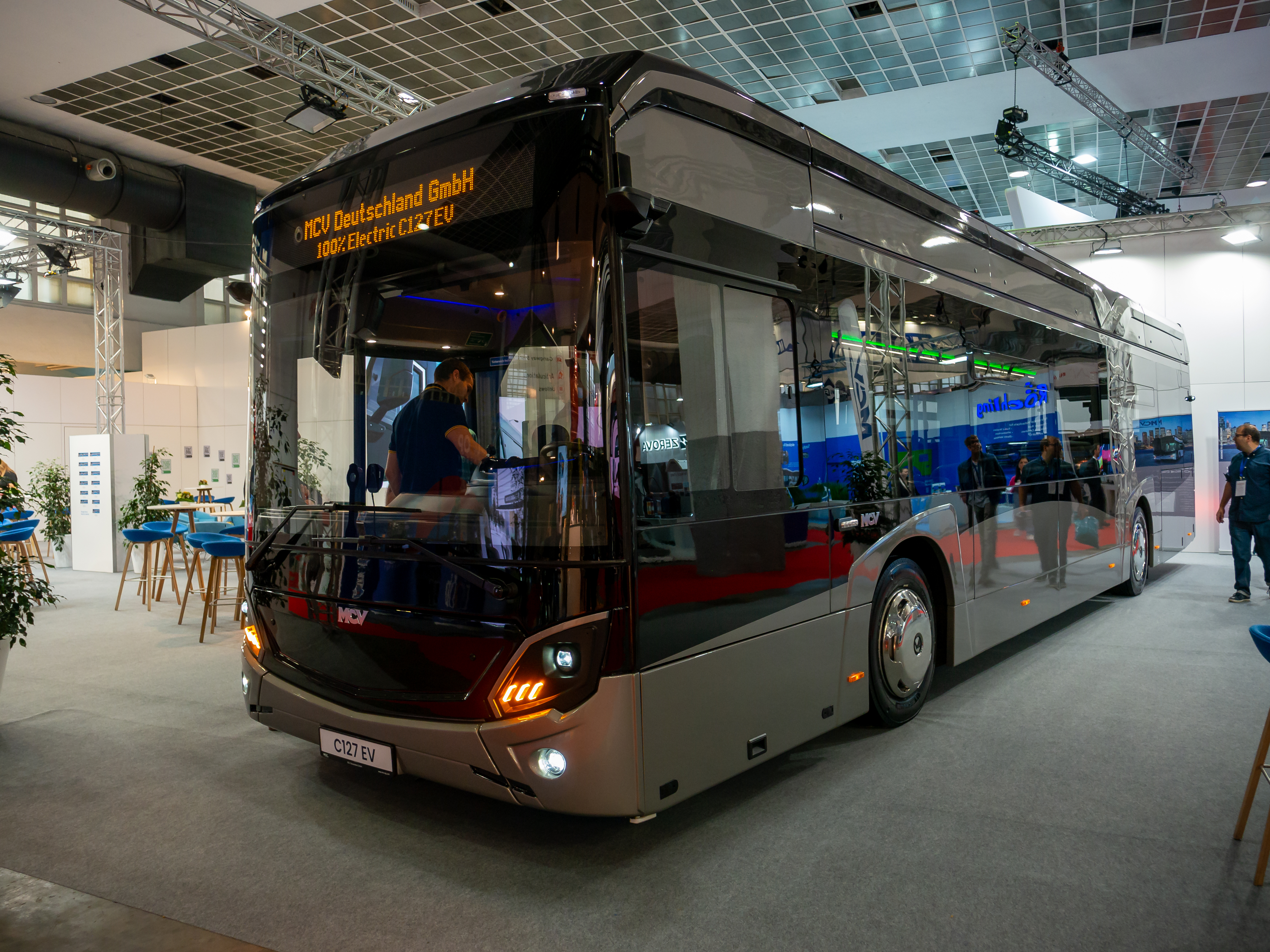
A fully electric MCV C127 EV, made in Egypt for the German market

Egypt’s automotive industry has since rebounded strongly. The growth is supported by the government’s national strategy for the automotive industry, which includes new incentives, local assembly initiatives, as well as measures to increase the domestic component ratio and position Egypt as a regional automotive hub. According to a report by BMI Autos Industry Research Egypt’s production is estimated to grow at an average annual rate of 11.4% between 2024 and 2033, reaching nearly 835,000 vehicles by the end of the forecast period, up from 37,000 in 2023. Total exports for 2023 amounted to $6 million.

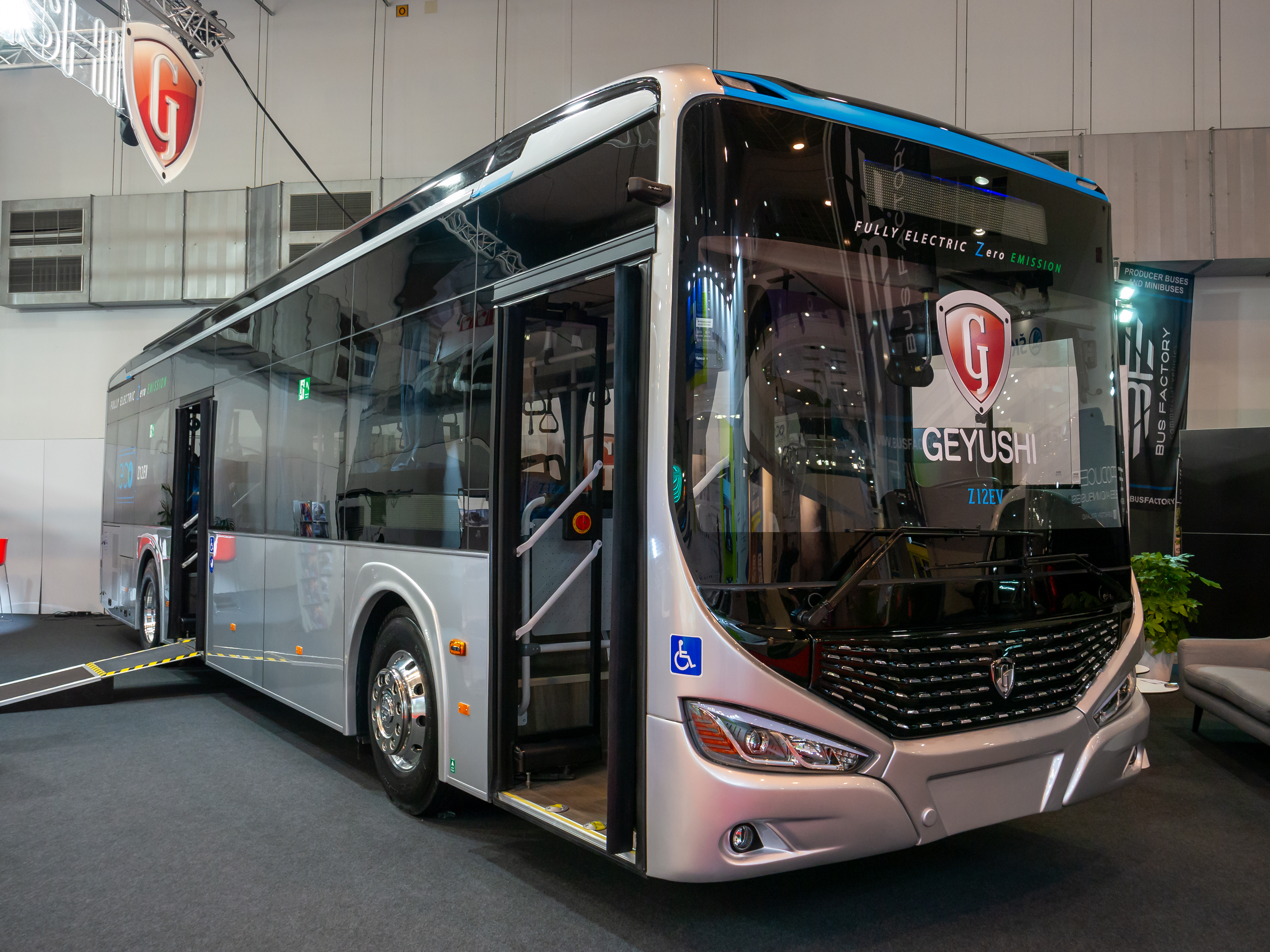
A fully electric Geyushi Z12EV

In the first nine months of 2025 car and auto component exports had reached $891 million and are projected to exceed $1 billion by year-end. The country will produce an estimated 95,000 vehicles in 2025.

In May 2025, Jetour, in partnership with El Kasrawy Group, committed $123 million to establish an assembly facility in the 6th of October. Earlier in January, Geely launched its first factory in the MENA region in Egypt.

In early November 2025, Mansour Group began construction on the MAC Automotive plant, a $150 million facility in 6th of October. The plant is planned to produce both internal-combustion and electric vehicles, with an annual capacity target of 100,000 units within five years. It is the first project in a planned automotive production city that will serve as a hub for related manufacturing and supplier industries.

In December 2025, Volkswagen announced a $240 million plan to expand electric vehicle manufacturing in Egypt, initially using Egyptian-German Automotive’s production facilities, until it builds its own factory in East Port Said.

== Car and commercial vehicle manufacturers in Egypt ==
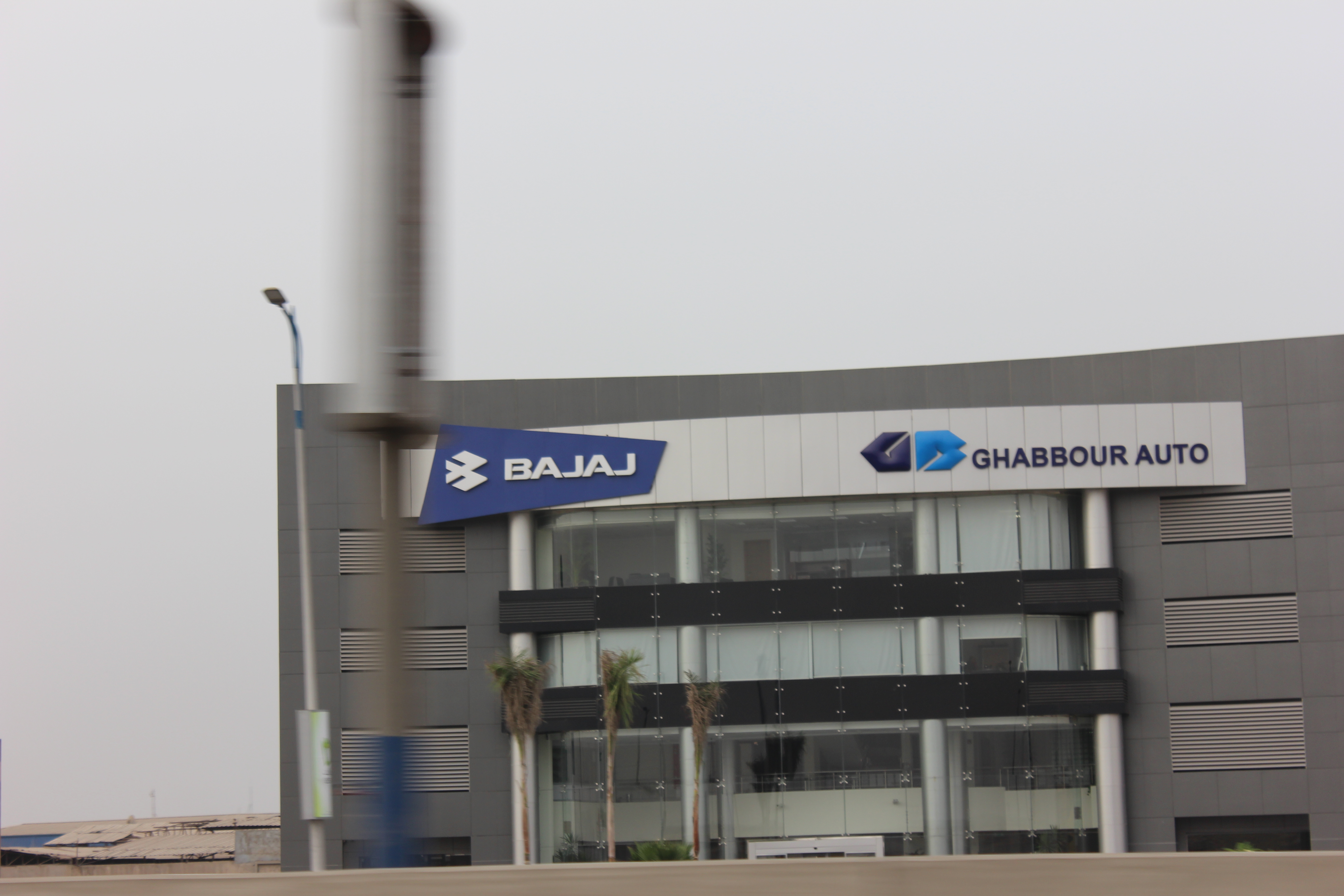
Ghabbour Auto, now operating as GB Auto under the umbrella of GB Corp

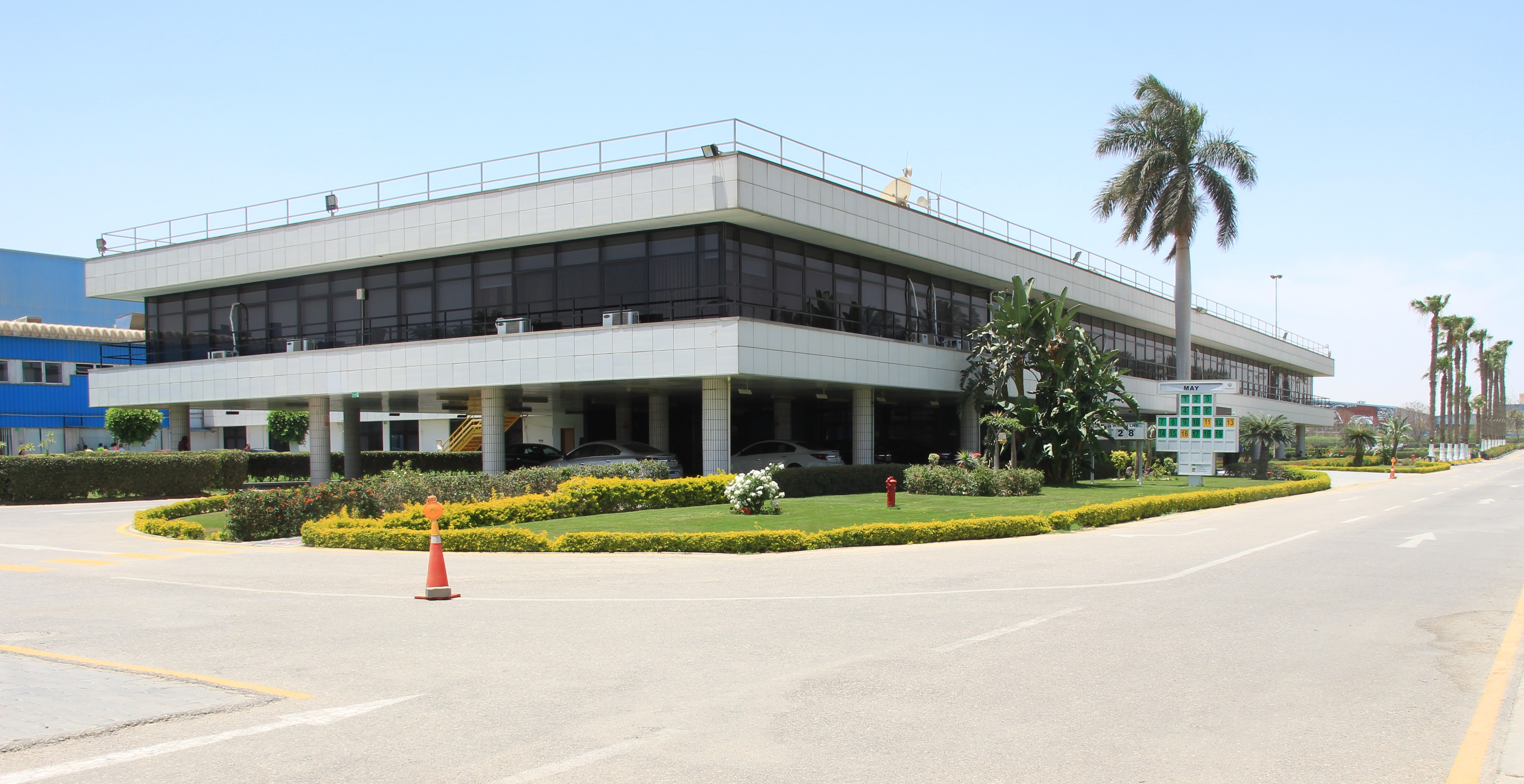
General Motors Egypt's plant in 6th of October

Company	Status	Source
Aboul Fotouh Automotive	Active	
Bavarian Auto Group	Defunct	
Speranza Motors	Defunct	
Arab Organization for Industrialization	Active	
Arab American Vehicles	Active	
Egy-Tech Engineering	Active	
Egyptian German Automotive Company	Active	
El Nasr Automotive Manufacturing Company	Active	
Tramco	Defunct	
GB Corp	Active	
Manufacturing Commercial Vehicles	Active	
MCV Bus and Coach	Active	
General Motors Egypt	Active	
Geyushi Motors	Active	
Gorica Egypt	Active	
Kasrawy Group	Active	
JAC Egypt	Active	
Kastour Egypt	Active	
MAN Egypt	Active	
Nissan Motor Egypt	Active	
Seoudi Investment Group	Active	
Suzuki Egypt	Active	
Wagih Abaza Co.	Active	
