= Automotive industry in Morocco =

The Moroccan automotive industry is led by investment by French Renault-Nissan Alliance and PSA Group car companies. BYD leads the Chinese investment in Morocco. Investment is encouraged by the Moroccan government by removing certain taxes in the first five years of an automaker's operations in order to encourage the companies to come. FIAT ended its production role in Morocco in 2003 by selling its stake in SOMACA to Renault. There is a small local manufacturing industry including Laraki.

Morocco has signed deals for 26 auto industry projects worth a total of €1.23-billion ($1.45-billion) as it seeks to build its position as an international hub for the sector. In 2017, the Government announced projects with companies from France, Spain, Italy, China, South Korea, Japan and the US, from which they expected to create more than 11 500 jobs.

Morocco expects to produce one million vehicles with a local integration rate of 80% by 2020. Against 650,000 currently, the achievement of a rate of local integration of vehicles leaving Morocco by 80% and a turnover of 10 billion euros, with the aim to create 160,000 jobs.

== Production facilities ==
=== Renault ===
The SOMACA facility in Casablanca opened in 1959 and is now 80% owned by Renault Group and 20% by PSA. It currently produces the Renault Kangoo, Dacia Logan and Dacia Sandero. The plant has a production capacity of almost 80,000 vehicles a year and employs 1,307 staff.. Production of the Renault 4 ended in 1993. The facility previously produced the 5, 12 and 18 models.

Renault-Nissan opened its Tangier facility in 2012 and manufactures the Dacia Lodgy and Dacia Dokker. It had an initial production capacity of 170,000 vehicles a year on one assembly line and employs 5,086 staff..

=== PSA Group ===
In 2015, PSA announced a €557 million investment in the new PSA Kenitra plant, scheduled to open in 2019 to produce B and C segment engines and vehicles, with an output capacity of 90,000 engines and vehicles and the potential to expand to 200,000 units.

=== FIAT ===
FIAT had previously assembled the Uno and Palio from CKD kits at the SOMACA facility. The Palio was produced from 1997 to 2003 when assembly ceased and FIAT sold its share of the factory. Previously it had also assembled the 127 and 131 in the early 1980s.

=== BYD ===
BYD, "Build Your Dreams," becomes the third automaker to establish a major automobile manufacturing presence in Morocco. BYD hopes to benefit from Morocco's location as a gateway to Europe and the African market.

== Renault's production in Morocco ==
The French auto-maker Renault-Nissan, that decided to invest in the north of Morocco specifically in a small city called Melloussa. The city is considered a strategic one because it is a half hour away from the largest Moroccan port of Tanger-Med and that facilitate much of the transportation of new made cars and get them as soon as possible to the port for export whether to Europe or to some countries in the MENA region. Renault-Nissan have decided to invest an amount of around 10 billion dirhams (almost €1 billion) in order to bring this factory to life. According to the former Moroccan industry minister Moulay Hafid Elalami, Renault-Nissan is aiming to build an "industry ecosystem". This "industry ecosystem" according to him will attract many other companies that specialise in making certain auto-parts to come and invest in the same region in Morocco in order for them to supply Renault-Nissan with parts that will be on the final car. The minister claims that this creates an amount of money projected at 20 billion dirhams (almost €2 billion).

According to the company, the factory will start first by making 48 870 vehicle in the first year and that it will reach according to prediction to an amount of more than 250,000 vehicles by 2015. The company also has put a strategy by moving to an amount of 400,000 vehicles made in a single year by offering some benefits to workers to work on week-ends. The company in 2015 announced that it surpassed its predictions by making more than 288 053 vehicles achieving an increase of 26%. The factory also has mentioned that most of its production is the making of the Dacia Sandero since it has received a great success concerning sales especially here in Morocco and France. The cost of one vehicle is around $11 000 (around €8000) which made it to be sold in large amounts due to its low price. According to the company, the Sandero represent almost 50% of the company's production, almost 140 000 units are made each year, followed then by the Dacia Dokker that represent 25% of the production. There is also the Dacia Logan that's been representing 14% of the total factory production since almost 41 000 units have been produced, and then the Dacia Lodgy representing 11% of the total production by almost 32 663 units produced. However the production of the Dacia Lodgy have witnessed an increase since there is a higher demand for it in the Moroccan market especially since the "Grand Taxis" now are forced to switch from the old Mercedes to a new car that is more environment friendly. Concerning employment, the group Renault-Nissan has announced that 10 000 people have been employed directly within the company in both the Tangier Factory and the SOMACA one in Casablanca, and that is in the second year of the inauguration of the company. The company claim that the hiring percentage has increased by 20.6% in only one year and is expected to keep on rising almost every year, due to the current higher demand on the company's product. The company is focusing on exporting almost all of the products made here in Morocco to Europe and some countries in the MENA region, currently the company is exporting cars to more than 22 countries around the globe and are aiming to increase this number by 2020. The factory in Tangier exports almost 94% of its cars abroad compared to the 68% of the export in the Casablanca Somaca factory. Renault-Nissan currently controls almost 38% of the Moroccan market share and is aiming at increasing its production and quality simultaneously with their product prices in order to attract more customers and try to gain more market share at least there locally.

In order for the Renault-Nissan factory to be fully operational, it had many guarantees from the Moroccan government and some funding in certain areas. Morocco had to fulfill certain promises made to the company in order for it to come invest in the country. The Moroccan government had promised the financing of a center that will enable the new workers to gain knowledge about the work they will be doing in the factory, Morocco also had set up all the necessary infrastructure that will facilitate all the logistic needed for the new cars to reach the Tanger-med port, Morocco has set up a new small highway and a new rail line that will link the factory to the port. The reason for all of this is for Morocco to develop a new automotive industry in the kingdom since the government believes that those types of industries will create many jobs and will also more companies as mentioned earlier to invest in the country that will create some car parts.

== Revenues from the investment for the Moroccan government ==
This big investment by the French company in Morocco according to the Moroccan minister of industry will generate when all of the projects whether from the Renault-Nissan or from the other companies that's going to invest around it are completed will generate a capital of 20 billion dirhams (€1.8 billion). The French company also is aiming at tripling its spending on the car parts that it buys from other companies that make those parts on Moroccan soil which will help create an additional 50,000 new jobs. The French automotive investment in Morocco was mainly aiming at developing a new industry in the country that is pictured in all the companies that got created after the main stone is put which is the large Renault-Nissan Factory. At the moment since the creation of the factory in Tangier, more than 170 factories were created in order to meet the demand of car parts by it, and this so far has generated 50 billion dirhams (almost €4.5 billion) in revenues and so far has created more than 90,000 direct and indirect jobs.

For the first time in Moroccan economic history, this new automotive industry investment in Melloussa close to Tangier has boomed the Moroccan exports to a point it even surpassed the phosphates exports. Morocco now has become an exporter of automobiles and automotive parts and is now supplying many countries in the region and in Europe, the new factory in tangier changed almost the life of people living nearby, whether by hiring new technicians, new managers, new engineers, a security company etc. all of those new job creations lead to the creation of a small wealth since the company pays 25% higher than the Moroccan minimum wage, and now the local people there have at least a source of income and have now money to spend and this help the local economy improve. Before the creation of the company there was nothing in the neighbouring area, now there are new high standard roads, a small new highway linking the factory o the port, a new high school and a new residency for students studying in the high school. According to the current Director of Renault Paul Carvalho the village of Melloussa will soon be the richest village in the near future thanks to the Renault-Nissan Factory.

== Future investment in the automotive industry ==
Seeing from this investment's success, Morocco tends to expand its automotive industry so it can keep increasing its exports, lately a final deal has been reached between the Moroccan government and Group Peugeot-Citroën that leads to the creation of a new factory near Kenitra with an investment of 6 billion dirhams (€557 million). Morocco currently is aiming at exporting $10 billion a year by 2020 only from the auto industry. All of this will affect the Moroccan economy heavily, since first it will raise the industrial sector of the GDP to 20%. Those investments from both Renault and Peugeot-Citroën will attract more companies to come and invest in the country seeing from the success Renault has achieved and from the future success that Peugeot-Citroën will witness. The new upcoming big investment mentioned previously would be the new Peugeot-Citroën factory, the new company is aiming at producing 200 000 vehicle within its first years of being operational in the kingdom. The new Peugeot-Citroën factory plant will start making small cost cars aimed for emerging economies selling them at a reasonable price, Peugeot is mainly targeting African countries and countries in the Middle East. The new plant will also hire 4500 workers by the time it reaches its aimed production which is 200 000 car, this number will also raise in the upcoming years once all the ground is ready for it. One important aspect of the new plant is that the company will make the engine here in Morocco rather than import parts and assemble them, the new company also agreed to spend 13 billion dirhams (around €1 billion) on automotive parts that are produced locally in the country, all of this will help the Moroccan economy move forward since many Moroccan companies will have new buyers of their products.

== Effects on the Moroccan GDP ==
Currently the automotive industry in the kingdom represents around a 16% share of total Moroccan GDP, but this will increase to 20% once Peugeot becomes operational and ramps up production. According to the minister of industry, Moulay Hafid El Alami, Morocco will continue to attract and persuade foreign investors to invest in this sector, he says that now he is hoping that other car and truck makers will decide to come and invest so that the automotive industry exports will double. The minister claim that his ministry has been in "serious and fruitful" talks with some other automobile companies especially some Italian and American ones in order to persuade them to come. Some giant companies such as FIAT-Chrysler and Ford are among the companies that feel like investing in the Moroccan automobile industry, currently as stated previously they are In talks with the Moroccan Government in order for them to have all the necessary guarantees and how they will proceed with taxes etc. in order for those two giants to start building their factories here in the country. Currently the new Moroccan car industry has moved beyond expectations and reached records especially when it comes to export. It has now surpassed phosphate exports revenues and it also surpassed other total agricultural products. Proving this with numbers, Morocco's export in the auto industry have reached 35 billion dirhams (around €3 billion) compared to the phosphate exports which is 34 billion dirhams (around €2.9 billion) and agricultural products with 31 billion dirhams (around €2.7 billion). With Peugeot entering the market, Morocco will reach 600,000 automobiles made locally annually and the number is expected to reach one million in the next few years.
