= Plaxton Panther =

Plaxton Panther Plaxton Paragon
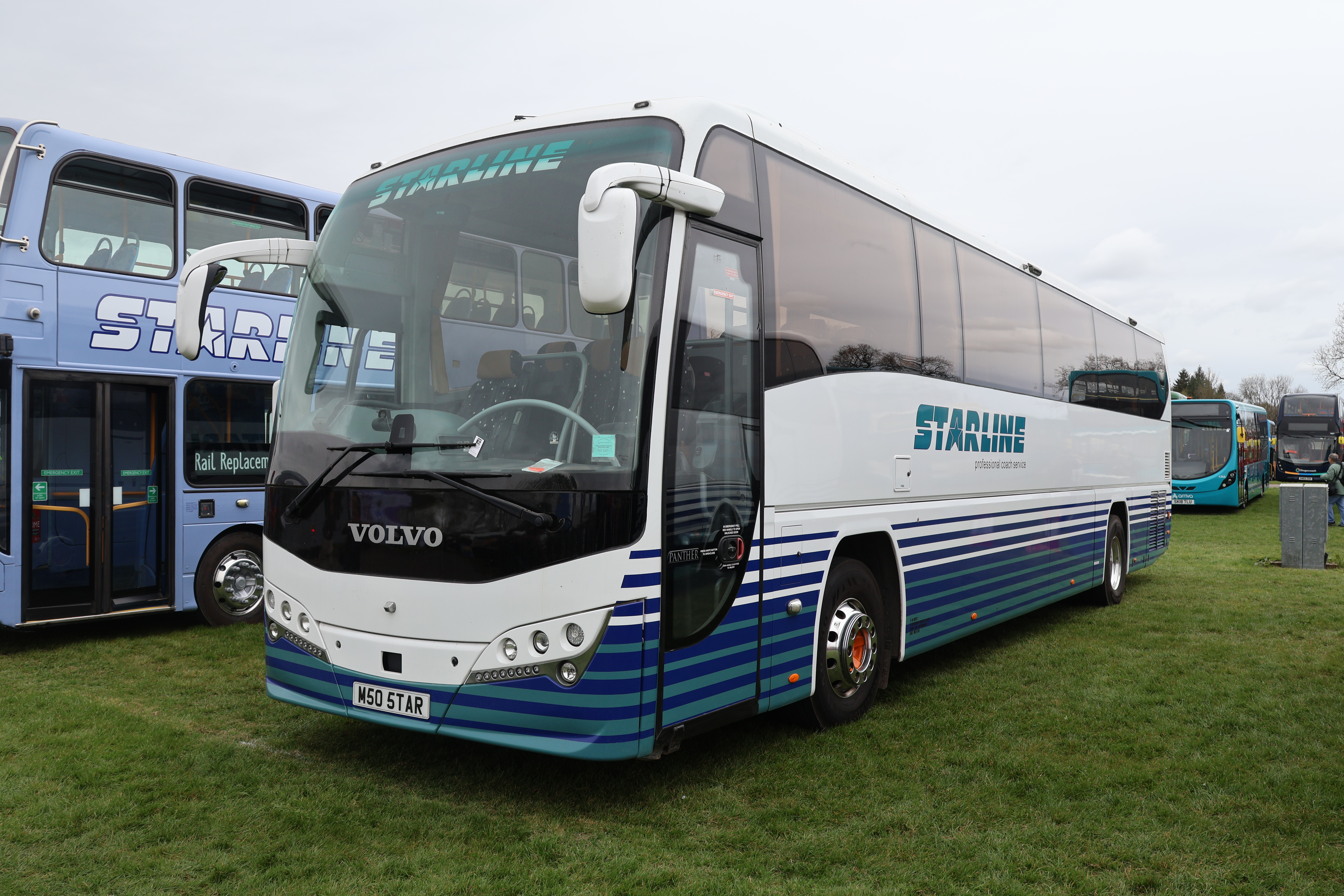
- Starline Coaches Plaxton Panther 3 bodied Volvo B11R at the 2026 South East Bus Festival

Overview
- Manufacturer: Plaxton
- Production: 1999 – 2010 (1st generation & Paragon); 2010 – 2024 (2nd generation); 2012 – 2024 (Panther Cub); 2013 – 2024 (3rd generation)
- Assembly: Scarborough, North Yorkshire, England

Body and chassis
- Class: Bus bodywork
- Body style: Single-decker coach
- Doors: 1
- Floor type: Step-entrance
- Chassis: Dennis; Iveco; MAN; Scania; Volvo

Powertrain
- Capacity: 53–70 seated

Chronology
- Predecessor: Plaxton Premiere & Excalibur

The Plaxton Panther and Plaxton Paragon are closely related designs of coach bodywork built by Plaxton in Scarborough, North Yorkshire, England, between 1999 and 2024.

For part of their design life, Plaxton was part of TransBus International, during which time the designs were officially referred to as the TransBus Paragon and TransBus Panther.

The Paragon and Panther replaced the Premiere and Excalibur respectively, with the Paragon being the standard and the Panther the premium specification coach. Externally, the main distinguishing feature between the two models is the front end, which is more upright on the Paragon, although the difference is not as pronounced as that between the Premiere and Excalibur.

One important new feature of the designs was the use of a stainless steel structure, to resist corrosion and prolong vehicle life expectancy.

The Generation 2 Panther was launched at Euro Bus Expo at Birmingham in November 2010. It shares some of the external design with the Plaxton Elite and will comply with the new European WVTA requirements as well as the older domestic Certificate of initial fitness (COIF) standards. New 12.8m version will be available on Volvo B9R with 53 seats. The Generation 2 15m Panther will be built on the Volvo B13RT for Megabus with 65 seats and the latest PLS lift. Production of the Paragon ceased at this time, with the final examples registered during the autumn of 2010.

The Panther Cub is a short wheelbase version launched in 2013.

The Generation 3 Panther launched in September 2013 and is a more substantial facelift with a similar rear to the Elite and new headlights similar to the Elite Interdeck. The Panther LE low floor version was launched in May 2018 on the Volvo B8RLE chassis with Stagecoach East Scotland purchasing 19.

== Suspension of production ==
In March 2024, Alexander Dennis announced that production of all Plaxton coaches would be suspended for at least two years, owing to factory capacity being required for the Enviro EV range of buses. In speculating whether production of any existing models might resume, Mark Williams, writing in Bus & Coach Buyer, noted that the Panther was "a much-liked coach", but also "rather long in the tooth, with origins going back to 1999".

== Gallery ==
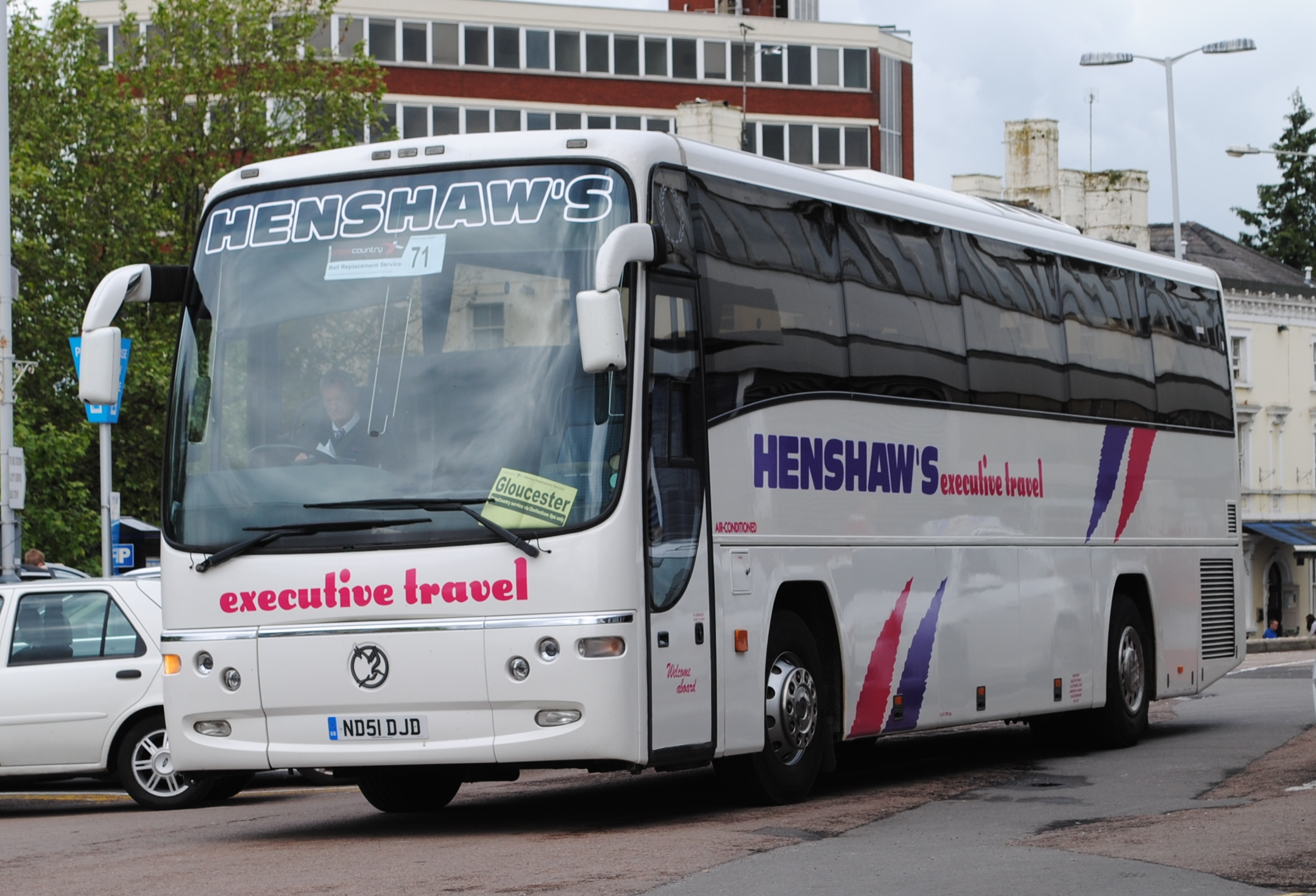
Henshaws Plaxton Panther bodied Dennis in May 2016

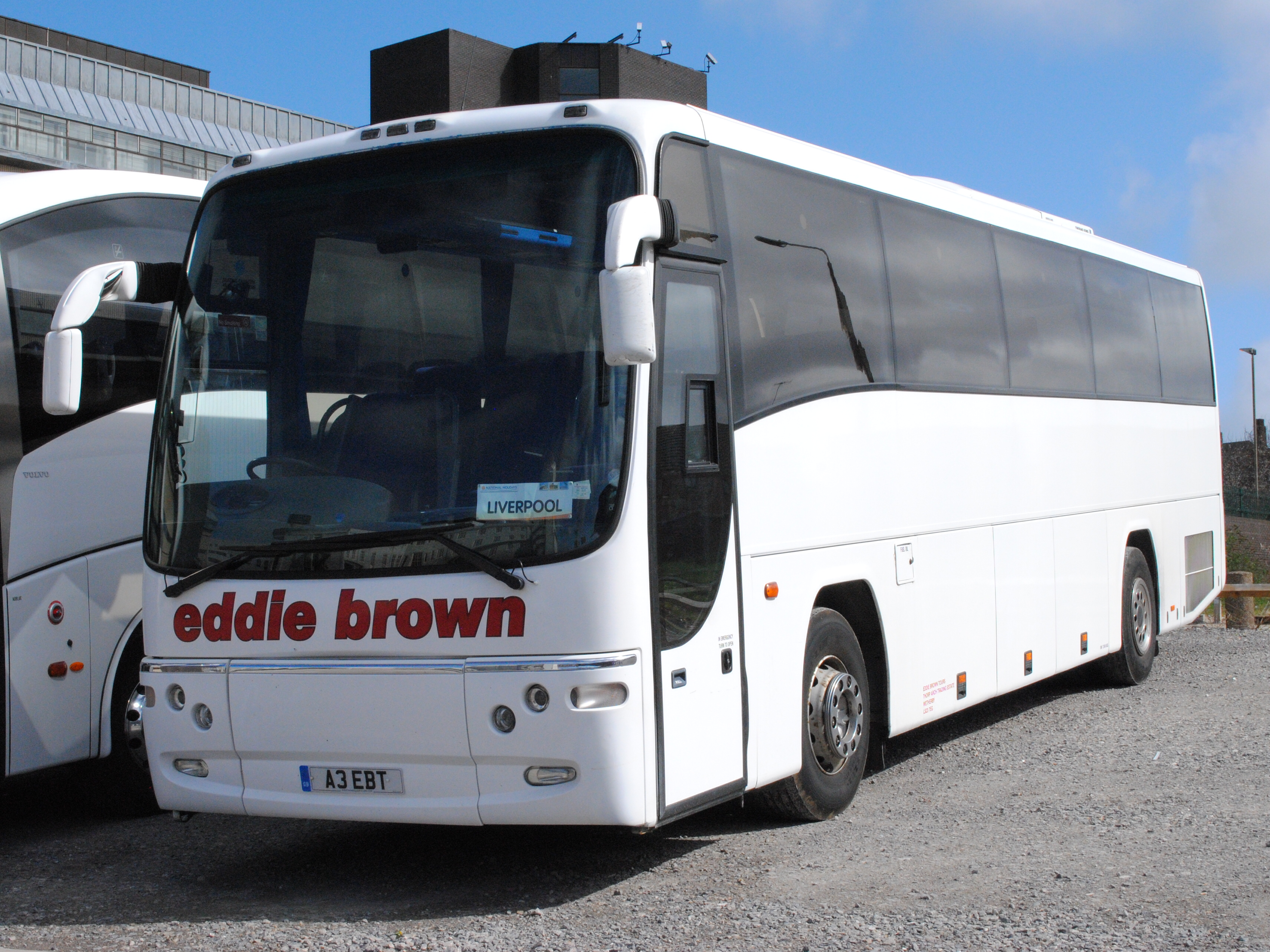
Eddie Brown Plaxton Panther bodied Volvo B12B in April 2013

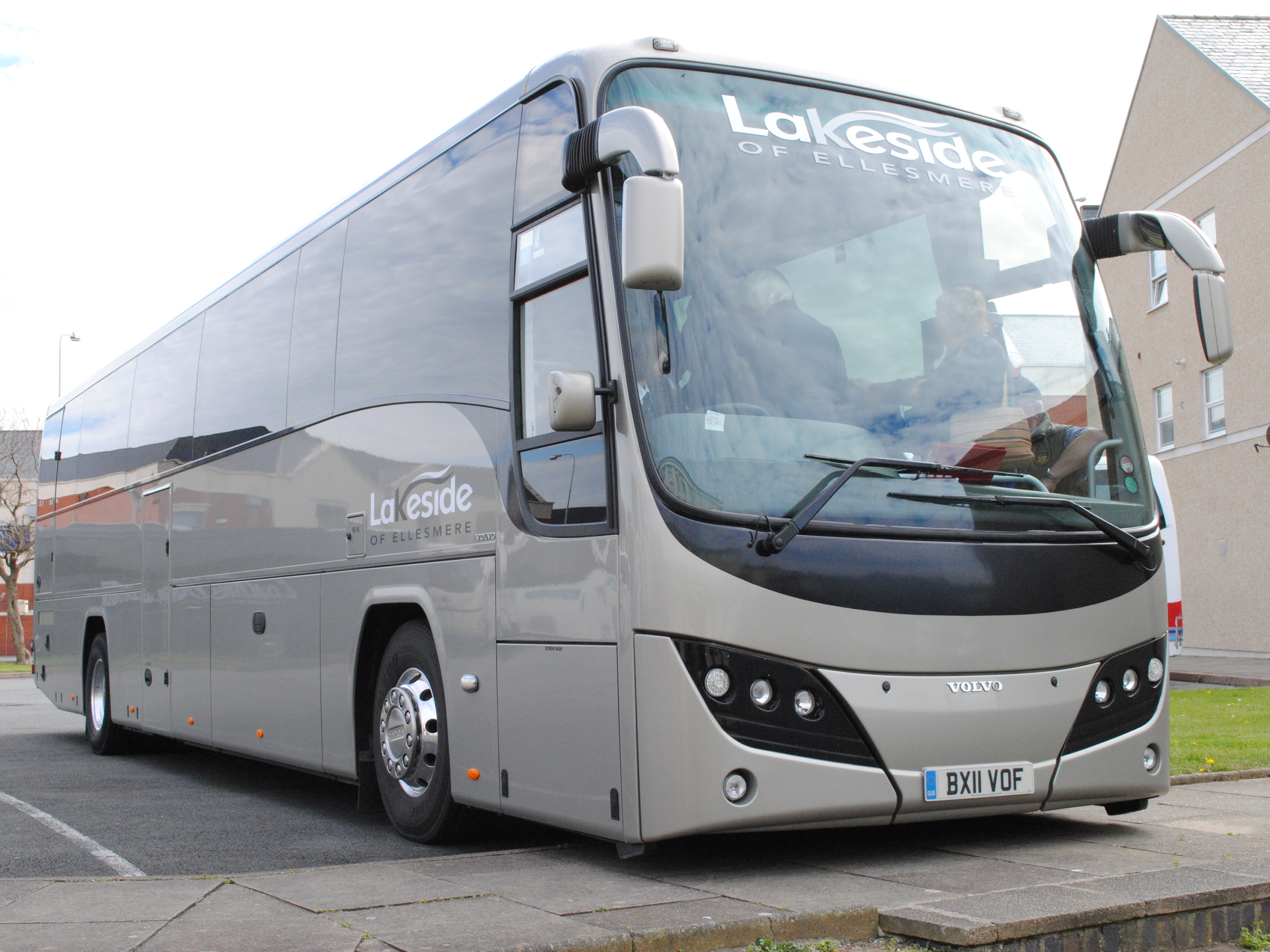
Lakeside of Ellesmere Plaxton Panther 2 bodied Volvo B12B in May 2013

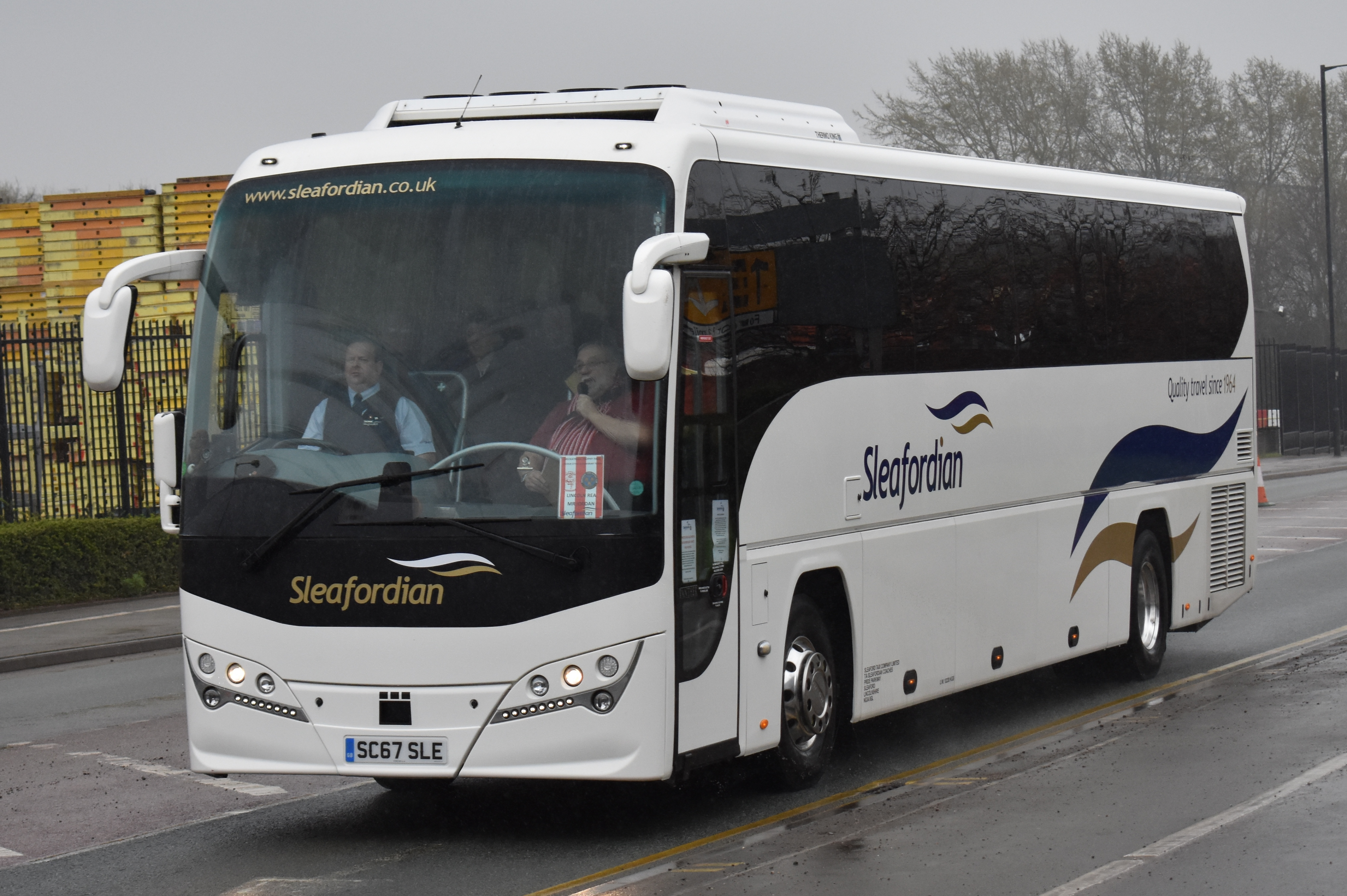
Sleafordian Coachees Plaxton Panther 3 bodied Volvo B8R in April 2018
