= Caetano Levante =

Coach body

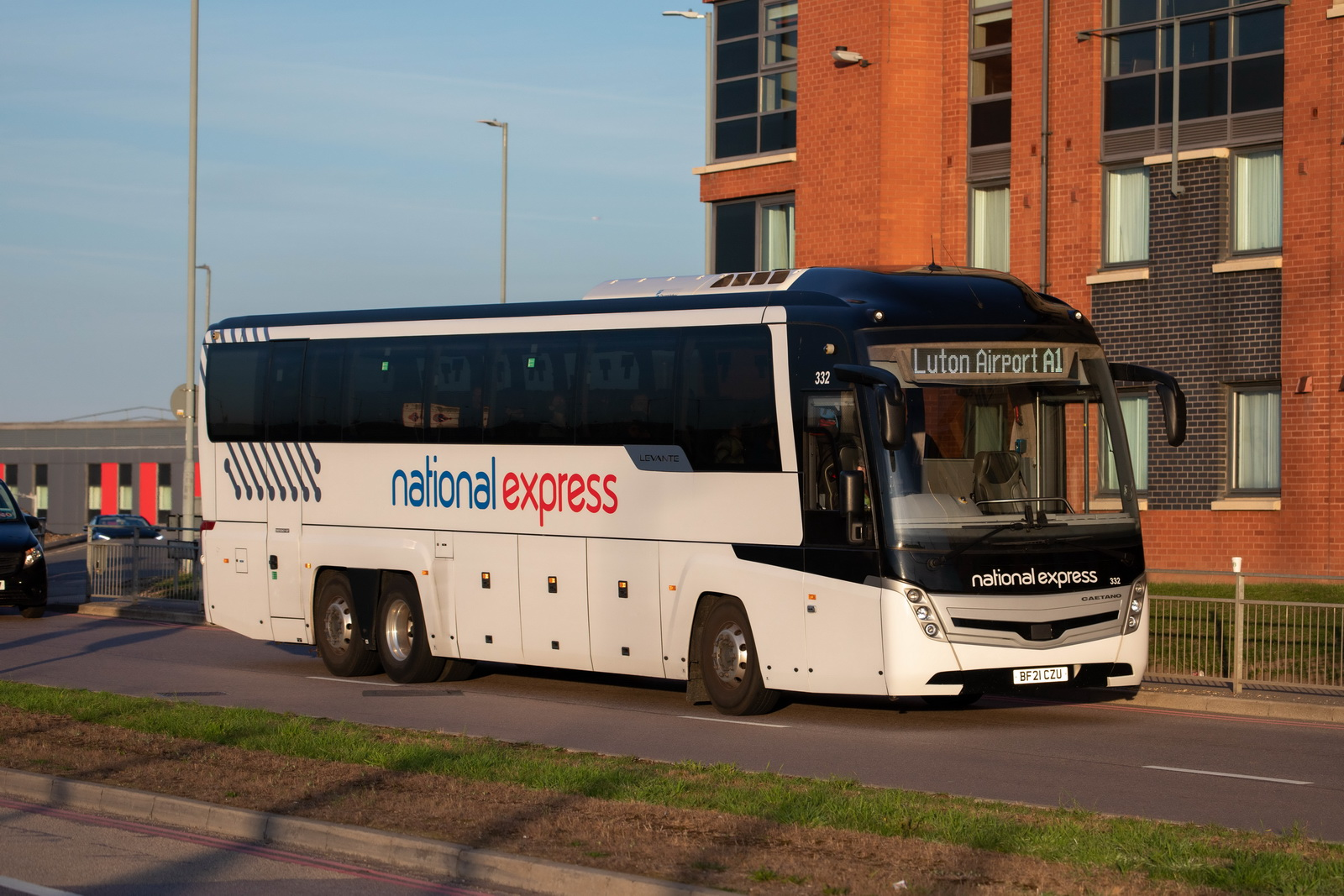
- National Express Scania K410EB6-engined Caetano Levante III at Luton Airport

Overview
- Manufacturer: Salvador Caetano
- Also called: Caetano Winner; Caetano CT650; Caetano Voyager
- Production: 2007-present
- Assembly: Coalville, Leicestershire, England

Body and chassis
- Body style: Executive Coach
- Doors: 1
- Floor type: Step entrance, wheelchair access at entrance using a lift
- Chassis: Mercedes-Benz OC 500 RF; Scania K EB; Volvo B8R; Volvo B9R; Volvo B11R; Volvo B12B; Volvo B13R

Powertrain
- Transmission: Volvo I-Shift 12-speed ZF Ecomat automatic Scania Opticruise

Dimensions
- Length: 12.60 m (41 ft 4 in) (2 axles); 14.20–14.90 m (46 ft 7 in – 48 ft 11 in) (3 axles)
- Width: 2.55 m (8 ft 4 in)
- Height: 3.70 m (12 ft 2 in)

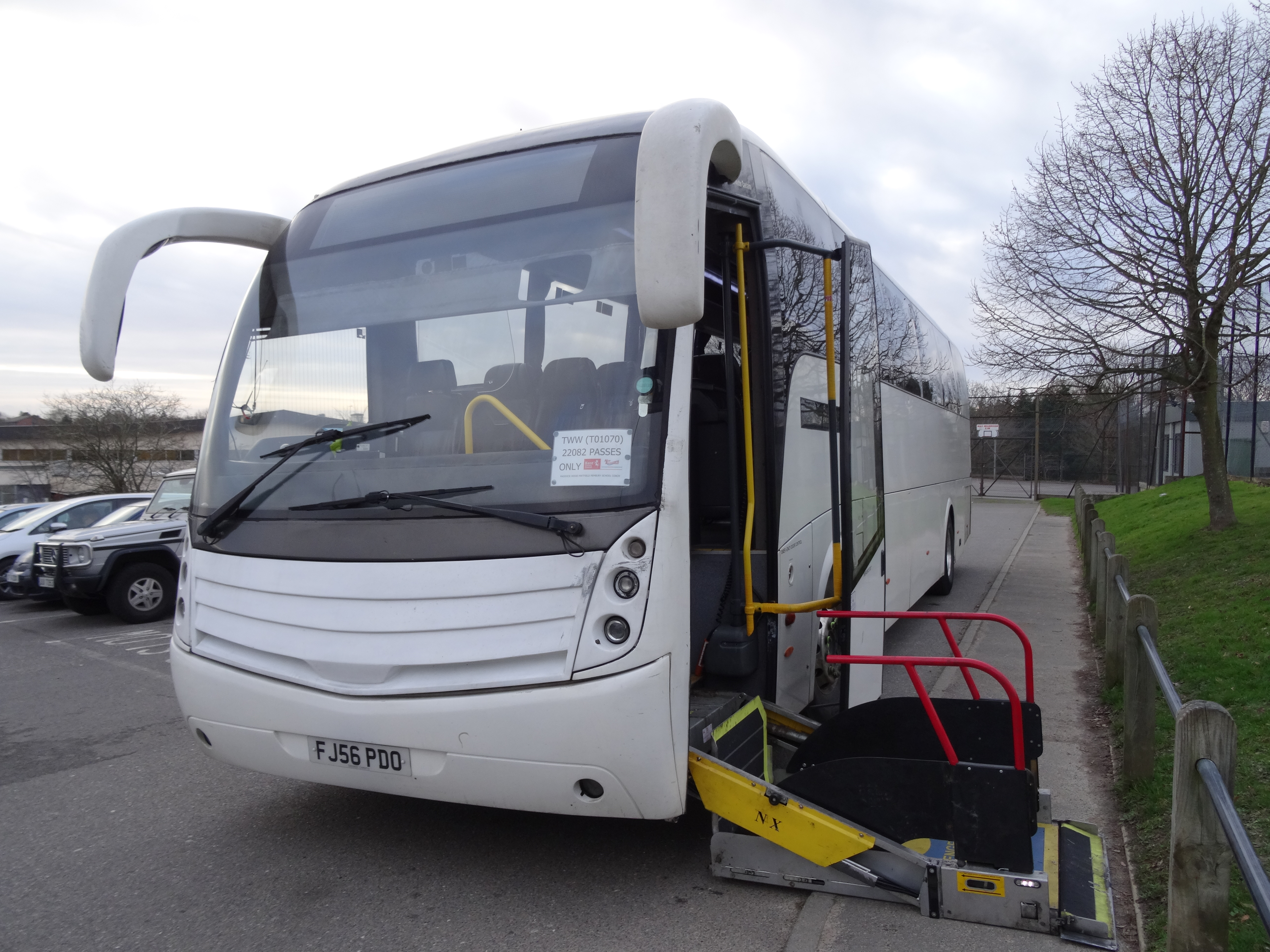
Levante I with lowered wheelchair lift

The Caetano Levante is a coach body built by Salvador Caetano compatible with Mercedes-Benz OC 500 RF, Scania K EB, Volvo B8R, Volvo B9R, Volvo B11R, Volvo B12B and Volvo B13R chassis, with units built mostly for National Express in the United Kingdom. It was specifically designed to comply with the Disability Discrimination Act 2005.

Originally only available on the Volvo B12B chassis, the Levante enabled both able-bodied and wheelchair passengers to enter the vehicle via the front door, using a combination of a front-mounted lift and two single pedestal-mounted seats in place of the traditional double at the front nearside of the passenger area. The Levante is used by most National Express contractors, although some contractors continued purchasing Plaxton Elites.

This model is similar to a Portuguese market model, Caetano Winner, which was presented in 2004 and was born from a collaboration with Evobus with the first units being equipped with Mercedes-Benz OC500 chassis, but other manufacturers' chassis can be applied. Levante bodies which are not built new for National Express work are known as CT650s.

== Design ==
=== Levante III ===
In September 2017, the Levante III was launched with prototypes built for National Express contractors Edwards Coaches on a Volvo B11R and Skills Coaches on a Scania.

An upgraded variant named the Levante IIIA was launched by Caetano and National Express in December 2022. Built on a new Scania 'Step E' chassis suitable for a potential electric drivetrain and featuring a new front end module and suspension, the Levante IIIA is equipped with camera mirrors replacing the traditional mirror arms, warning sensors for road and blindspot hazards, and a new cab area layout. Two Levante IIIAs were operated on trial by Clarkes of London and Bruce's Coaches before the type began to be rolled out across the National Express coaching fleet from spring 2023.

==== Caetano eLevante ====
The Caetano eLevante, a right-hand drive Levante IIIA on battery electric Scania chassis, fitted with a 330 kW electric motor mated to a four-speed automatic gearbox and capable of a range of up to 600 kilometres (370 mi), was launched at the 2025 Busworld expo in Brussels in October 2025.
