= Volvo 9700 =

Range of coaches manufactured by Volvo

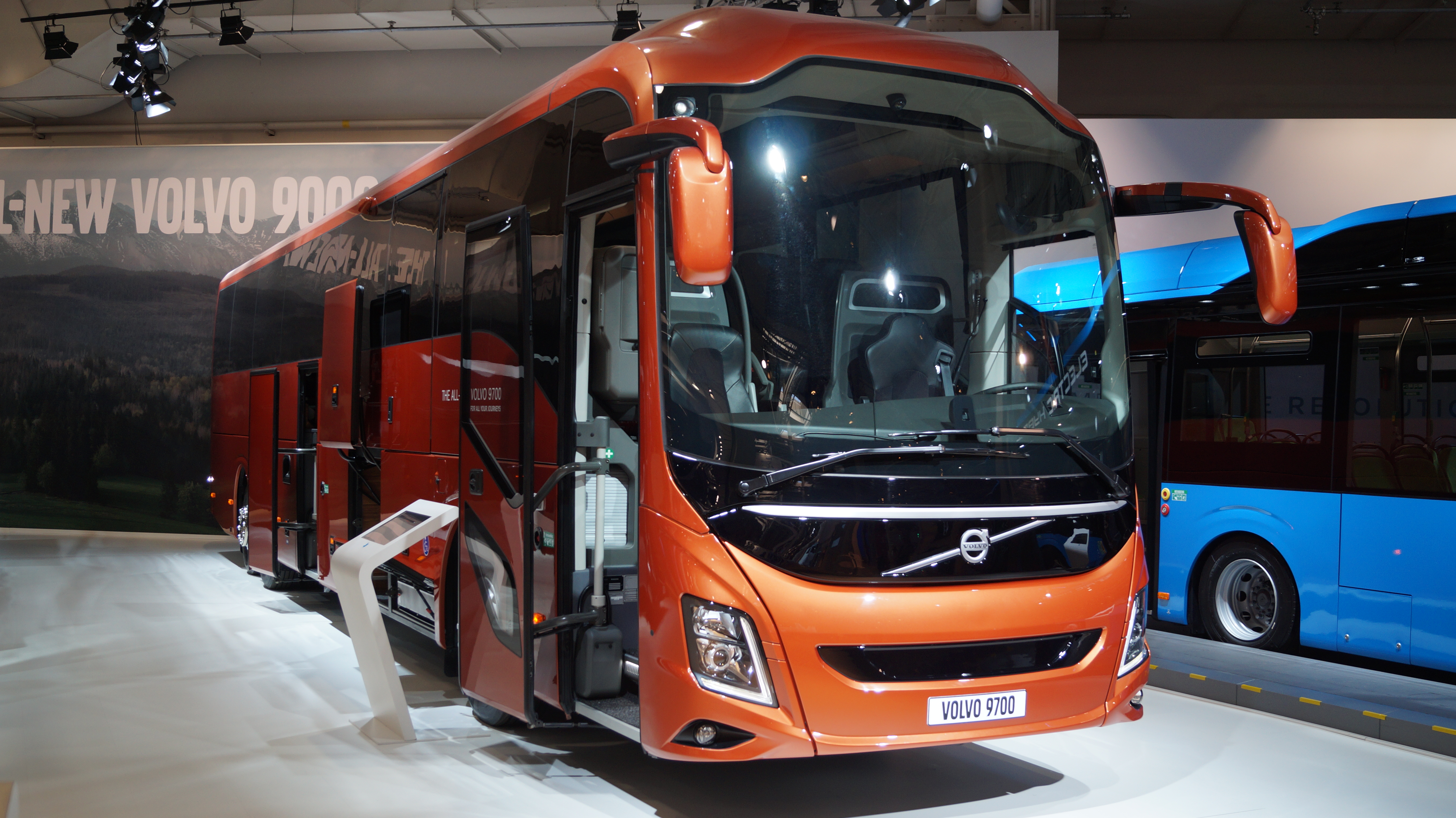
- Volvo 9700 (2018)

Overview
- Manufacturer: Volvo
- Production: 2001–present
- Assembly: Lieto, Finland; Tampere, Finland (-2008); Wrocław, Poland; Tultitlan, Mexico (-2016)

Body and chassis
- Class: Commercial vehicle
- Body style: Coach
- Doors: 1-1-0, 1-0-1, 1-2-0
- Floor type: Step entrance
- Chassis: Volvo B12B, B12M, B7R, B9R, B13R, B11R, B8R

Dimensions
- Length: 10.3–15.0 m
- Width: 2.55 m
- Height: 9700S: 3.42 m 9700H: 3.61 m 9700HD: 3.73 m

Chronology
- Predecessor: Star 302, Star 502, Star 602; Vector 330, Regal 350, Volvo 7550
- Successor: Volvo 9800 (Mexican market)

The Volvo 9700 is a range of coaches manufactured by Volvo. It was introduced in 2001 as a replacement for the Carrus Star and Vector/Regal models. There are three main models in different heights; 9700S (3.42 m), 9700H (3.61 m) and 9700HD (3.73 m). The 9700S is available only in the Nordic countries. In addition there is the stripped down 9500 and the 9900 with theater seating. The coaches come in a variety of lengths up to 15 metres, depending on models and markets. Volvo 9700 is currently sold in most of Europe and North America (including Canada, United States and Mexico). In 2015, the Volvo 9800 was launched as a replacement for the 9700 in the Mexican market, followed by the double-decker 9800DD in March 2018.

== First generation (2001–07) ==
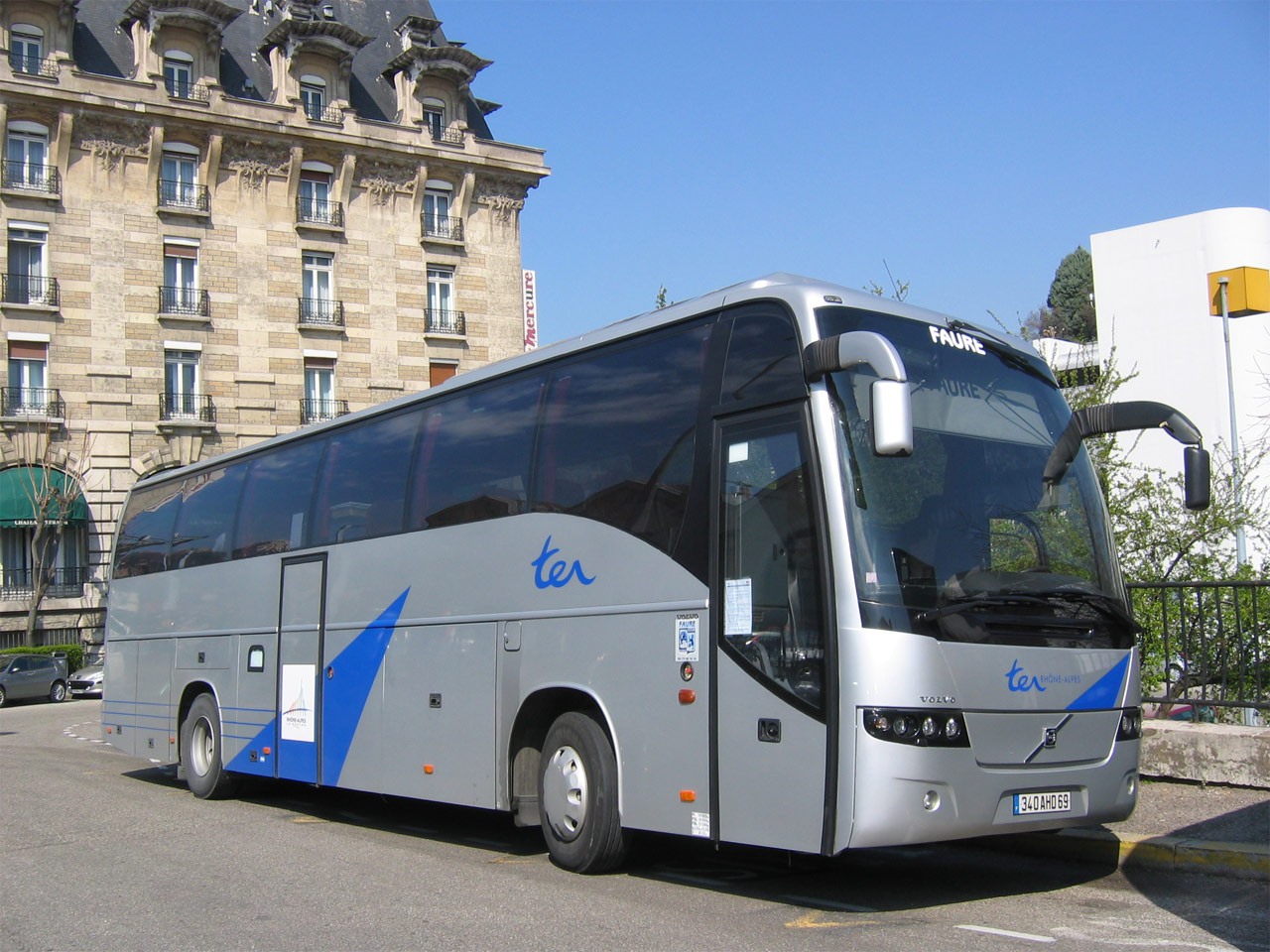
First generation Volvo 9700HD in France.

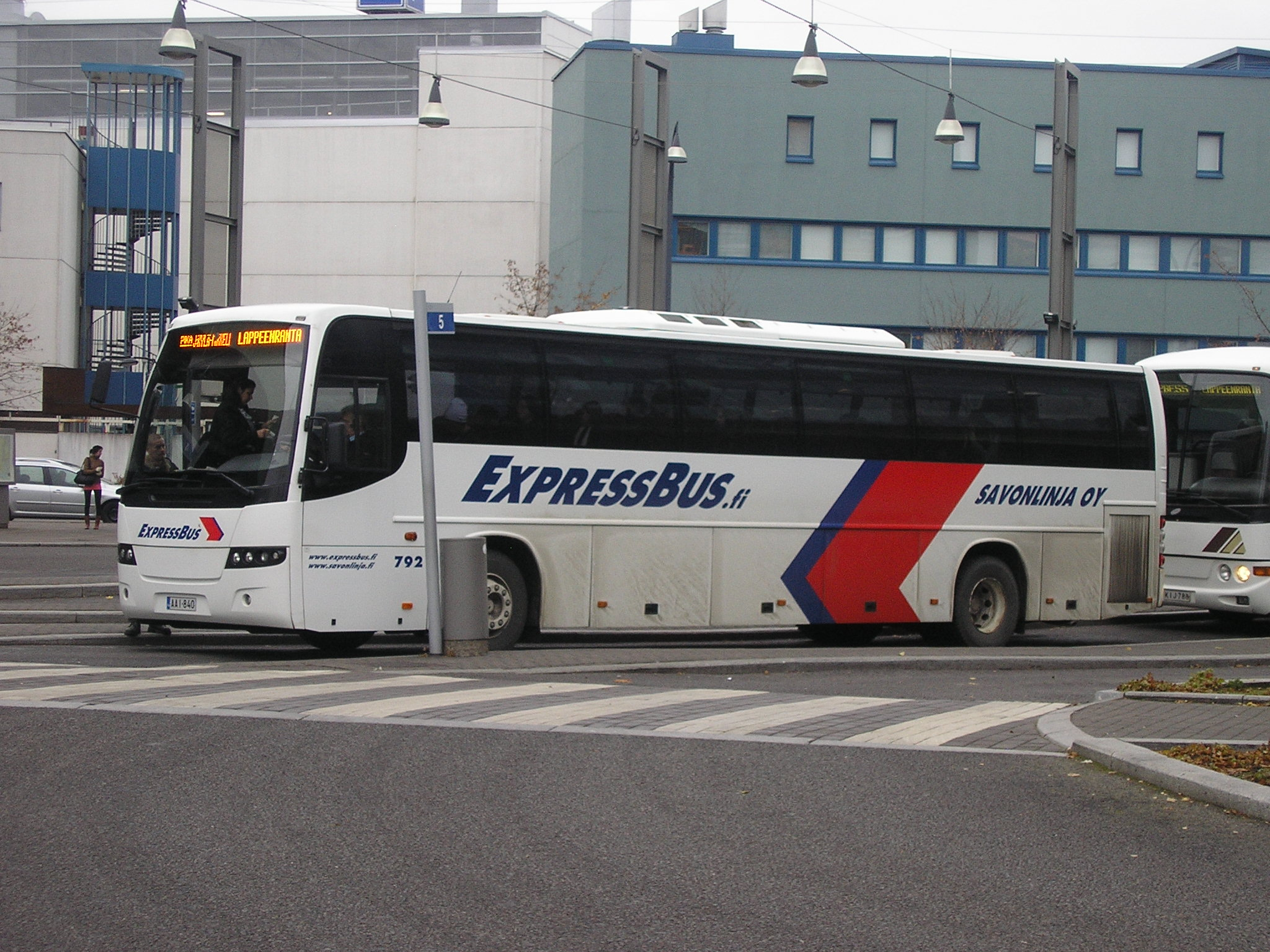
Volvo 9700S on a B7R in Jyväskylä in October 2009.

Carrus had for many years great success in the Nordic countries with the Star model range descending from the Delta Star and also the Vector/Regal model range from Ajokki. After Carrus was acquired by Volvo in 1998 the models also came available in other European countries under a variety of different names like Volvo 7450 and 7550. In 2001 Volvo gathered all the different models to one name, Volvo 9700, and on one single platform, the Volvo TX, inheriting most of the visual characteristics from the Star models. Serial production of 9700H and 9700HD started in the summer of 2001, while 9700S came into production in the autumn. All three heights were built by Carrus Oy Delta in Lieto, while Carrus Oy Ajokki in Tampere only built 9700H and 9700S. In 2003 production also started at Volvo Polska Sp. z o.o. in Wrocław, Poland, where only 9700H and 9700HD are built. Ever since the start the plants in Finland have served the Nordic markets, while the Wrocław plant has served the rest of Europe, including the UK. As always there has been a few exceptions to this rule for various reasons.

For the Nordic markets they were fitted on both B12B (rear-engine) and B12M (mid-engine) chassis, with both configurations proving to be nearly equally popular. The B12M being the most popular among old Volvo customers, while the B12B became the choice for new customers. Many customers who earlier had their Carruses built on Scania or Mercedes-Benz chassis chose to become Volvo customers to still be able to get their coach body of choice. In the Wrocław plant they were built on B12B only. Even if not being a general offer, a small batch of 9700S were built on B7R chassis in 2004 for a Finnish operator. Also a very small number of the first generation 9700 were built on B9R chassis, but this may have been entirely for testing.

There is also a difference between the Finnish-built and the Polish-built 9700s when it comes to lengths. While they build it to just about any custom length in Finland, those built in Poland are limited to a set of standard lengths; 12 m, 13 m, 13.8 m and 15 m. From the beginning the Nordic 9700S and 9700H were available as two-axle between 12.0 m and 13.7 m, and as tri-axle up to 15.0 m. However, in 2003 the European Union and European Economic Area limited the maximum length of a two-axle vehicle to 13.5 m, also affecting these models. The 9700HD as a tri-axle came in lengths between 13.0 m and 15.0 m, and as a two-axle they came in lengths around 12 m and a super-short 10.32 m, which was only available on the mid-engine B12M chassis.

In 2004 the model received a minor facelift. That year the Finnish plants were renamed; the Tampere plant became Volvo Bus Finland Oy Tampere Factory and the Lieto plant became Volvo Bus Finland Oy Turku Factory. Turku being the nearest city to Lieto.

Non-Volvo chassis, Star 503/603

In 2001 and 2002, the body model was also available on other chassis as the Carrus Star 503 (9700H) and Star 603 (9700HD) in Finland, Sweden and Norway. A handful of Star 503 were built on Scania K114EB/K124EB and Scania K114IB/K124IB chassis. In Norway they were all sold as Scania Classic. Two Star 503 were built on Mercedes-Benz OC500RF for Norwegian operator TIRB. Only two Star 603 are known to have been built on Scania chassis. A K124EB 6x2 to Norway in summer of 2001 and a K124EB 4x2 to Finland in early 2002.

== Second generation, NG (2006–13) ==
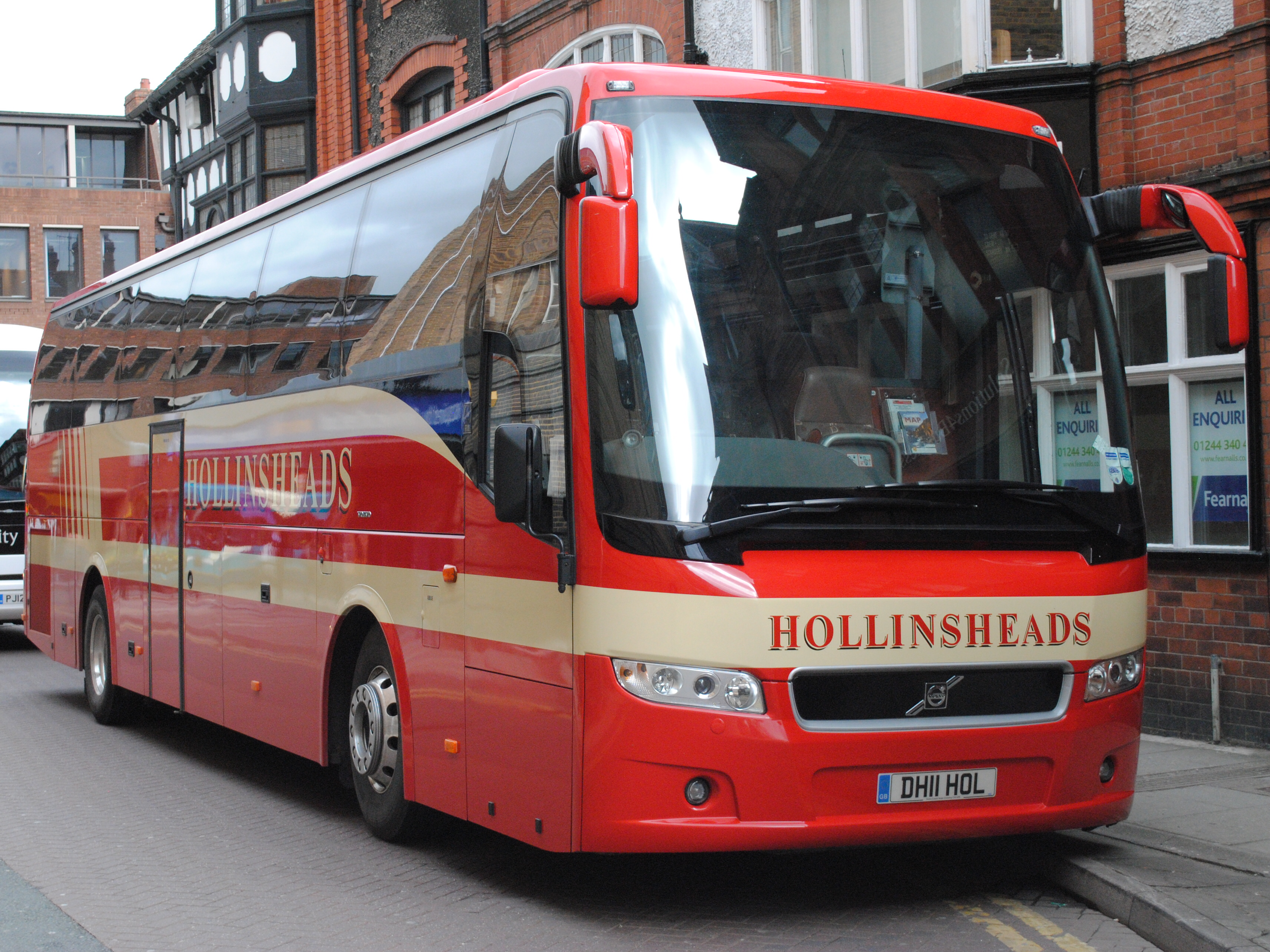
Holinsheads Volvo 9700H NG in Chester in September 2013.

The Volvo 9700 NG, also known as 9700 New/Next Generation, was revealed in the autumn of 2006. All new styling, but still the same main shape from the previous 9700 and the decades-old Carrus Star. In 2007, the 9700 NG was awarded the title Coach of the Year 2008 by European bus journalists. On 1 October 2008, Volvo closed their operations in Finland. The Tampere plant closed and the Lieto plant was sold back to Finnish investors, mostly related to Carrus, so in a way it was sold back. The new name became Carrus Delta Oy. All 9700s for the Nordic markets are still licence-built at the Lieto plant.

The B12B was still the chassis of choice from the Wrocław plant, until late 2009 when Euro V emission requirements were enforced, and all but the 340 hp engines were gone. The higher power outputs were replaced with the new B13R chassis. For the Nordic markets things changed a bit more. The B12M, which was quite popular, was no longer available. The B13R became the obvious replacement for the 9700H and 9700HD models, but the tall-standing B13R would not fit in the 9700S model, so until the introduction of the B11R in 2011, the 9700S could only be delivered with 340 hp (B12B) or 380 hp (B9R). Before 2009 420 hp was quite common with both B12B and B12M.

== Third generation, UG (2012–18) ==
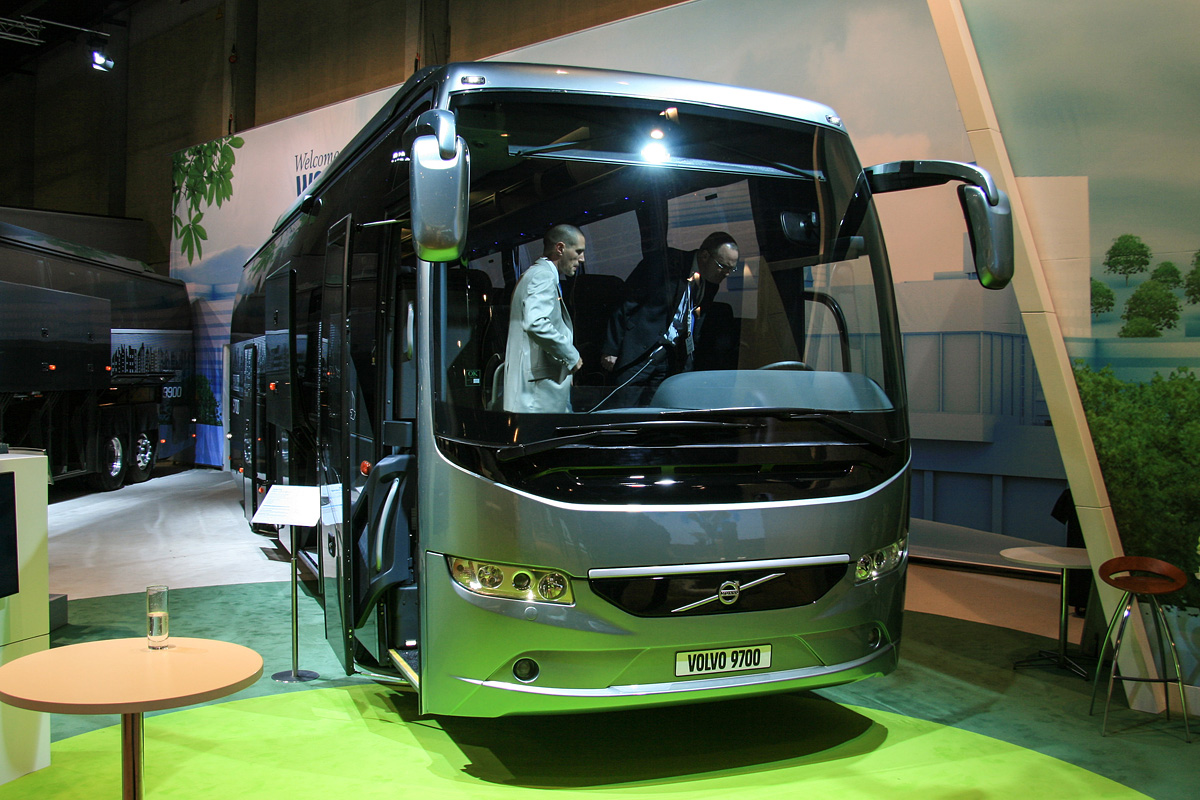
Volvo 9700H UG at Busworld Kortrijk in 2013.

The Volvo 9700 UG, also known as 9700 Upgrade, was first revealed in November 2012 for the Nordic markets, and the production at the plant in Finland was all changed to UG by early 2013. For the rest of the European markets, the new generation was postponed to the introduction of the Euro VI compliant chassis models in the autumn. The new generation got new styling details both in the front and the rear end, including new shape of the rear window and new side mirror arms. On the inside Volvo have developed all new seats, giving better side support than the previous ones. They are also a lot thinner, saving some space for legroom. While the Nordic markets got these while still on Euro V/EEV level, they got them also on B9R and B13R chassis, the rest of Europe got them only on B8R and B11R chassis.

== Fourth generation (2018–) ==
Volvo 9700H 6x2 at IAA 2018.

The fourth generation 9700 was unveiled in May 2018. It is similar to the Mexican 9800, and is built in the same European plants as the sibling, the new 9900.

A double decker version of the fourth generation 9700, the 9700DD, was launched in February 2020 and uses Volvo B11RLE chassis, a variant of B11R. It was first launched with the height of 4,25 m; a lower, 4 m-height version was launched a year later. Double decker variants are bodied at the Carrus Delta plant in Lieto, Finland.

Since mid-2022 all versions of 9700 are bodied on the relaunched B13R chassis, featuring D13K engine.

Manufacturing of the single decker 9700 bodies, once done in Volvo's now-closed plant in Wrocław, Poland, has been moved to the Spanish body builder Sunsundegui by the end of 2024.

== Alternative versions ==
=== Volvo 9700 as brucks ===
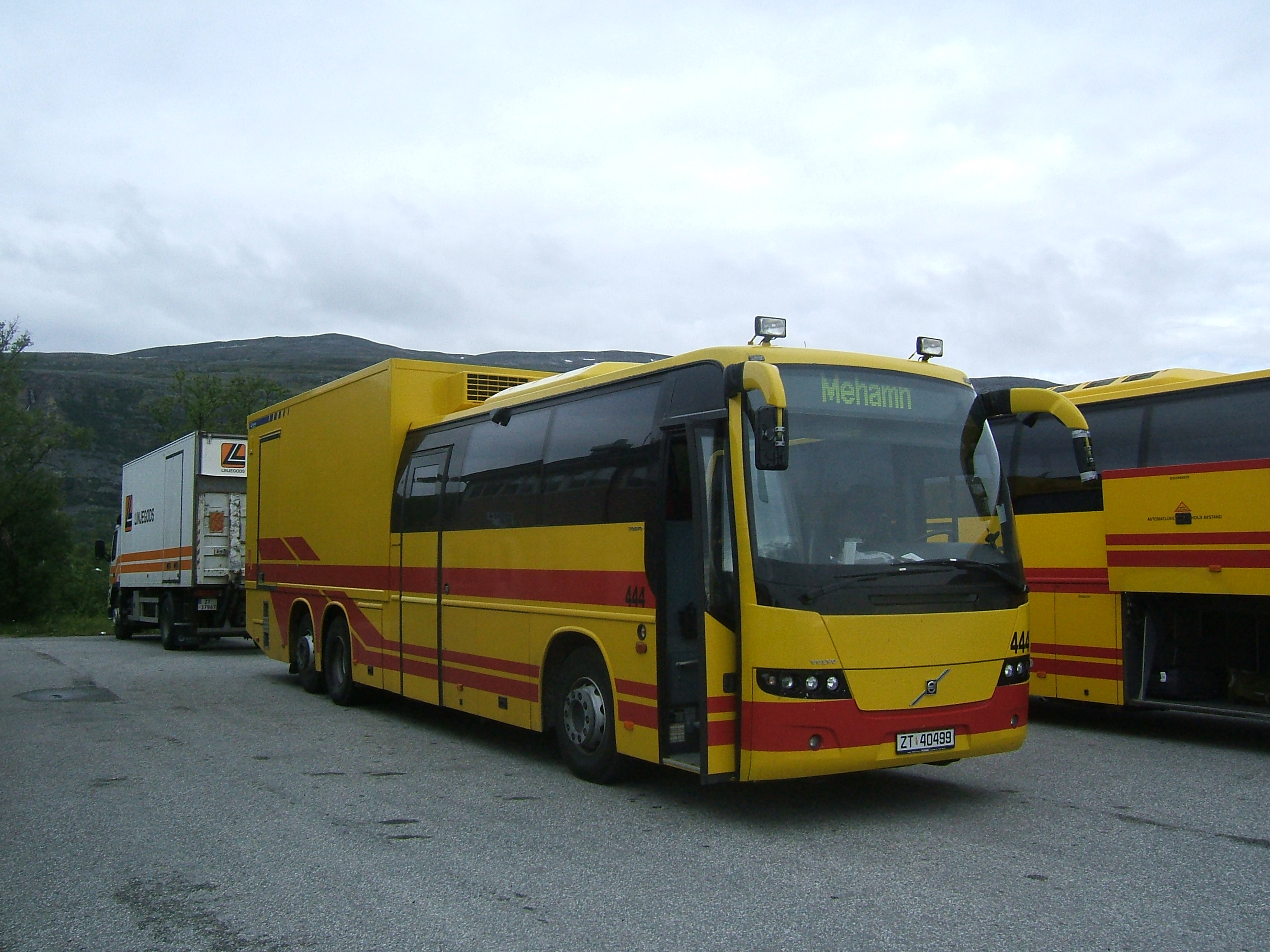
Volvo 9700S B12M 6x2 as a bruck in Finnmark, Norway.

The 9700 is also available as a bruck, with a large integrated cargo compartment at the rear end of the bus, sold only in Norway, Sweden and northern parts of Finland. The cargo compartment usually has a cargo door on the passenger side and a hydraulic cantilever tail lift. The size of the cargo compartment compared to the passenger section may vary by the customer's needs, and some are even fitted with a refrigerated section. In the old days this type of bus was offered by many coachbuilders in the Nordic countries, built on front- or mid-engined chassis, but for the last decade or so Volvo has had very little competition, except for a few double-deckers on Scania chassis, bodied by either Helmark Carosseri or Van Hool. However the brucks are not very common anymore, after the mid-engined B12M chassis was taken out of production in 2009. A rear-engine chassis makes worsened weight distribution and raised floor height at the rear, which results in less cargo capacity. Only a handful have been built on B12B and B11R since then. Also this type of route is not as common as it used to be, as it is considered cheaper to just buy a normal bus or minibus and have a separate cargo route. There are also fewer bus companies into cargo transport than there used to be a few years ago.

=== Volvo 9500 ===
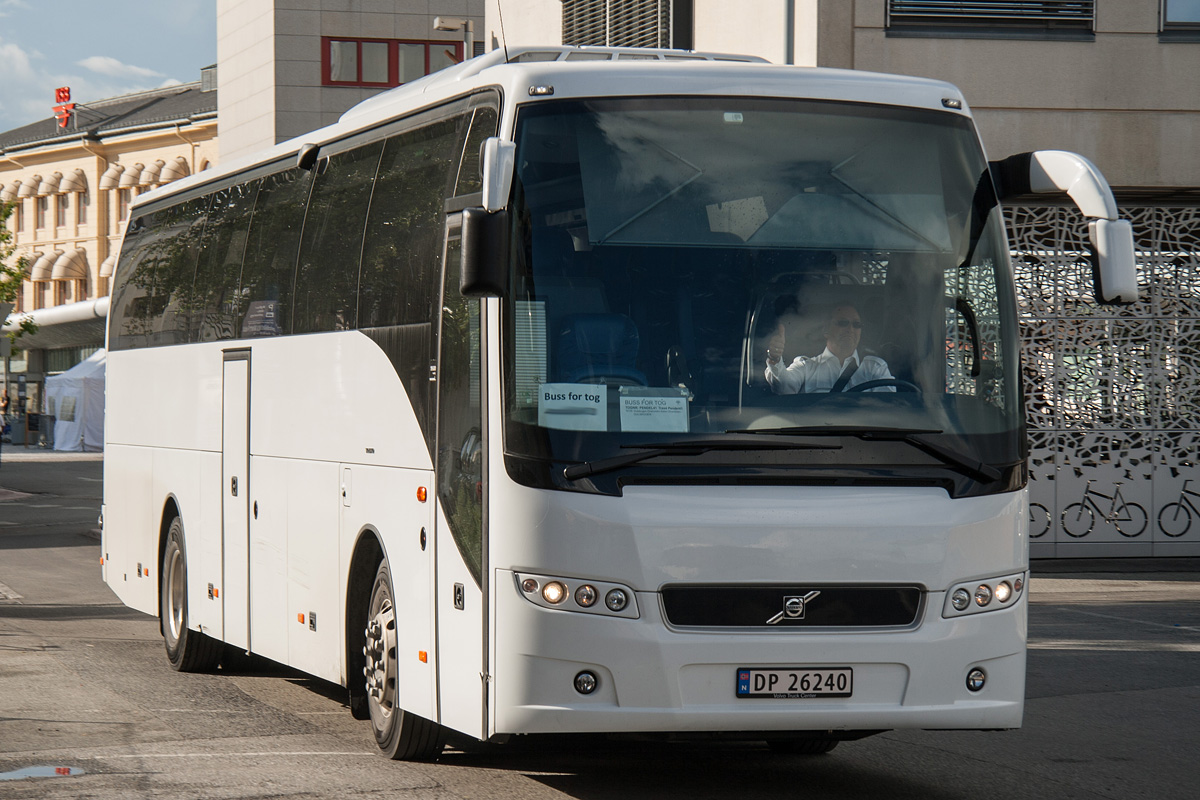
Volvo 9500 in Drammen, Norway.

The Wrocław-built Volvo 9500 was introduced as a low-price alternative at IAA Hannover in 2010, and is essentially a stripped down 9700H NG. At launch it was only available in a single 12.3-metre configuration and without the possibility for a wheelchair lift, which meant that it could not be used in route traffic in all of the EU and EEA countries. This was both to keep the price down, and to avoid it competing with the more costly 9700 models, but after a few years Volvo changed their mind and released a version with wheelchair lift too. From the start it was only built on the B9R chassis, which got replaced by the Euro VI compliant B8R chassis in 2013. To differentiate the 9500 from the other models, it has simpler-looking headlights, much like those on the Indian Volvo 9400, but in the same colour as the rest of the bus. And while the rest of the European 9700 models have been upgraded to third generation, the 9500 is still built as the second generation.

=== Volvo 9900 ===
While the first generation of Volvo 9900 introduced in 2001 had many similarities to the 9700, it was technically a separate construction and was built by Drögmöller (Volvo Busse Deutschland GmbH) in Heilbronn, Germany. When the second generation was introduced in 2007, it became a full member of the 9700 family and has since then been built in Poland.

=== Localized adaptions across the world ===
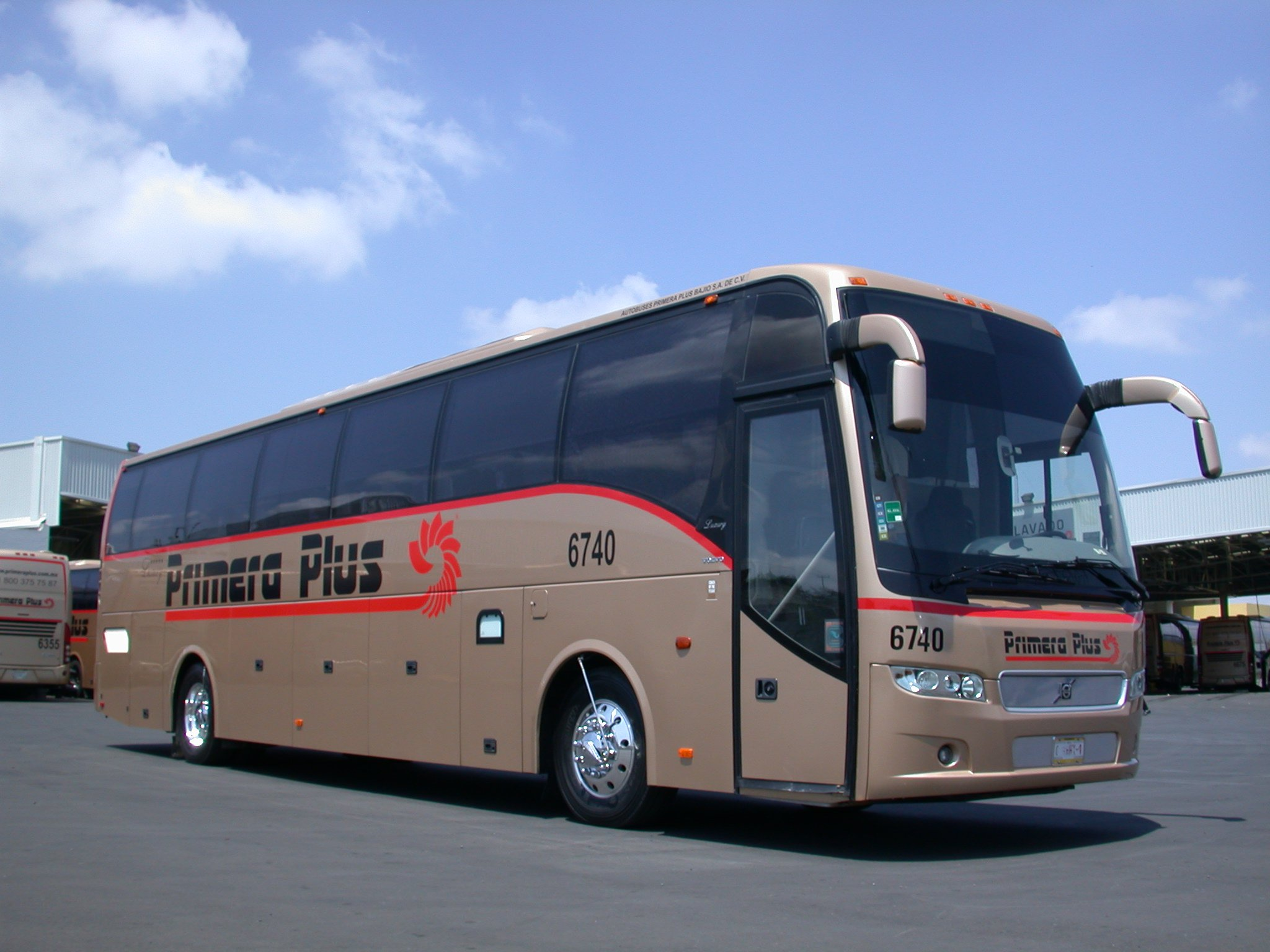
A Mexican Volvo 9700 Luxury B12B from the Primera Plus bus line.

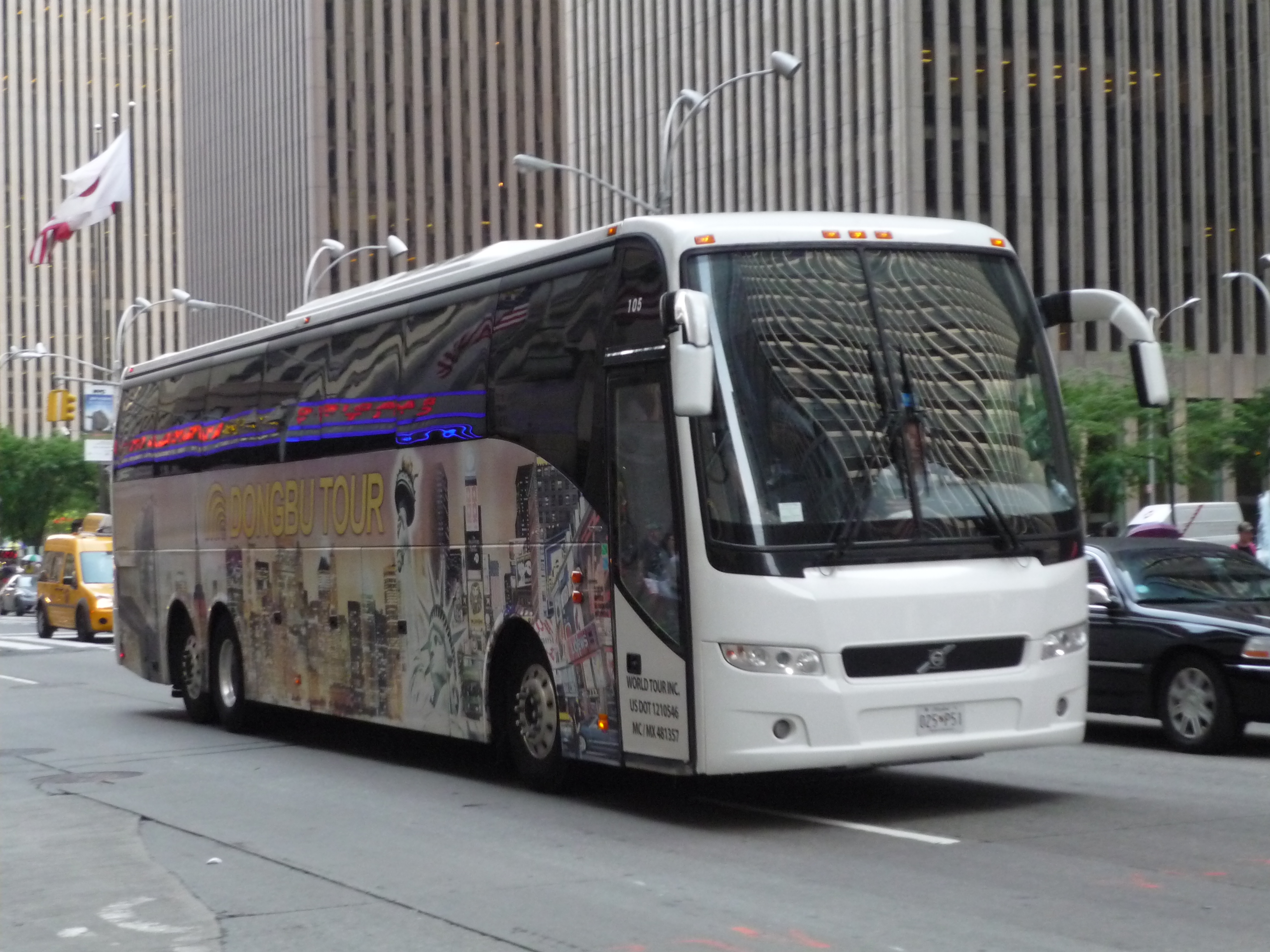
A Volvo 9700 in Manhattan

==== Mexico ====
Volvo Buses de México, S.A. in Tultitlán offered a range of 9700 models. Earlier they offered Volvo 9300 (B9R) and 9700 (B12B), resembling the 1st. generation European 9700S and 9700HD. They have also offered second generation 9700s. Currently they offer the American version known as 9700 US/CAN and the new model 9800 built on B13R chassis. Volvo's 1st Generation was known as '9700 TX', thanks to the B12B chassis (known as TX) Although second generation was built in two platforms (B12B (TX) and B13R (PX)), two variations came: Luxury and Select. A third generation was presented in 2013, known as 9700 Grand. This was specially designed for Mexico, and was sold with a B13R chassis. Luxury and Select versions were still available, but were renamed as Grand S for Select, and Grand L for Luxury. In Mexico, 9700's replacement is the new Volvo 9800.

==== USA & Canada ====
Through Volvo's Prevost subsidiary, the Volvo 9700 has been available as a 45' (13.7 m) tri-axle coach in upper North America since 2009, named the 9700 US/CAN. The model is also available in Mexico, where it is manufactured. The US/CAN differs from all other 9700 models with its two-piece split windscreen. Other differences include different engine configurations to meet American and Canadian emission standards, removing part of the driver/passenger bulkhead, and removing a fold-down seat used by replacement drivers to comply with standee line regulations in the U.S. and Canada.

Its design, based on the European-market 9700 NG, remains largely unchanged. It is built on B13R chassis, and uses Volvo D13 engine, providing 435 hp. It is a customized version of D13C engine, which is fully compliant with EPA regulations (originally 2007 regulations, later updated to 2013 and 2015 regulations). It was originally coupled exclusively with Volvo I-Shift automated transmission; an Allison fully-automatic transmission option became available since 2015 specifications update. An "Extreme Efficiency" package for Volvo I-Shift transmission also became available in 2015, and reduces horse power of the engine to 425 hp.

==== China ====
Volvo's Chinese subsidiary Xi'an Silver Bus Corporation (jointly owned with Xi'an Aircraft Industrial Corporation) offer a range of 9700-derived coaches; Volvo 9300 (B7R), Volvo 9600 (B9R) and Volvo 9800 (B12M).

==== India ====
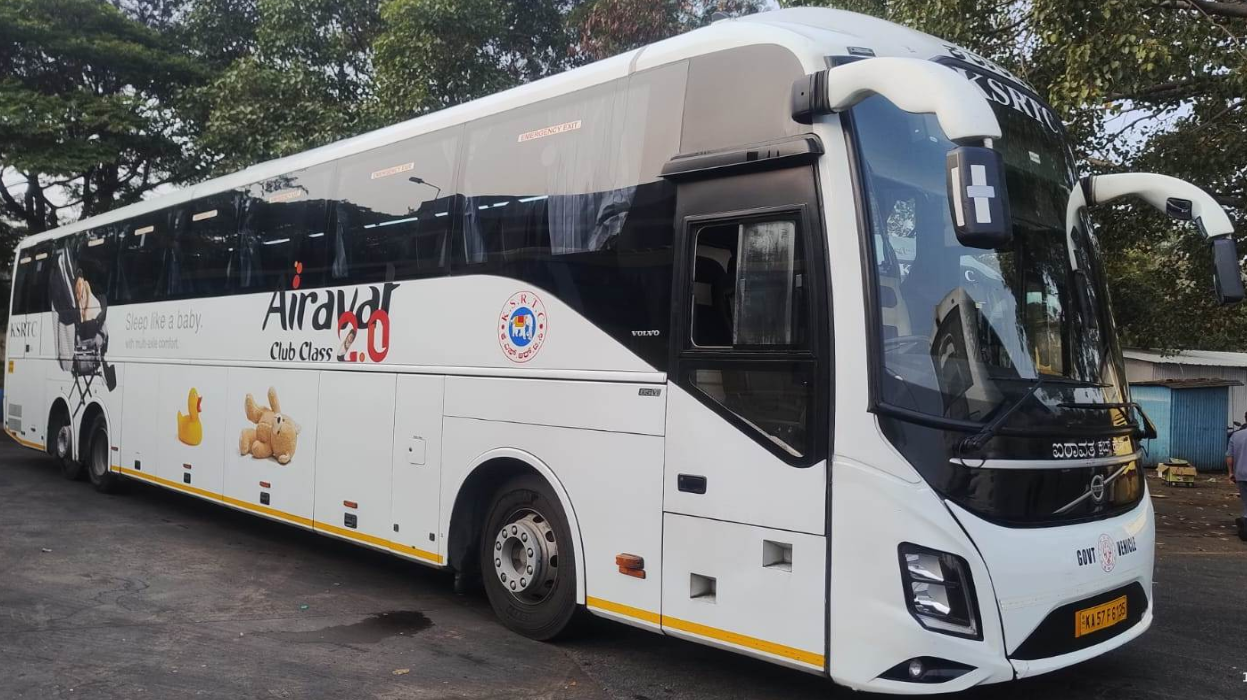
Govt RTC Airavat Club class Volvo 9600

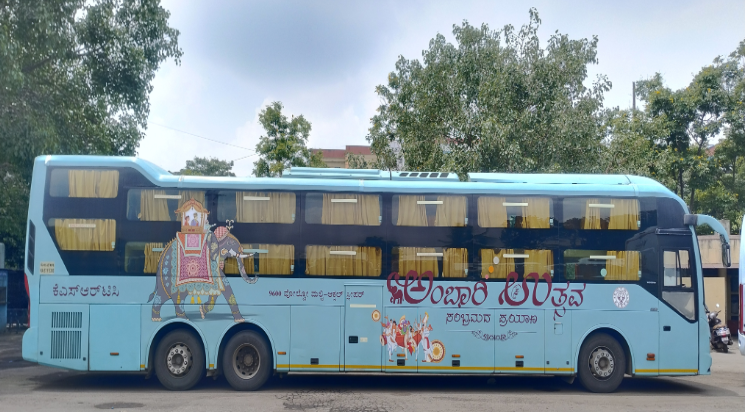
A Govt RTC Volvo 9600 Sleeper Bus from India

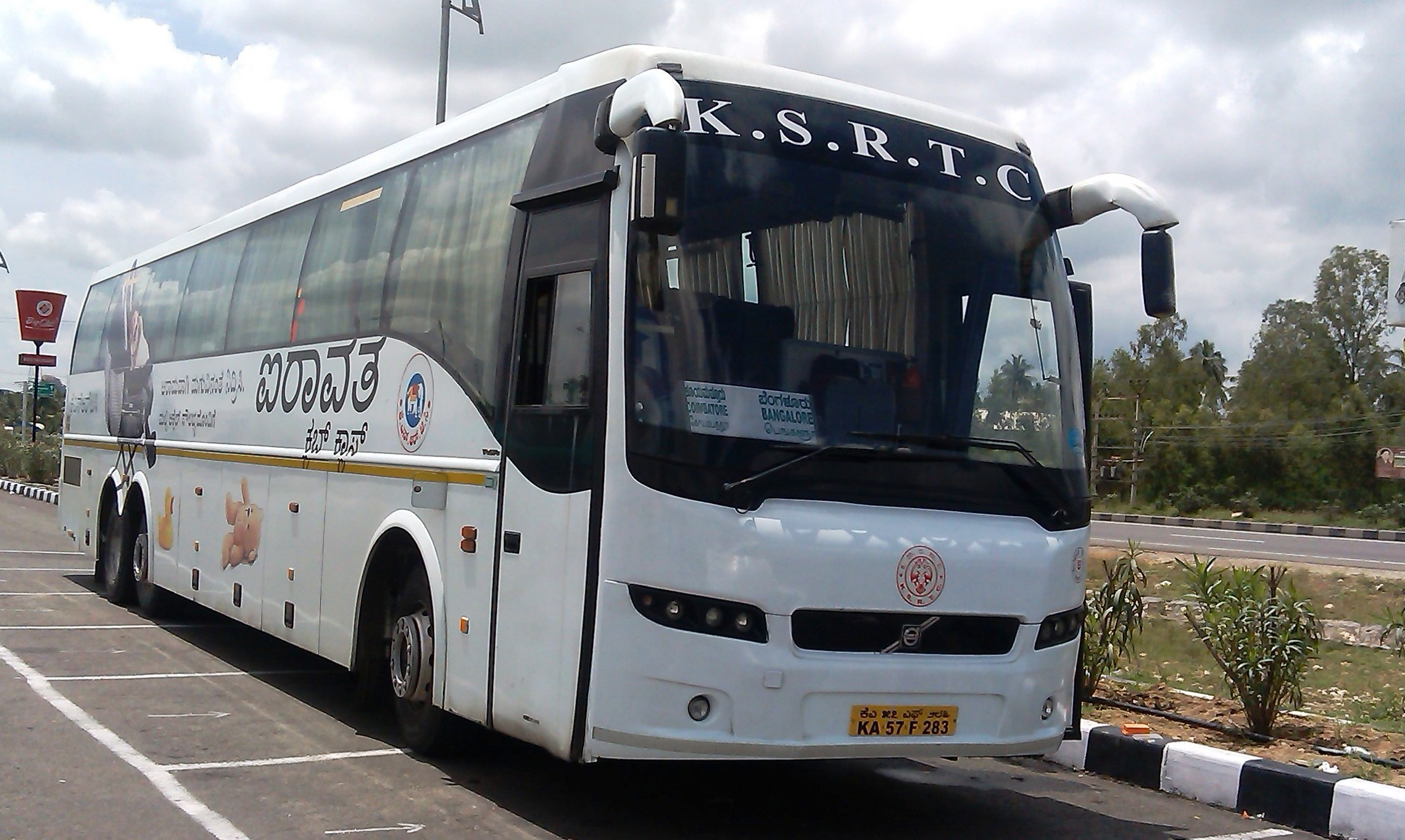
A Govt RTC Volvo 9400 from India.

Volvo Buses India Pvt Ltd started production of B7R bi-axle coaches in Hosakote, near the city of Bengaluru, in 2000. At present, they offer the Volvo 9600 range of coaches, which includes a 12.2 bi-axle seater variant, bi-axle 13.5m sleeper and seater variants, and tri-axle 15m seater and sleeper variants, all on the B8R chassis. A more premium version of the 15m sleeper variant, called the 9600 SLX, is also offered.

Previously, Volvo Buses India offered the 9400 range of coaches, which over the course of its lifespan, included a 12m bi-axle variant built on the B7R, B8R or B9R chassis, a 13.5m bi-axle variant built on the B8R chassis, a 13.7 m tri-axle 9400 variant built on the B9R 6x2 chassis, a 14.5 m tri-axle variant built on the B11R 6x2 chassis, and a 15m tri-axle sleeper variant built on the B11R 6x2 chassis. Apart from the 9400, the Volvo 9100 (built on the Volvo B7R chassis), dubbed the "Asia Bus", was also offered previously as a low-price alternative to the regular Volvo 9400 in the Indian luxury coach markets. Being the low cost alternative to the 9400, the bus lacked certain features possessed by the more premium 9400 family.
