= Plaxton Elite =

Step-entrance coach body on Volvo and Scania chassis

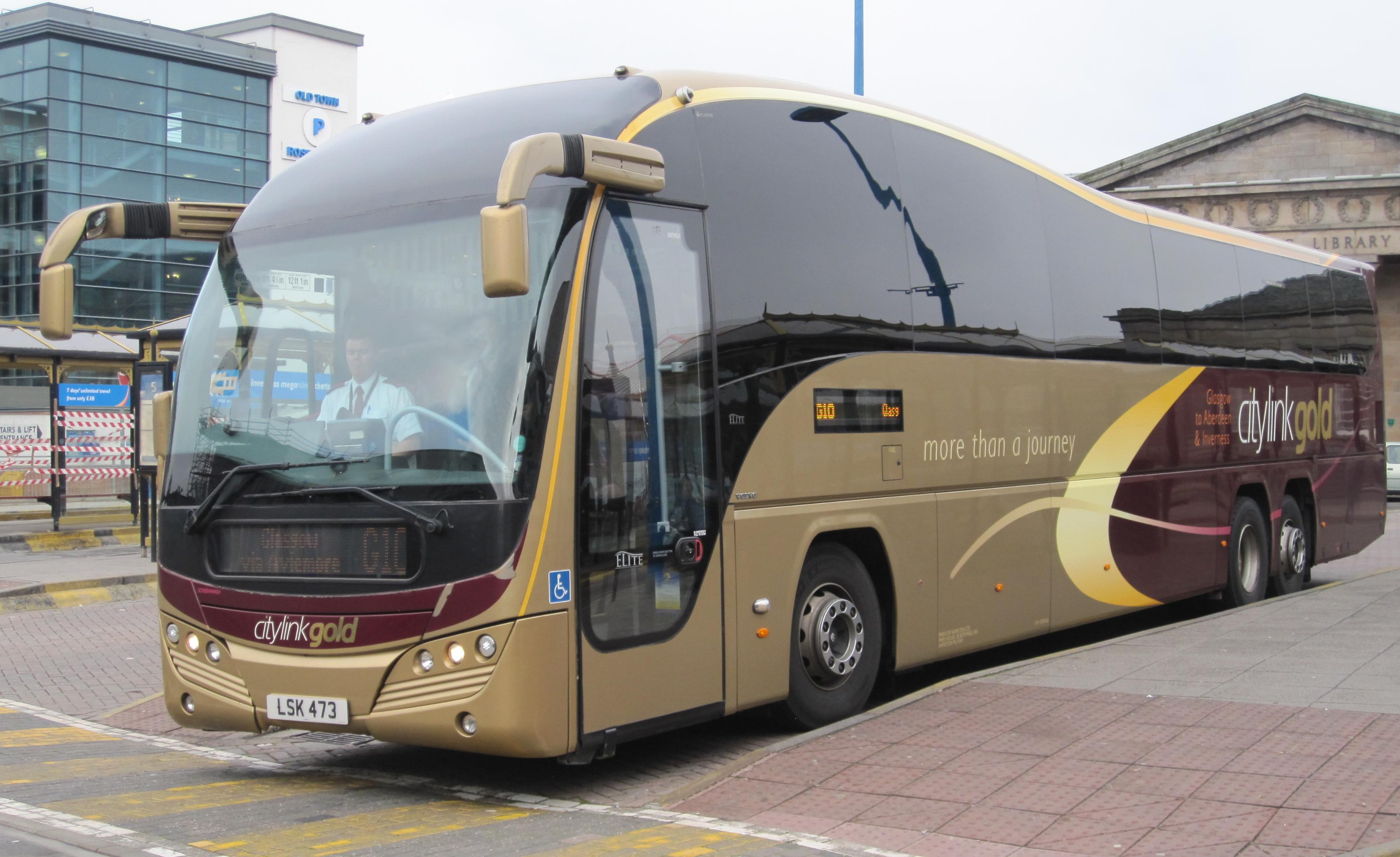
- Park's of Hamilton Plaxton Elite at Inverness bus station

Overview
- Manufacturer: Plaxton
- Production: 2008-present (Elite); 2012-present (Elite i)
- Assembly: Scarborough, North Yorkshire, England

Body and chassis
- Doors: 1 or 2 (optional continental exit)
- Floor type: Step-entrance (with optional wheelchair lift)
- Chassis: Volvo B12B; Volvo B9R; Volvo B11R; Volvo B13R; Scania K-series

Powertrain
- Engine: Volvo (B12B/BxxR); Scania (K-Series)
- Capacity: 53-70 seated

Dimensions
- Length: 12–15 metres (39–49 ft)
- Width: 2.55 metres (8 ft 4 in)
- Height: Elite; 3.7 metres (12 ft); Elite i; 3.96 metres (13.0 ft)

The Plaxton Elite is a coach body produced by the British bus and coach manufacturer Plaxton. It is primarily targeted at the premium touring market and went into production in late 2008.

== Design ==
The Elite was first unveiled at the Euro Bus Expo at the National Exhibition Centre, Birmingham in November 2008 on Volvo B12BT tri-axle chassis, the first new Plaxton product since the company was purchased by Alexander Dennis. The body uniquely features a curved roof and windscreen, making use of glass fibre panels hiding an air conditioning unit as well as glazed windows around the front entrance of the coach; Elites on scheduled express routes have a low-level destination display mounted on a panel below the windscreen, resulting in a larger front windscreen than most comparable coaches. Seating capacity for the Elite upon launch was 59 seated or 55 with an optional in-coach toilet module fitted.

=== Elite i ===
In 2012, Plaxton introduced a new "interdecker" version of the Elite named the Elite i, in which the passenger cabin extends above the driver's cab to span the full length of the vehicle; in addition there is a small lower saloon. The Elite i is 15 m long and 3.96 m high, and is built on Volvo B11RT chassis.

== Operators ==
=== Touring ===
Elites were delivered to a large number of touring and coach hire operators across the United Kingdom, including Acklams Coaches, whose luxury tours arm "Elite Travel" took its name from the coach body. The 100th Elite, built on Volvo B9R chassis, was delivered to Howard Snaith Coaches in 2011.

The first two Elite is for an independent coach operator were delivered to New Adventure Travel of Cardiff in spring 2013. Elite is were also delivered to Acklams Coaches for use primarily as sports team coaches.

Eight Elites built on 13.5 metres (44 ft) Scania K440EB chassis were exported to New Zealand for use by Ritchies Transport in 2017, uniquely featuring a HVAC air conditioning system as well as single-glazed windows, including a split windscreen, to confirm with New Zealand's vehicle weight regulations.

=== Express services ===
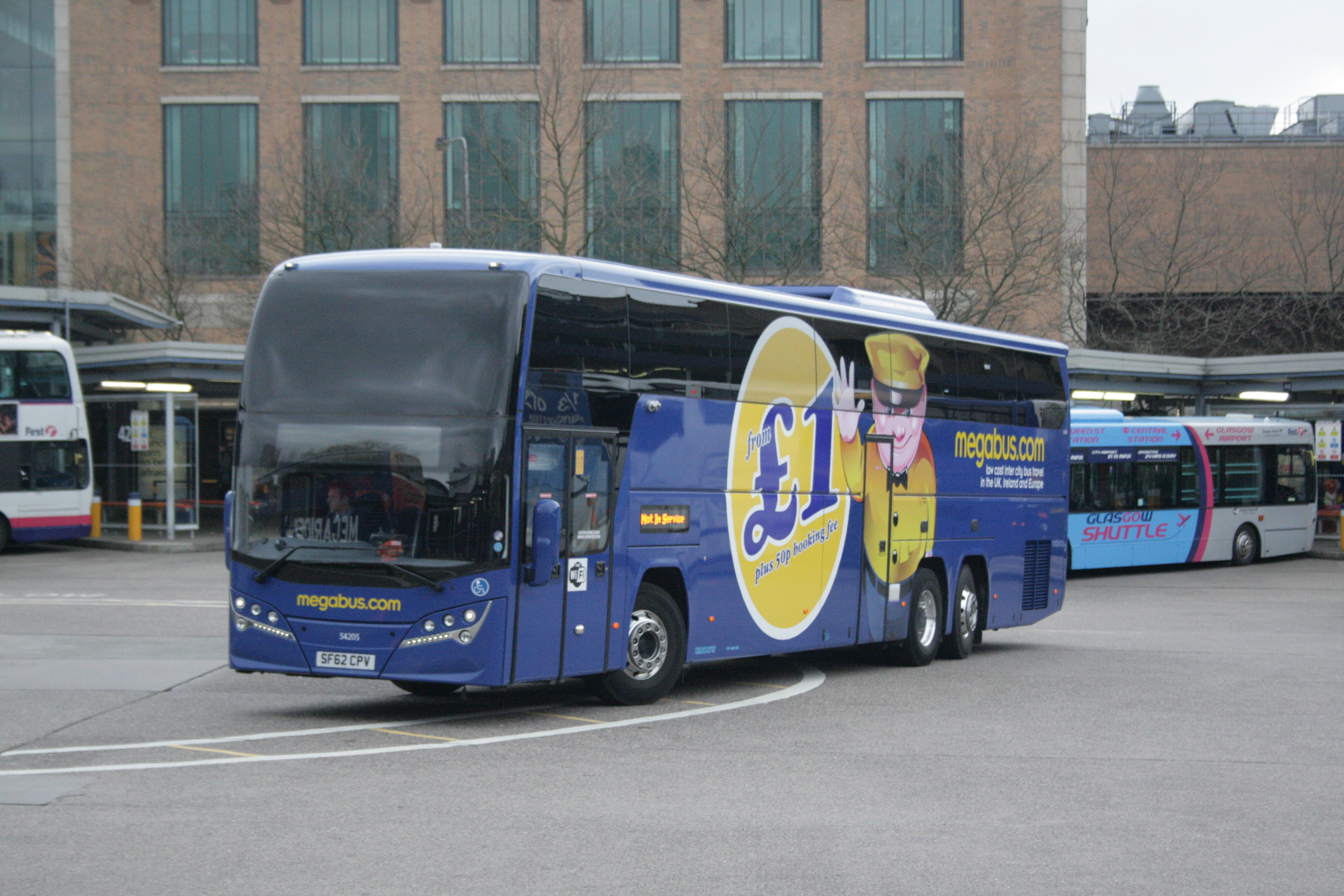
Megabus Plaxton Elite i bodied Volvo B11R at Buchanan bus station, Glasgow

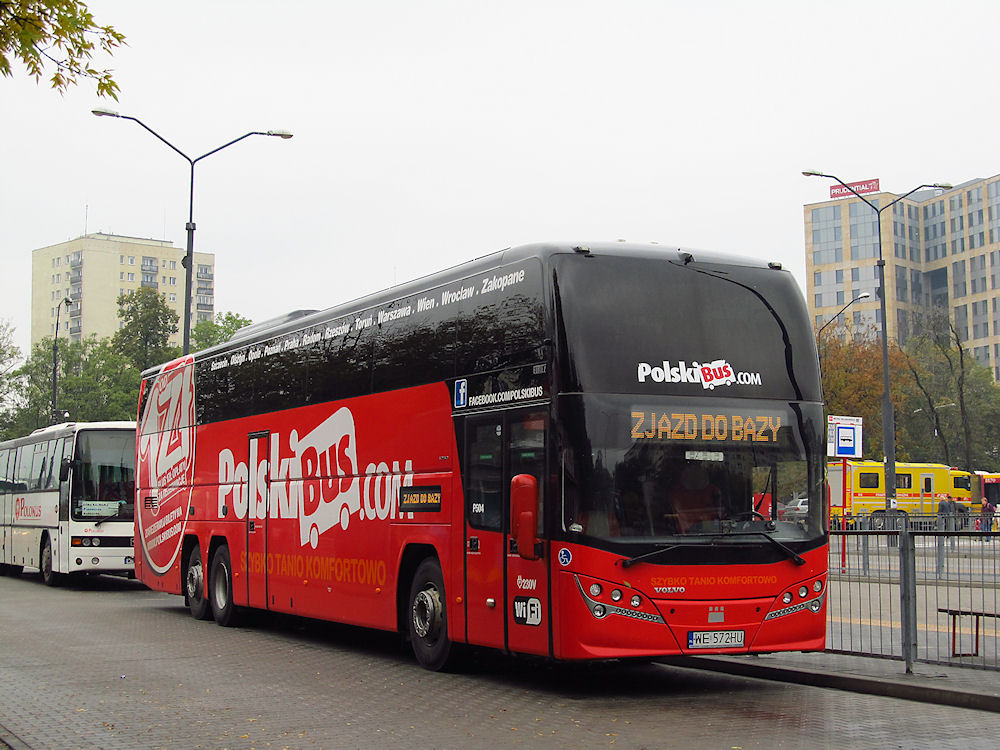
Left-hand drive PolskiBus Plaxton Elite i bodied Volvo B11R in Mokotów, Warsaw

Plaxton Elites for intercity express coach services first entered service with National Express in early 2010, with seven operating between London and Liverpool, with a further 16 vehicles later procured to operate in Yorkshire, Oxford and Peterborough. Elites delivered to Stagecoach Yorkshire for National Express work have replaced Caetano Levantes on the long-distance 560 service to London. A batch of 15-metre Elites on Volvo B13RT chassis later entered service with National Express in 2014.

Plaxton Elites are also operated on express services by some operations of the Stagecoach Group. A fleet of Elites entered service with Stagecoach West on the Oxford-Cambridge X5 service in 2015, and Stagecoach West Scotland took delivery of four Elites in October 2017 for use on the X24 service between Dunfermline and Glasgow Airport. The Elite i, meanwhile, was first commissioned by Stagecoach to be a standard vehicle operated on intercity Megabus services, with the first batch of eleven Elite is being delivered Stagecoach West Scotland for use on the network in December 2012.

Elite is on Volvo B11RT chassis were first delivered to the Oxford Bus Company in November 2013 for dual-purpose use on the company's X90 service to Victoria Coach Station as well as its Airline network connecting Oxford with London Heathrow and Gatwick Airports. These were later supplemented in early 2015 with the delivery of eight more Elite is exclusively for use on the X90.

In Plaxton's first delivery to a bus and coach operator in Poland, twenty left-hand drive Elite is on Volvo B11RT chassis were delivered to PolskiBus, owned by Brian Souter's Highland Global Transport, in August 2014 for use on an intercity network across Continental Europe based from Warsaw and Wrocław.

== Suspension of production ==
In March 2024, Alexander Dennis announced that production of all Plaxton coaches would be suspended for at least two years, owing to factory capacity being required for the Enviro EV range of buses. At that time, "[only] the Leopard and the Panther [remained] in regular production"; the most recent delivery of Elites had been a pair for Acklams of Beverley in spring 2023, amongst only 15 delivered since 2020; whilst the most recent Elite i delivery had been a pair, also for Acklams, at the beginning of 2023, these being the first examples since 2018.

== See also ==
- List of buses
