= Bruce's Coaches =

British bus operating company

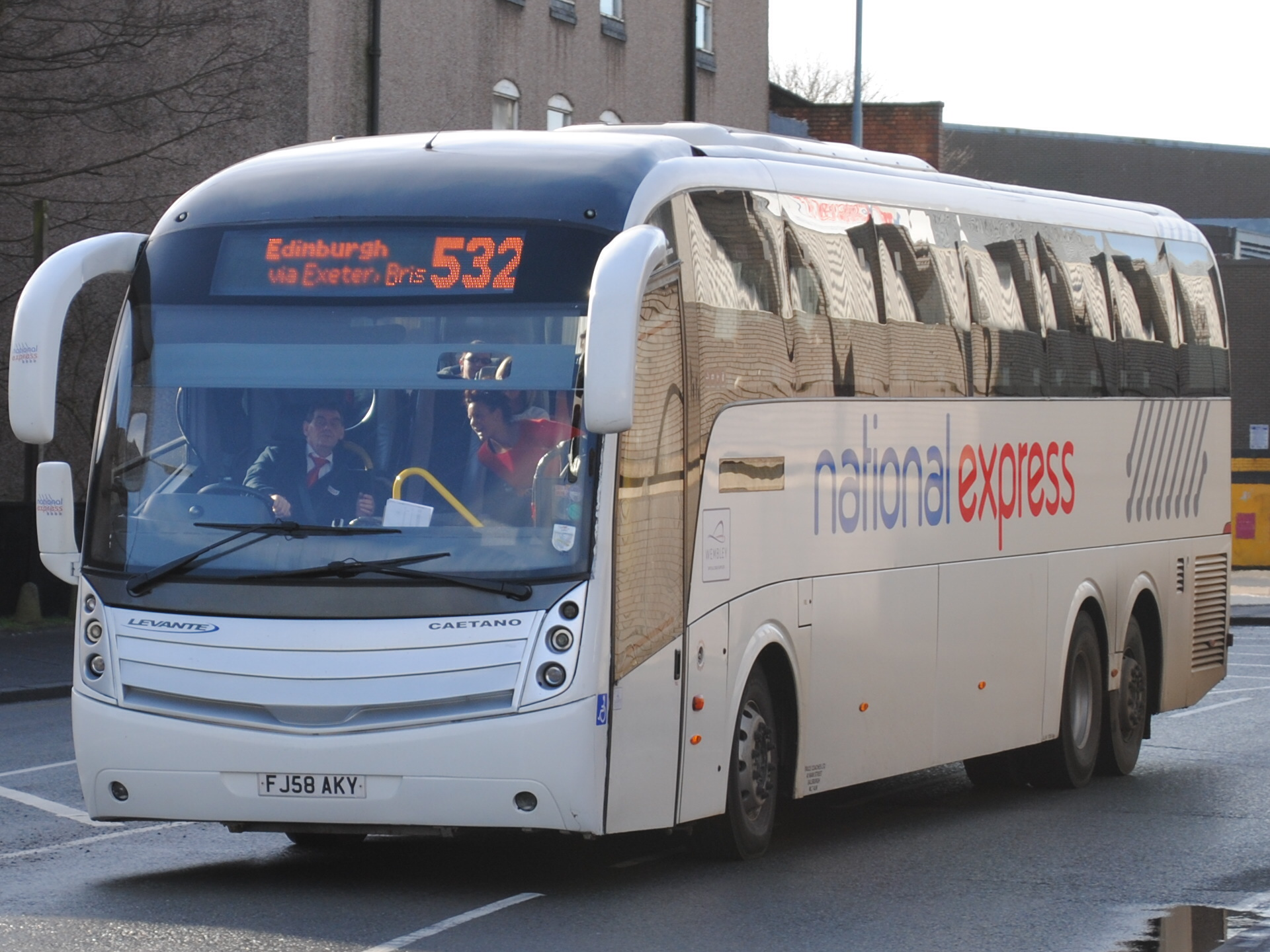
- National Express liveried Caetano Levante bodied Scania K340 at Birmingham Coach Station in February 2013
- Parent: John Bruce
- Founded: August 1982
- Headquarters: Salsburgh
- Service type: Coach operator
- Website: www.brucecoaches.com

Bruce's Coaches is a coach tour operator based in Salsburgh, Scotland.

== History ==
Bruce's Coaches was founded in August 1982 by John Bruce. After operating as a Scottish Citylink subcontractor, in 1988 a service to London commenced under the LondonLiner brand with a pair of Van Hool Alizée bodied Volvo B10Ms. LondonLiner was purchased by Scottish Citylink in 1990 with Bruce's continuing to operate the service. This lasted until 1997 when Scottish Citylink had to cease its cross border services as part of parent company National Express being awarded the ScotRail franchise.

It then became a National Express subcontractor operating route 539 from Edinburgh to Bournemouth. This work has since expanded and today it operates the five longest journeys on the National Express network:

- 588: Inverness to London
- 590: Aberdeen to London
- 920 Belfast/via Kilmarnock and Ayr Stranraer to London.

It now operates service 334 Glasgow to Bournemouth night service.

In July 2013, four coaches and the depot were destroyed in an arson attack initially thought to be related to sectarianism with a new coach for a contract with Rangers Football Club having just been delivered. Police later ruled out any sectarian motive for the arson attack.

In February 2015, Bruce's commenced operating a service from Edinburgh to Glasgow via the M8 motorway under the M8 CityXpress brand. It ceased in April 2016.

In February 2022, the firm announced that it had purchased five new coaches.
