= Volvo B11R =

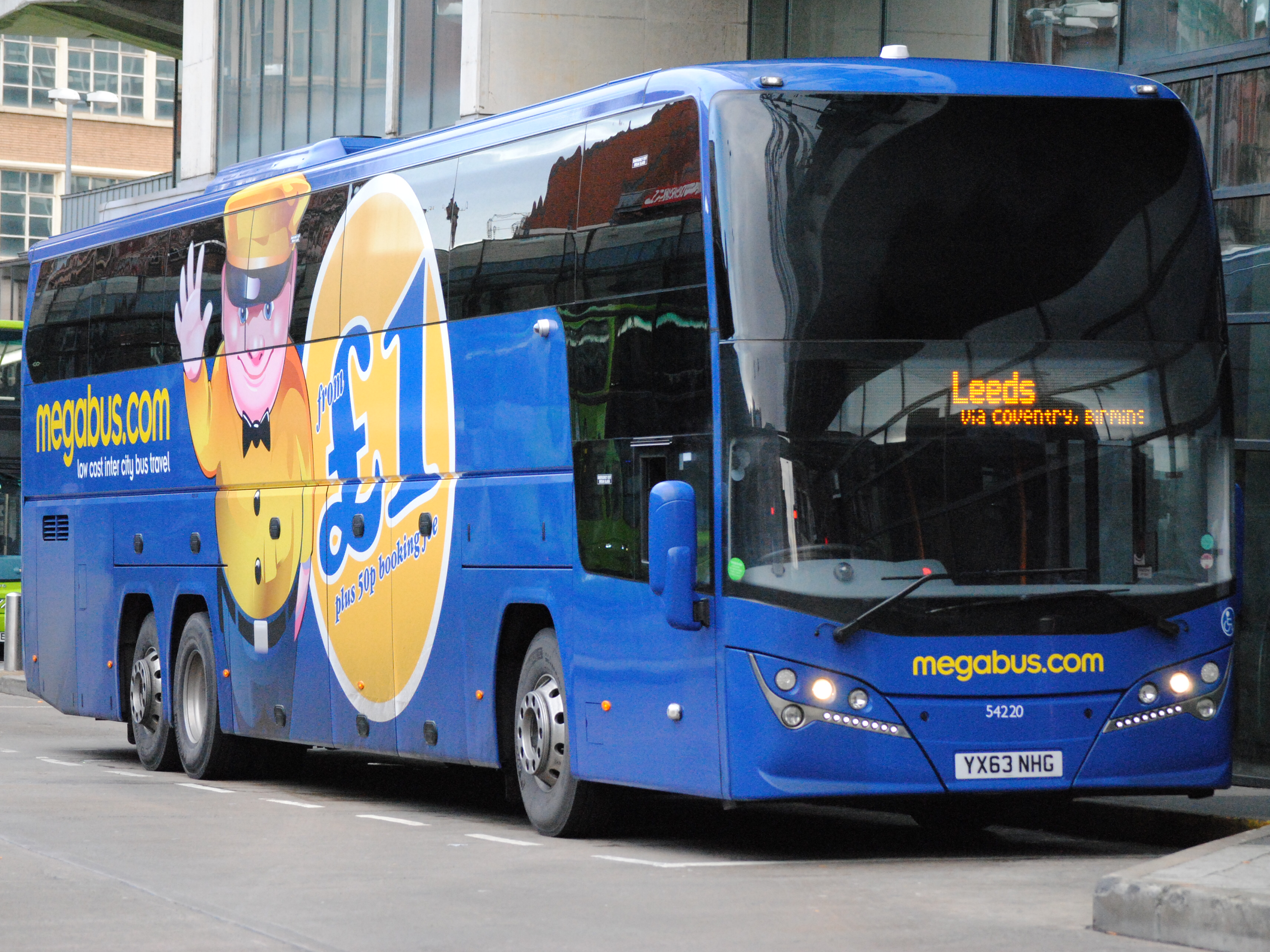
- Megabus Plaxton Elite i bodied B11R at Manchester Shudehill Interchange in September 2013

Overview
- Manufacturer: Volvo
- Production: 2011-present
- Assembly: Sweden; Brazil; India

Body and chassis
- Class: Coach chassis
- Platform: Volvo BXXR
- Floor type: Step entrance
- Related: Volvo B13R

Powertrain
- Engine: 10.8-litre rear-mounted I-6; Volvo D11C, D11K; Brazil: D11A, D11C
- Capacity: 10.8 litres
- Power output: 330-460 bhp
- Transmission: Volvo I-Shift, ZF EcoLife (for Transjakarta fleet and some B11RLET)

Dimensions
- Length: 10.5-15.0 metres

Chronology
- Predecessor: Volvo B12B; Volvo B13R; Volvo B12R (Brazil)

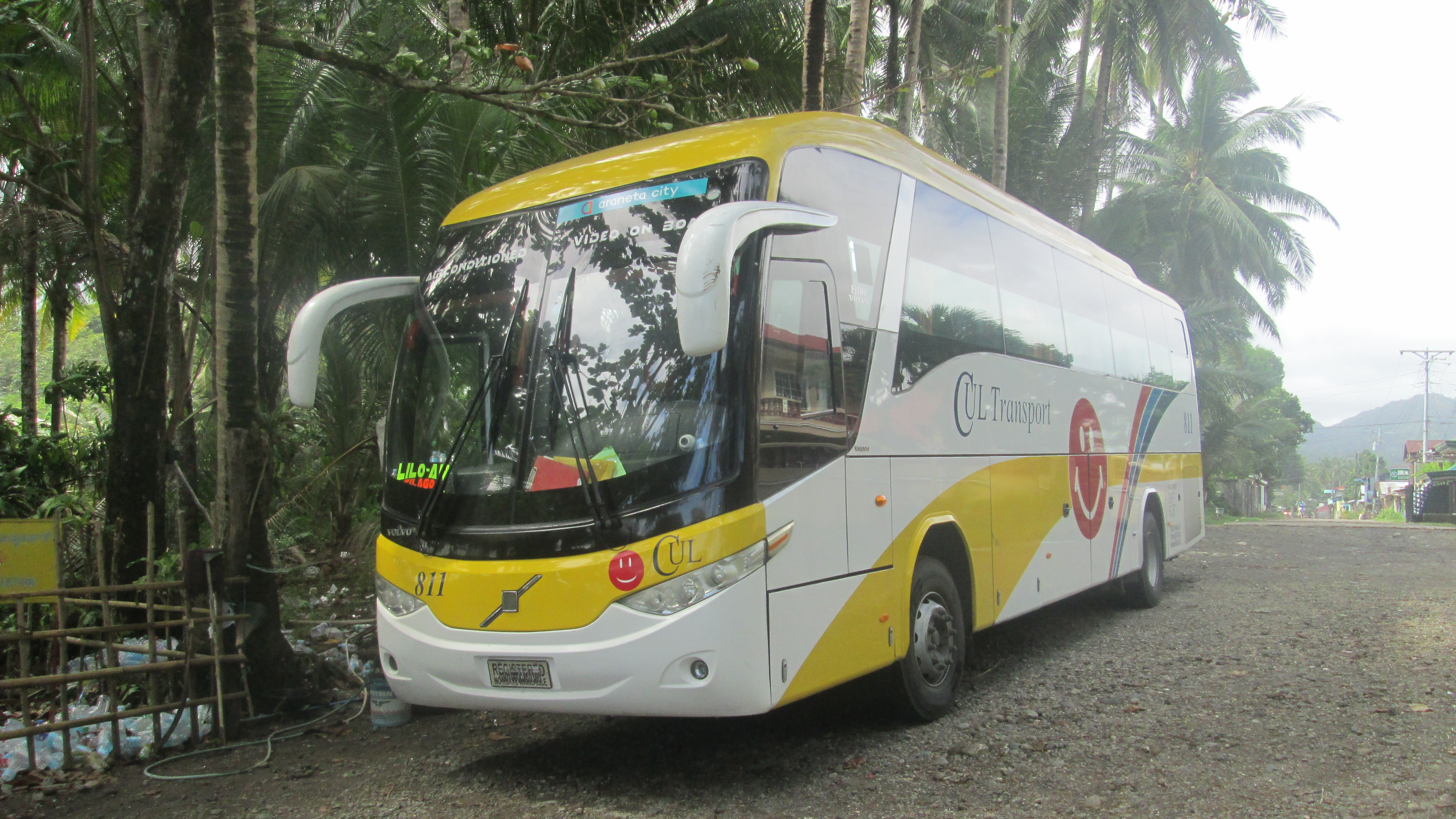
Volvo B11R operated by CUL Transport which is based in the Philippines

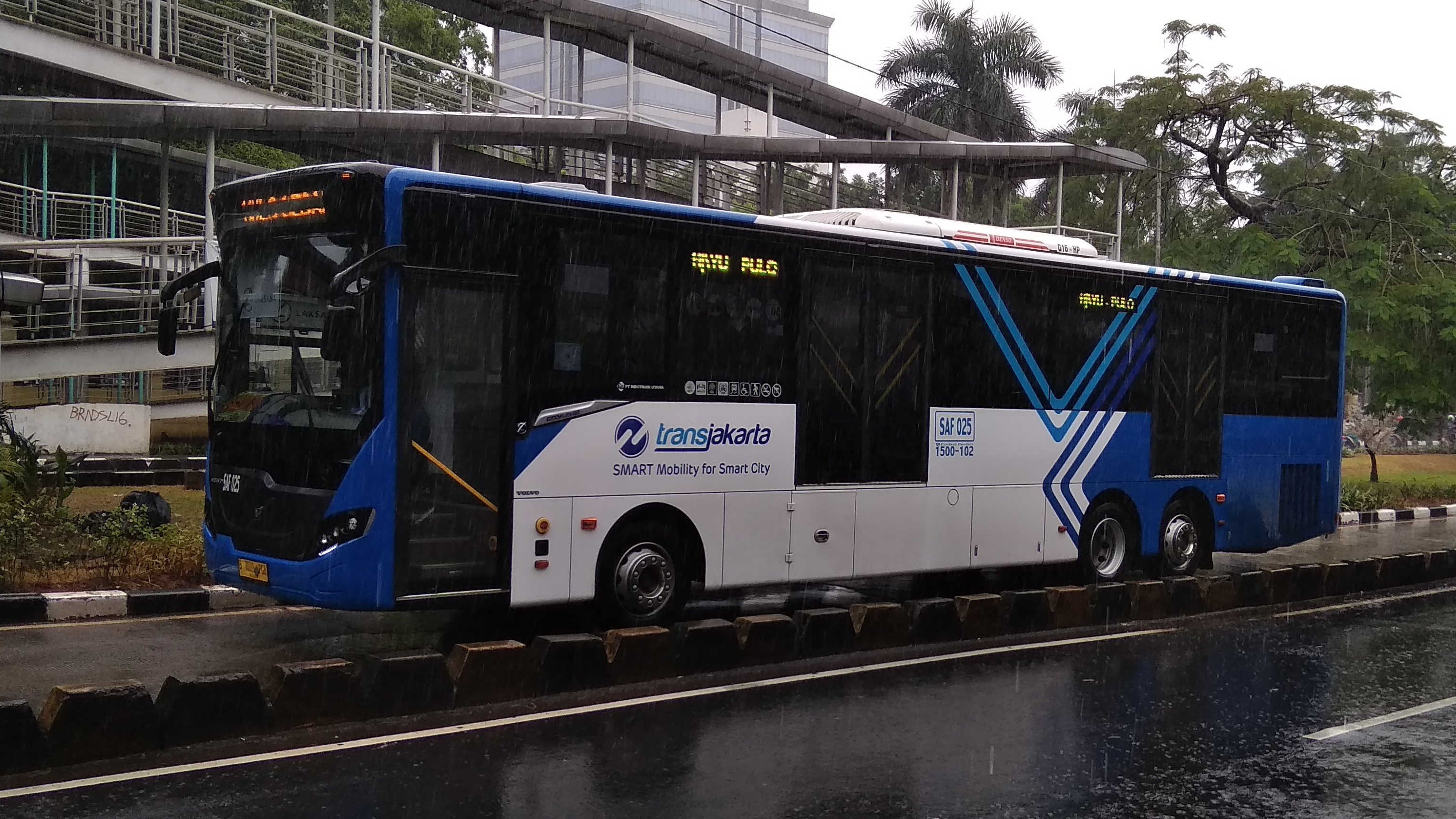
Volvo B11R operated by Steady Safe for TransJakarta (numbered SAF-025).

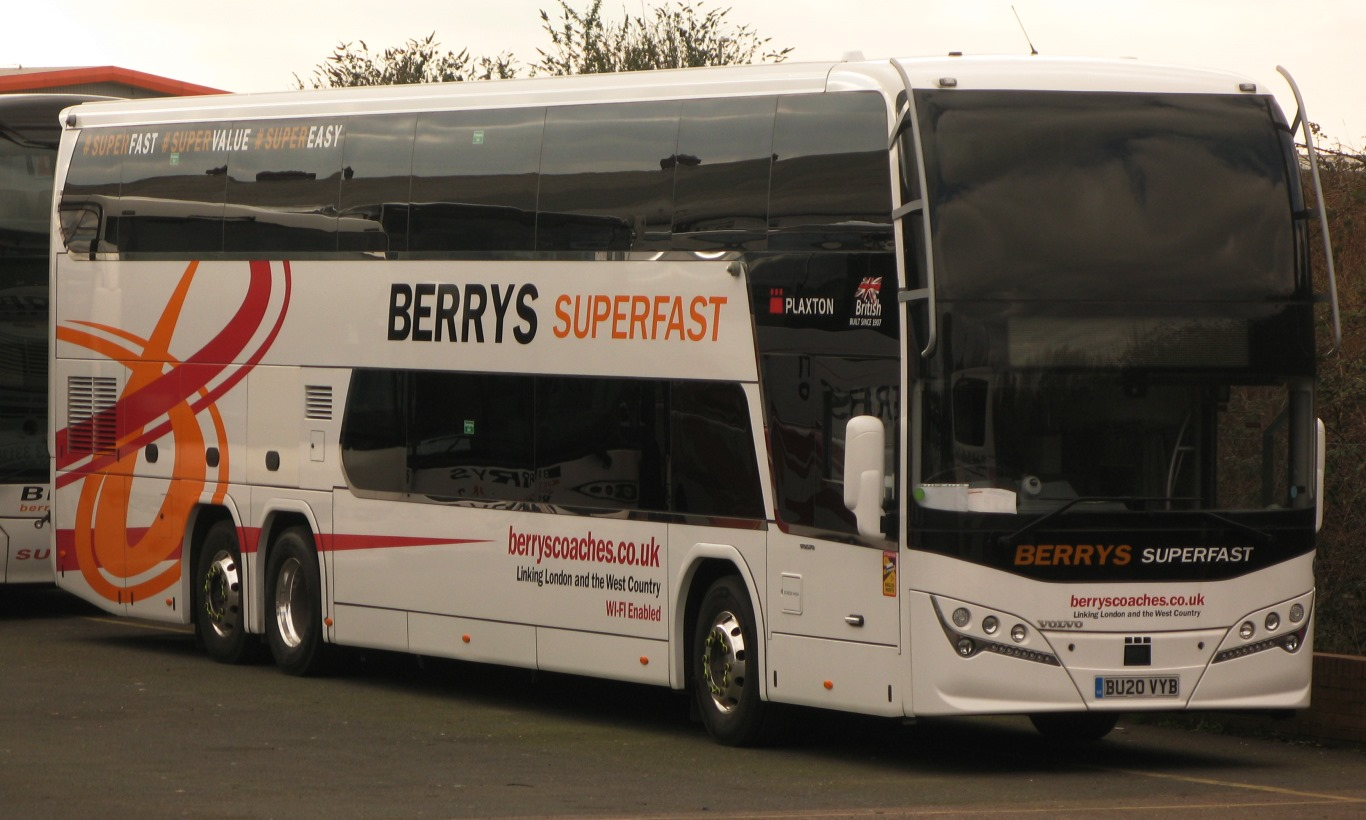
Volvo B11RLE with Plaxton Panorama body operated by Berrys Coaches in the UK

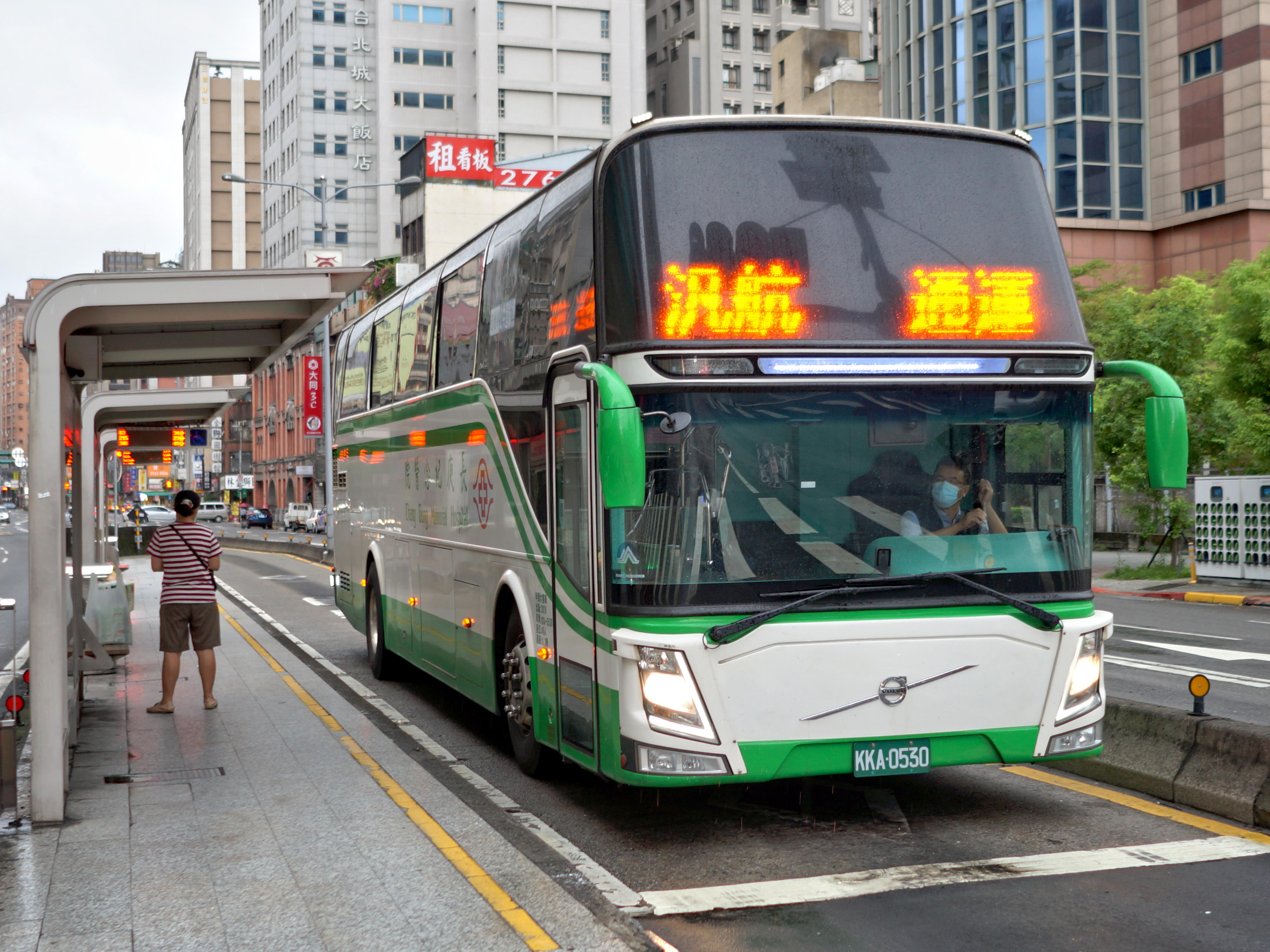
Formosa Fairway Corporation Daji bodied Volvo B11R

The Volvo B11R is a 10.8-litre engined coach chassis available as both two- and tri-axle from Volvo since 2011. It was introduced as the second of the Volvo BXXR series, replacing the rest of the B12B range in 2011, and later its fellow BXXR platform model, the B13R in 2013.

The B11R is the standard chassis for both the 9700 and 9900 coaches, except the North American 9700 which still use the B13R. It is also available in the Indian market and is sold by Volvo under the 9400 brand with a length of 14.5 metres and has bodywork similar in design to pre-2018 European Volvo 9700/9900.

A version for double-decker coaches, known as B11RLE, is also produced. It was first introduced in June 2018 with Plaxton Panorama bodywork for UK and Irish markets, and was later expanded to mainland Europe in February 2020 with launch of Volvo 9700DD, a double-decker version of Volvo 9700.

As at October 2014, over 150 had been sold in the United Kingdom and Ireland. Polish operator PolskiBus purchased 20 with Plaxton Elite i bodies, while New Zealand operator ManaBus has purchased a fleet of Kiwi Bus Builders bodied B11Rs.

In the Philippines, B11R is being introduced by Autodelta Coach Builders, Inc., which is the sole distributor of Volvo Buses in the country. They offer 370 HP and 450 HP variants, both of them are Euro V compliant. Victory Liner, CUL Transport, and Silver Star Shuttle and Tours are the companies currently operating Volvo B11Rs for provincial routes.

In Indonesia, Volvo B11R comes in 2 engine variants, 370 bhp and 430 bhp fulfilling Euro III emission standards. PT. Steady Safe Tbk operates more than 100 Laksana Cityline 2 bodied 370 bhp variant B11Rs for TransJakarta using ZF EcoLife transmission. A number of private bus companies uses the 430 bhp variant with I-Shift transmission as intercity and charter buses.

== Quad-axle Brazilian Variants ==
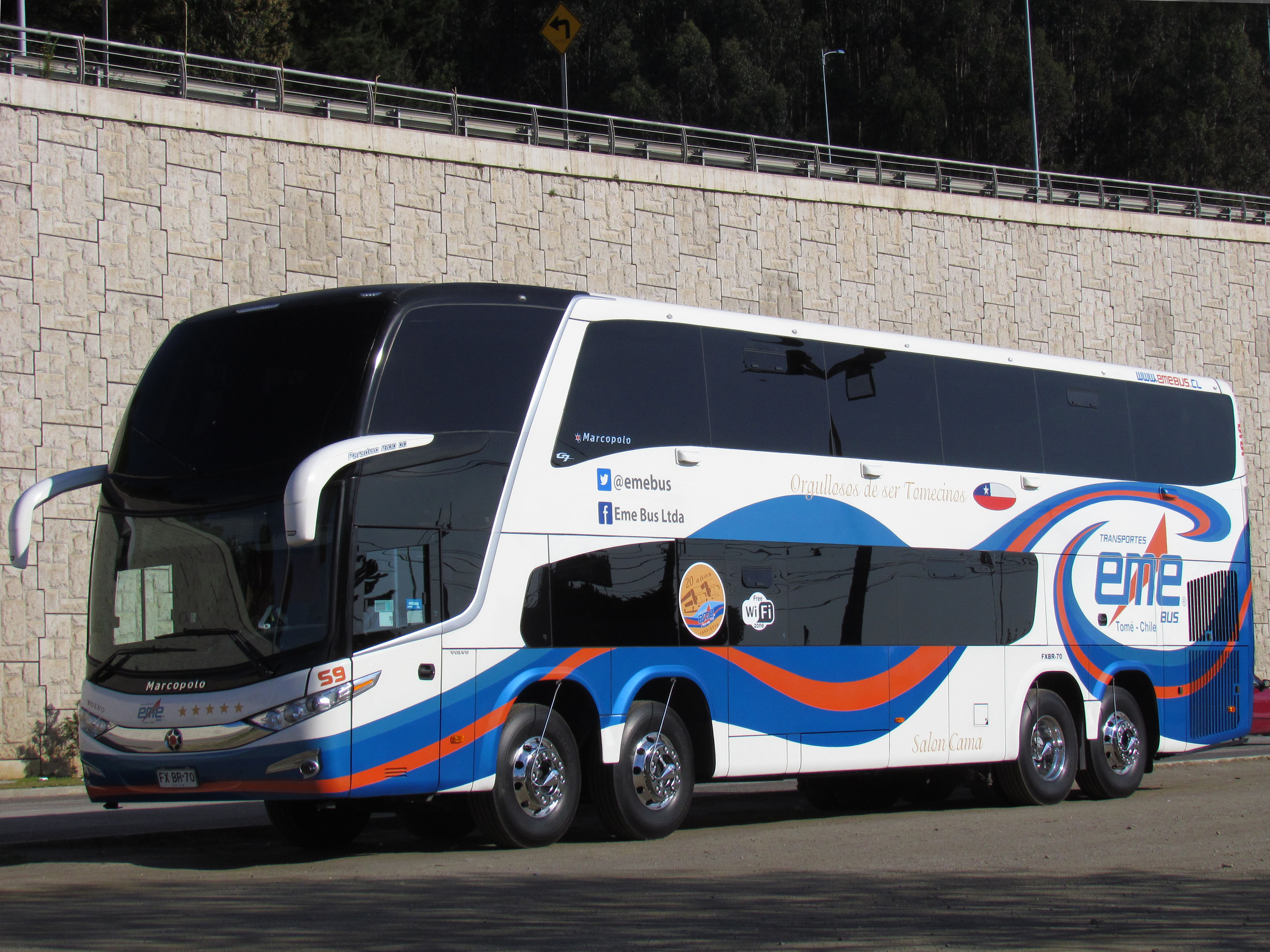
Eme Bus Marcopolo Paradiso G7 1800 DD-bodied B430R 8x2 in Chile

The B11R is also available from the plant in Curitiba, Brazil, but there it is named after the engine output, with the B380R/B430R range for Euro III and B340R/B380R/B420R/B450R for Euro V. Those with an engine output of 330, 370 and 410 bhp have got their names adjusted to what the previous values were for the preceding B12R range that they replaced. Like its predecessor, the B12R, it is also available in a quad-axle version for large double-deckers.

== Engines ==
D11A, 10 837 cc, in-line 6 cyl. turbodiesel (2011-?) Only available from Brazil.

- D11A370 - 273 kW (370 bhp), 1770 Nm, Euro III
- D11A430 - 317 kW (430 bhp), 1970 Nm, Euro III

D11C, 10 837 cc, in-line 6 cyl. turbodiesel (2011–present) Only available from Brazil since 2014.

- D11C330 - 243 kW (330 bhp), 1600 Nm, Euro V
- D11C370 - 272 kW (370 bhp), 1750 Nm, Euro V
- D11C410 - 302 kW (410 bhp), 1950 Nm, Euro V/EEV
- D11C450 - 332 kW (450 bhp), 2150 Nm, Euro V

D11K, 10 837 cc, in-line 6 cyl. turbodiesel (2013–present)

- D11K380 - 280 kW (380 bhp), 1800 Nm, Euro VI
- D11K430 - 316 kW (430 bhp), 2050 Nm, Euro VI
- D11K460 - 339 kW (460 bhp), 2200 Nm, Euro VI
