= Volvo B13R =

12.8-litre engined coach chassis available as both two- and tri-axle from Volvo

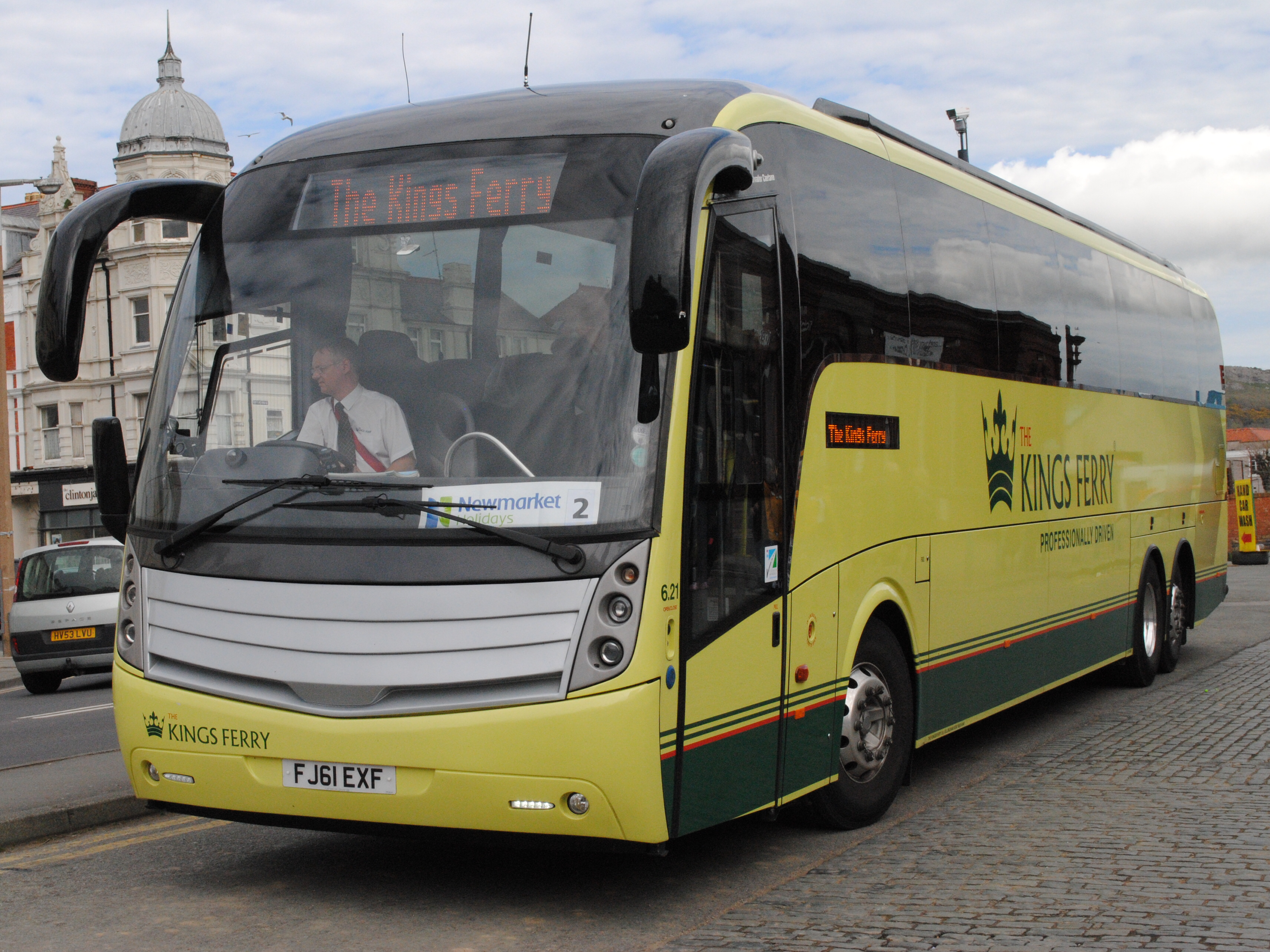
- The Kings Ferry Caetano Levante bodied B13R in Llandudno in May 2013

Overview
- Manufacturer: Volvo
- Production: 2009-present
- Assembly: Sweden; Mexico

Body and chassis
- Class: Coach chassis
- Platform: Volvo BXXR
- Floor type: Step entrance
- Related: Volvo B11R

Powertrain
- Engine: Volvo D13C/D13K
- Power output: 420-500 bhp (plus 380 bhp for D13K)
- Transmission: Volvo I-Shift

Dimensions
- Length: 10.5-15.0 metres

Chronology
- Predecessor: Volvo B12B
- Successor: Volvo B11R

Volvo B13R is a 12.8-litre engined coach chassis available as both two- and tri-axle from Volvo since 2009. It was the first of the Volvo BXXR series, replacing the higher output configurations of the B12B. It was later joined by the B11R, which has the same base chassis but a smaller engine. However, because Volvo decided not to upgrade the D13 engine to comply with the Euro 6 emission requirements, it was replaced by the B11R in the European market, but is still available at other markets, like Mexico. The B13R is easy recognisable as being the only modern Volvo coach chassis with air intakes on the right-hand side.

After launch in 2009 it soon became the default choice of chassis for Volvo's 9700 and 9900 coaches, as only the 340 hp configuration of the B12B was compatible with the Euro V requirements. The lowest configuration of the 9700; the 9700S, was not compatible with the B13R, as the engine was so tall that it would conflict with the internal floor.

Over 190 were sold in the United Kingdom, with Park's of Hamilton purchasing 32. Australian interstate operator Greyhound Australia purchased 30. The tri-axle version of the B13R is known in the UK as the B13RT.

Volvo later reintroduced the B13R chassis, on 30 June 2022, featuring Euro VI-compliant D13K engines. It is also part of the refreshed fourth-generation Volvo 9700 and 9900 coaches in European markets (replacing B11R) and Volvo 9800 coach in Mexico (replacing previous B13R model) and, like their predecessors, is also available in "LE" configurations for double-decker coaches.

== Engines ==
D13C, 12 777 cc, in-line 6 cyl. turbodiesel (2009-present)

- D13C420 - 309 kW (420 bhp), 2100 Nm, Euro V/EEV
- D13C460 - 338 kW (460 bhp), 2300 Nm, Euro V/EEV
- D13C500 - 368 kW (500 bhp), 2500 Nm, Euro V

The D13C500 is only available on certain markets. One example is the Comil Campione DD-based Volvo Double Decker available in Mexico.

D13K,

- D13K380 - 280 kW (380 bhp), 1800 Nm, Euro VI
- D13K420 - 310 kW (420 bhp), 2100 Nm, Euro VI
- D13K460 - 340 kW (460 bhp), 2300 Nm, Euro VI
- D13K500 - 370 kW (500 bhp), 2500 Nm, Euro VI
