= Volvo B12B =

Rear engined Chassis manufactured by Volvo for Coaches

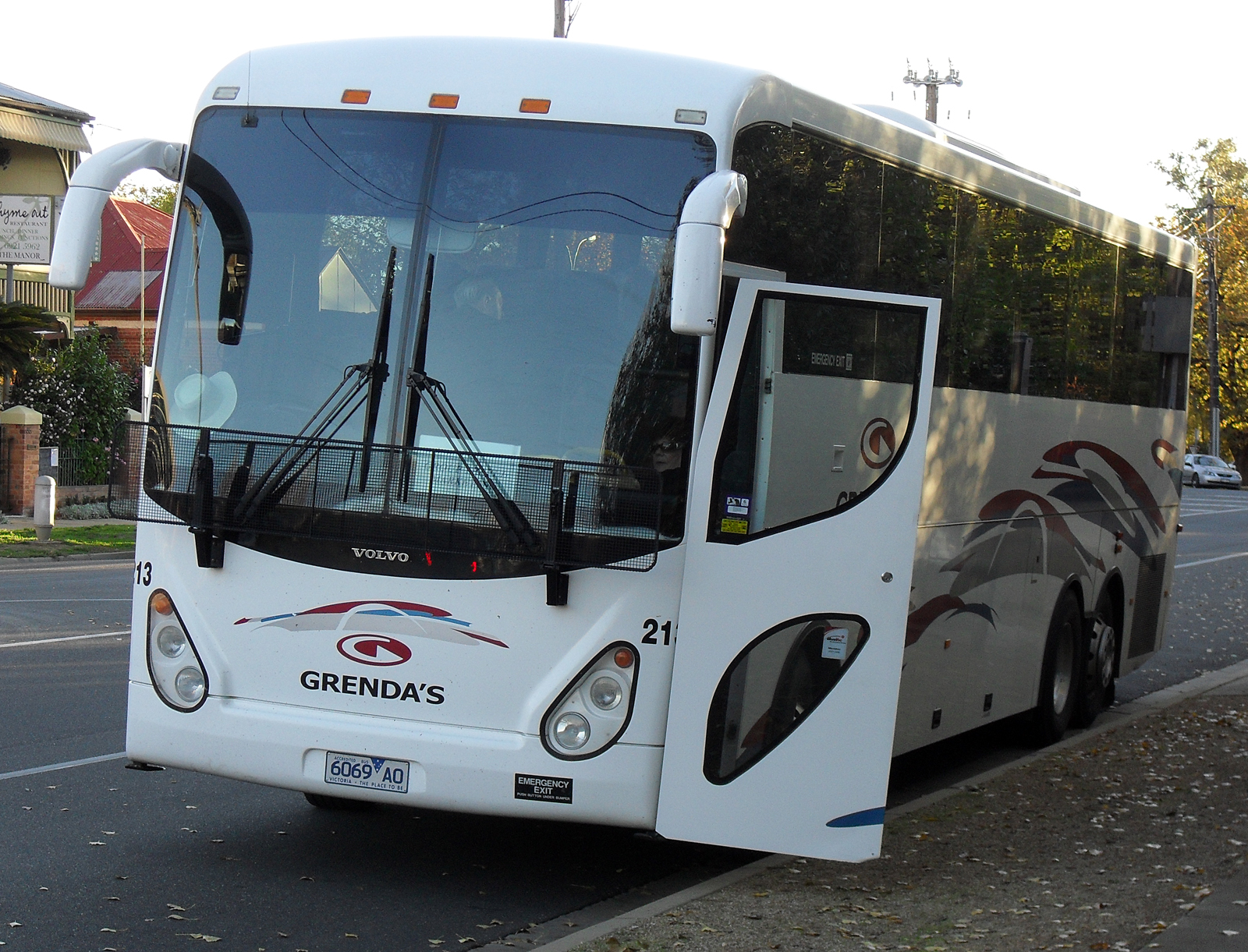
- Grenda's Bus Service Volgren bodied Volvo B12B

Overview
- Manufacturer: Volvo
- Production: 2001-2009
- Assembly: Sweden, China

Body and chassis
- Floor type: Step entrance

Powertrain
- Engine: Volvo DH12 6-cylinder turbo diesel
- Capacity: 51-100 seated

Dimensions
- Length: 12–15 metres (39 ft 4 in – 49 ft 3 in)
- Width: 2.55 metres (8 ft 4 in)
- Height: 3.45–4.4 metres (11 ft 4 in – 14 ft 5 in)

Chronology
- Predecessor: Volvo B12; Volvo B10B
- Successor: Volvo B13R

The Volvo B12B was a rear-engined coach and intercity bus chassis built by Volvo. It is built as a direct replacement of Volvo B12 in the European market and the Volvo B10B.

The B12B could be fitted with Volvo DH12C (later DH12D and DH12E) 6-cylinder 12-litre engine, coupled to a Volvo-automated, ZF automatic, or later, Volvo I-Shift transmission.

Volvo also developed a low-entry variant of B12B, known as the Volvo B12BLE, for intercity and city operations.

The Volvo B12B has been superseded by the Volvo B13R with a 13-litre engine.

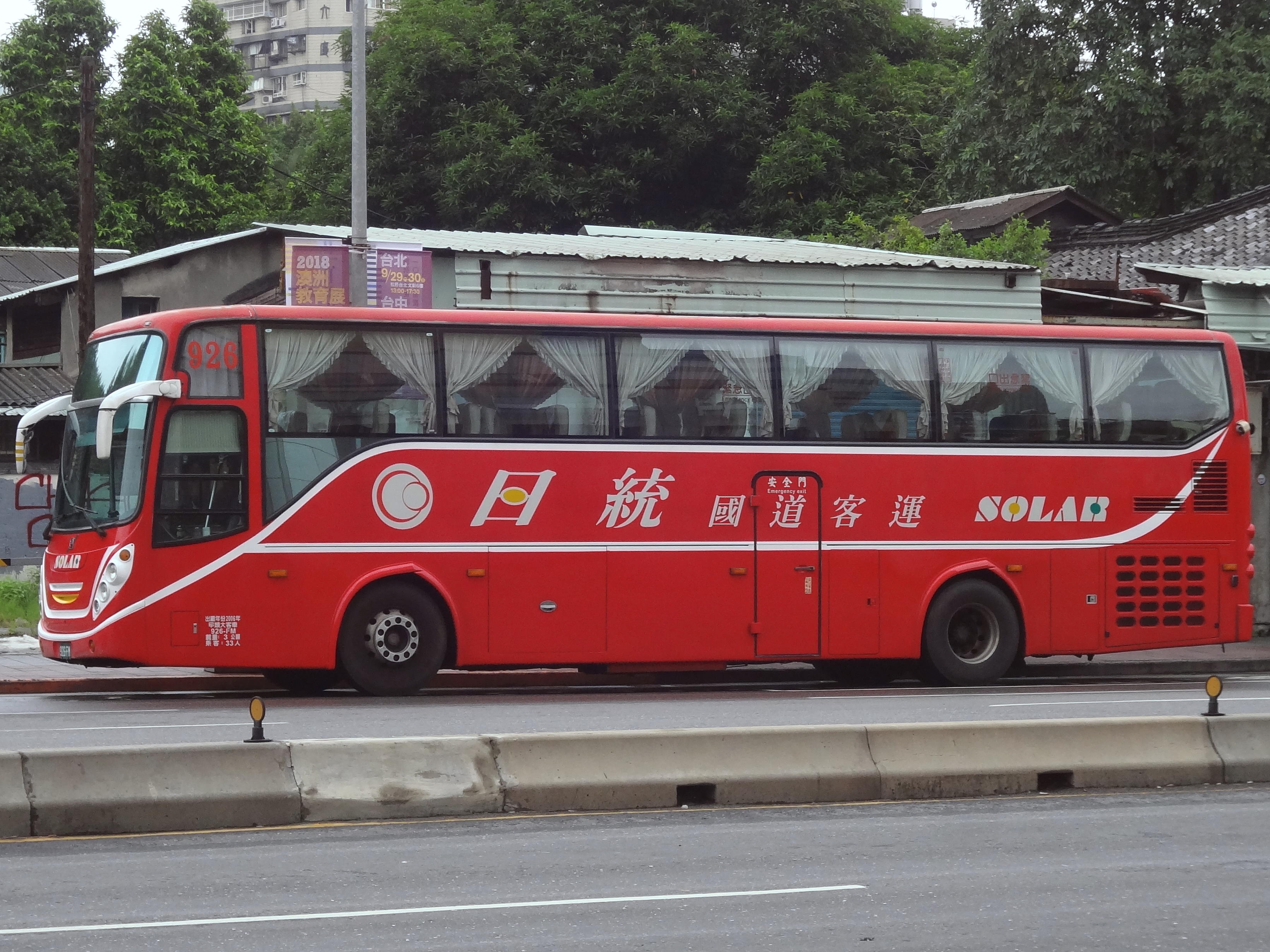
Solar Bus Nan Jye-bodied Volvo B12B in Taiwan

== See also ==
- List of buses
