= Volvo I-Shift =

Automated Manual Transmission Gearbox manufactured by Volvo for Volvo Trucks and Buses

The Volvo I-Shift is an automated manual transmission developed by Volvo subsidiary Volvo Powertrain AB for Volvo Trucks and Volvo Buses, with 12 forward gears and 4 reverse gears. It became available for trucks in 2001 and later buses in 2004.

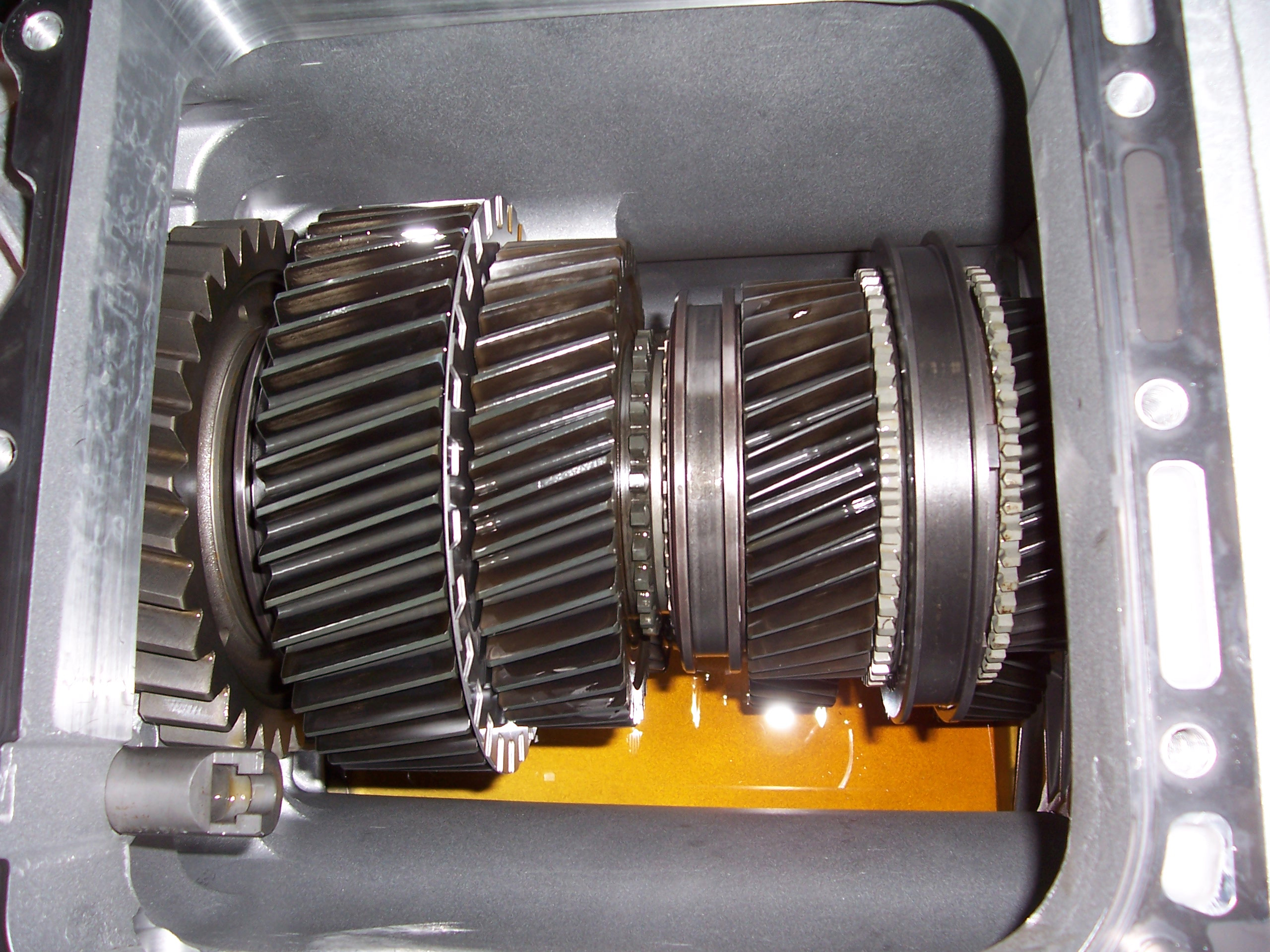
Inside view of a Volvo I-Shift transmission

== Design ==
Technically the I-Shift is an unsynchronised parallel-shaft gearbox, with an electronic control unit, responsible for operating the pneumatic system that handles the clutch and shifts. It constantly receives information about vehicle speed, acceleration, weight, road grade, torque demand and more, and can adjust revs and engine brake effect, the main shaft speed plate is responsible for the transmission speed and revs per particular gear in motion in correspondence with the gear file on ECU. The I-Shift uses different software for different type of application.

The I-Shift has no clutch pedal. It is controlled either by a gearstick mounted on the driver's seat or by buttons on the dashboard. With the gearstick, the driver can use buttons to manually select gear, although this feature is disabled on some vehicles (where the gearstick has no buttons).

The different versions of the I-Shift are named automatic transmission (AT) or automatic transmission overdrive (ATO). The standard versions have a gear ratio of 1:1, while the overdrive has a ratio of 0.78:1, suitable for long-distance use. The numbers show maximum torque in hundreds of newton metres, plus 12 for the number of gears. The last part of the name is a letter showing its generation, with C for Euro III and IV, D for Euro V and EEV, and E and F for the Euro VI version.

Known versions

- AT2412C, AT2512C, AT2812C, ATO2512C, ATO3112C
- AT2412D, AT2612D, AT2812D, ATO2612D, ATO3112D, ATO3512D
- AT2412E, AT2612E, AT2812E, ATO2612E, ATO3112E, ATO3512E

=== I-Shift Dual Clutch ===
In June 2014, Volvo Trucks presented a new dual-clutch version of the I-Shift, known as SPO2812, with overdrive and a maximum torque of 2800 N·m. The dual-clutch version is only available for trucks up to 540 hp.

The I-Shift Dual Clutch has two input shafts which are alternatively connected to the engine through two clutches. When driving, the first gear is engaged by one input shaft while the other one pre-selects the next gear. At the actual gear change, the previously engaged clutch is disengaged as the idling clutch is engaged at the same time. This results in a Powershift and seamless transfer of power.

==== I-Shift with Crawler Gears ====
In 2016, Volvo launched a new member of the I-Shift family, the I-Shift with Crawler Gears. The new gears, which are added to the automated transmission, provides exceptional startability for trucks carrying heavy loads and can start from standstill for up to 325 tonnes of GVW.

The I-Shift with Crawler Gears adds 1 or 2 Crawler Gears as optional, the first one has a low crawler gear with a 19.38 to 1 ratio and the second one has an ultra low crawler gear with a 32.04 to 1 ratio, they also enable to drive as slowly as 0.5 km/h.
