= Irizar Century =

Series of Coach body made by Irizar

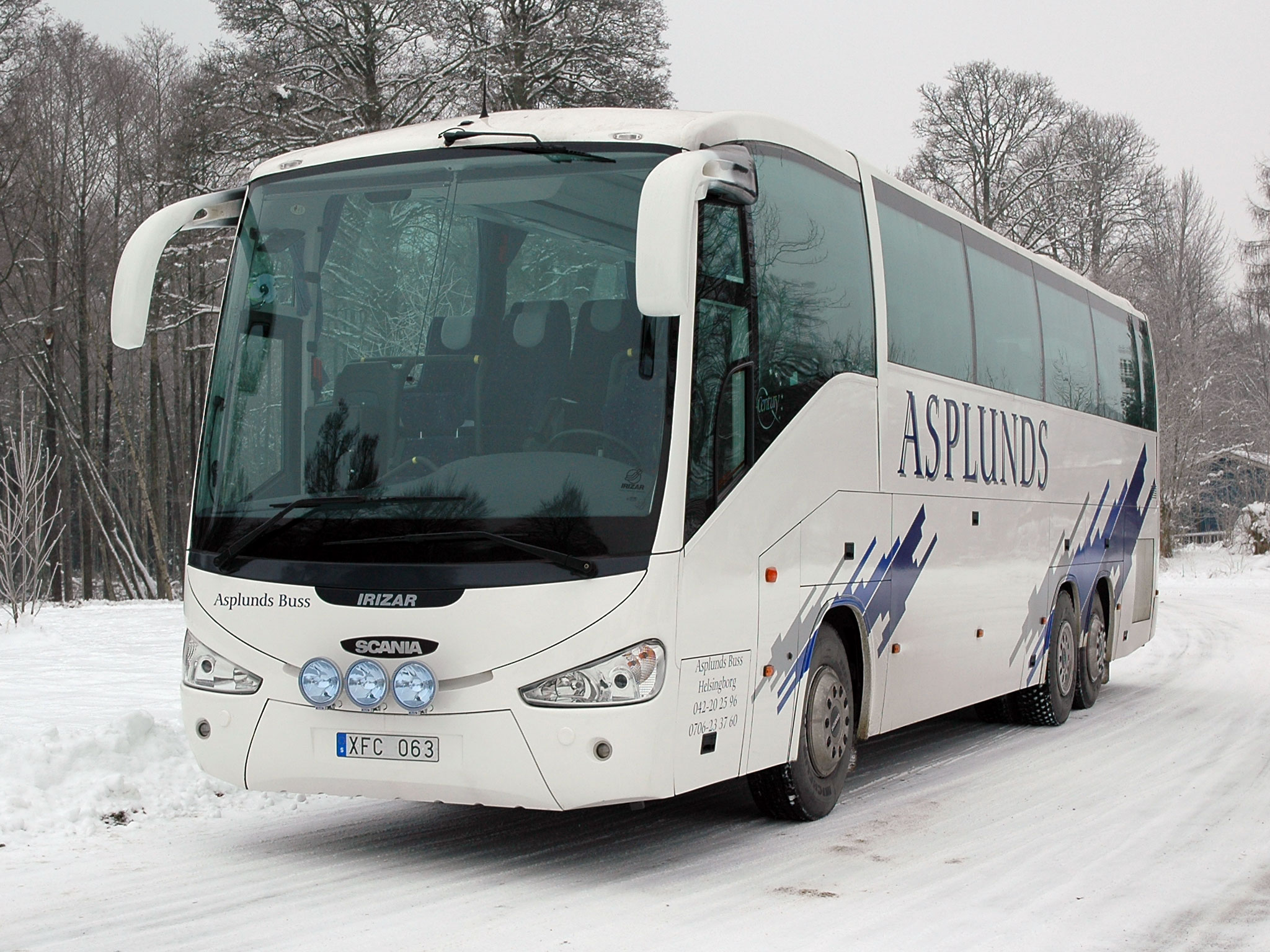
- An Irizar Century-bodied Scania coach.

Overview
- Manufacturer: Irizar

Body and chassis
- Doors: 1
- Floor type: Step entrance

The Irizar Century is a coach body manufactured by Irizar on Iveco, MAN, Mercedes-Benz, Scania and Volvo chassis.

It has many different bodystyles and are usually identified via the OBRA number on information plate next to the door.

The Century model has been replaced by the Irizar i6 but given the continued popularity of the model, Irizar has continued production of the Century for several years.

== Chassis ==
Known chassis which the Irizar Century body has been built upon:

- Iveco Delta
- Iveco Eurorider
- MAN 18.360/370/420 HOCL
- Mercedes-Benz O404
- Mercedes-Benz OH1830
- Mercedes-Benz OC500RF
- Scania K113CLA/TLA/CLB/TLB/CRB/TRB
- Scania K94/114/124EB
- Scania K94/114/124IB
- Scania L94IB
- Scania K340EB/K380EB/K400EB/K420EB /K380IB/K400IB
- Scania F94/Scania F-series
- Volvo B7R
- Volvo B10M
- Volvo B11R
- Volvo B12
- Volvo B13R
