= Irizar =

Spanish bus manufacturing company

Irizar Group

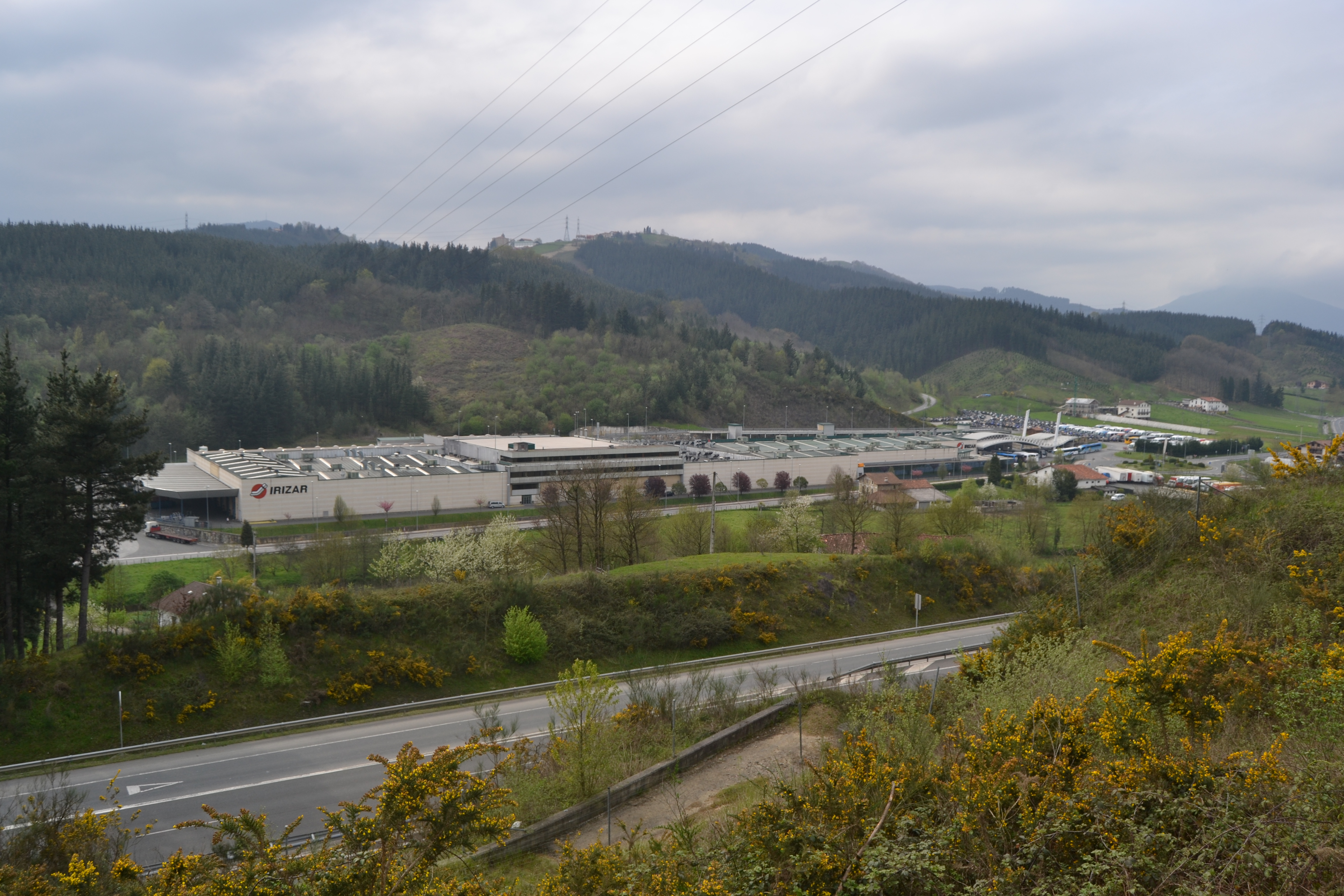
- Irizar headquarters in Ormaiztegi
- Industry: Manufacturing
- Founded: 1889; 137 years ago
- Founder: José Francisco Irizar Catarain
- Headquarters: Ormaiztegi, Spain
- Key people: Rafael Sterling (Chief Executive Officer)
- Products: Buses
- Production output: 3,000 buses per year
- Number of employees: 3,500+
- Website: www.irizar.com

Irizar Group (or simply Irizar) is a Spanish-based manufacturer of luxury buses and coaches. Established in 1889, the company is located in Ormaiztegi in the Basque Country, Spain. With a commercial presence in over 90 countries, its turnover exceeded 600 million euros in 2017.

It is the market-leading builder of coach vehicle bodies in Spain (with a market share of over 40%), and ranks second in Europe, its coach bodies being available in many parts of the world. Apart from its main plant in the Basque Country, which produces around 1400 bodies per year, Irizar also has factories in other countries: in Skhirat (Morocco), Botucatu (Brazil), Querétaro (Mexico) and Centurion (South Africa). Together they have a production of over 3,500 bodies and integral vehicles per year. The Irízar group also owns Hispacold, which makes air conditioning systems for coaches, and Masats, makers of automated bus and coach doors and ramps.

Apart from its own integral vehicles range, Irizar works especially closely with Scania, having jointly designed the i4 body. Irizar bodies can also be found on other manufacturers' platforms, such as Iveco, MAN, Volvo, and Mercedes-Benz.

== Group companies ==
- Irizar, S. Coop
- Irizar e-mobility
- Datik
- Masats
- Hispacold
- Jema Energy
- Alconza
- Creatio

== Products ==
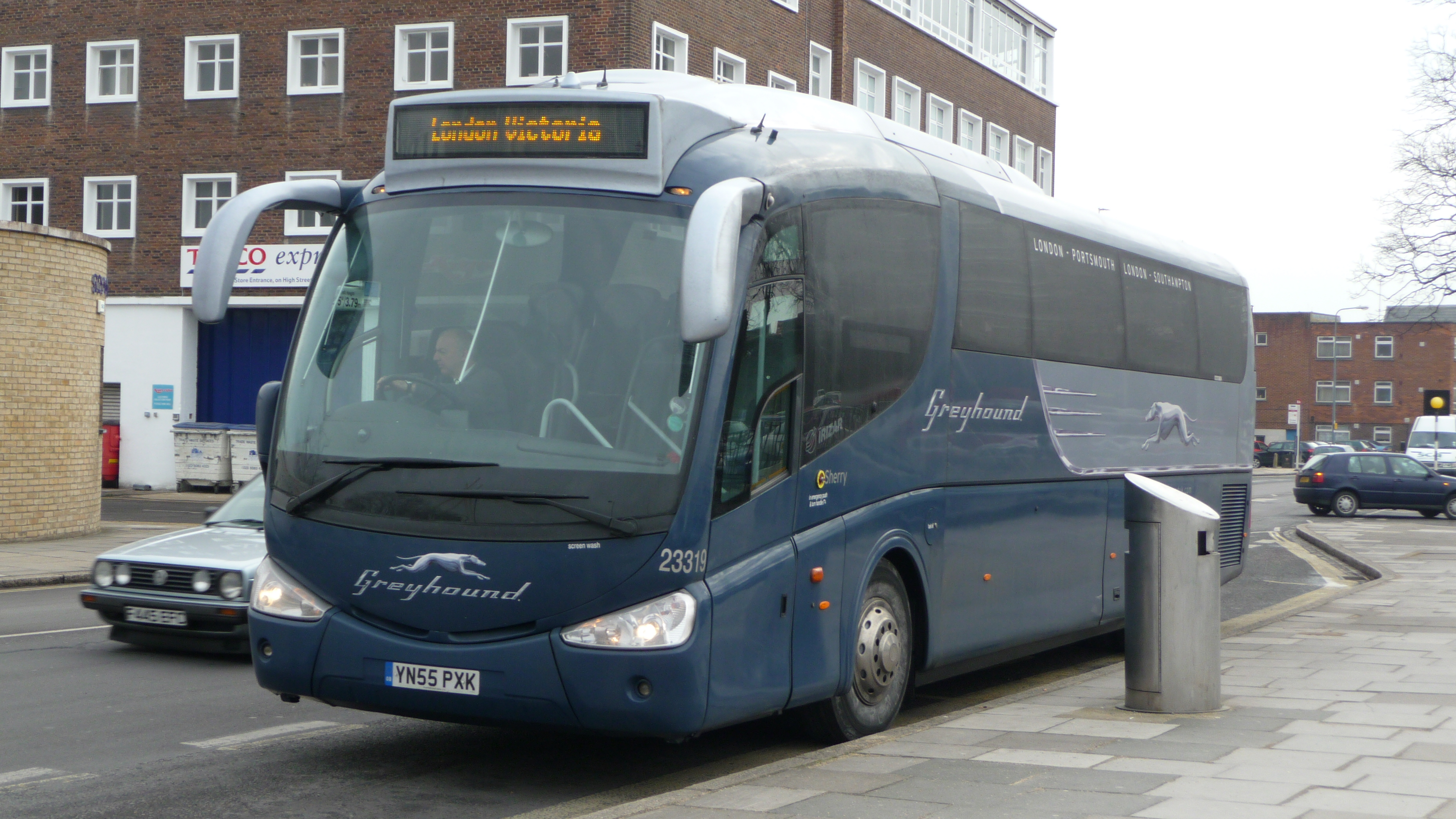
Irizar PB (on Scania K114EB chassis) for Greyhound UK in the UK

=== Current ===
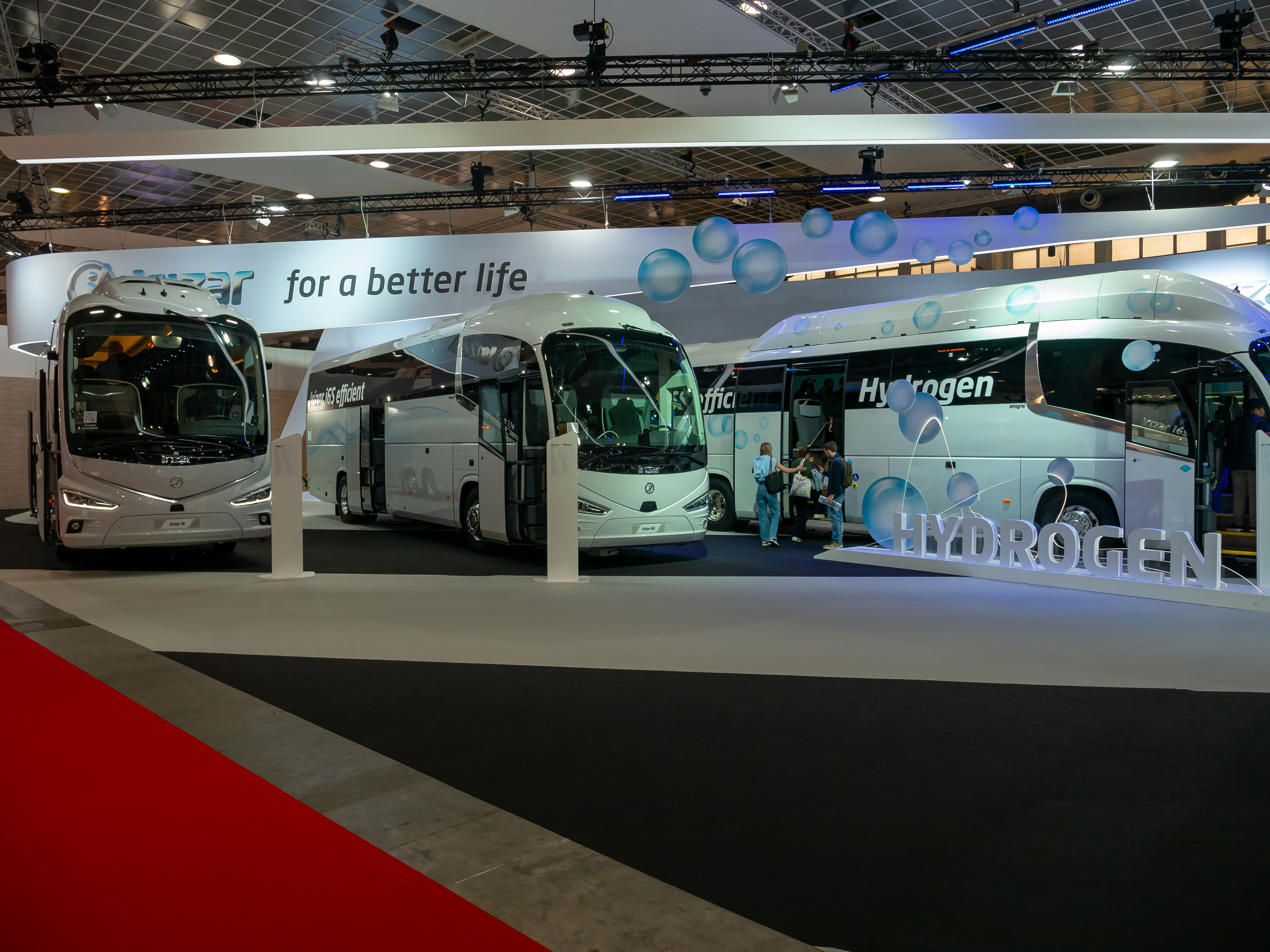
Irizar lineup at a bus exhibition

- Irizar ie bus
- Irizar ie tram
- Irizar i3le
- Irizar i4
- Irizar i6
- Irizar i6S
- Irizar i6S Efficient
- Irizar i8

=== Former ===
- Century
- Irizar Intercentury
- Irizar New Century
- PB
- Irizar i2e

== Gallery ==
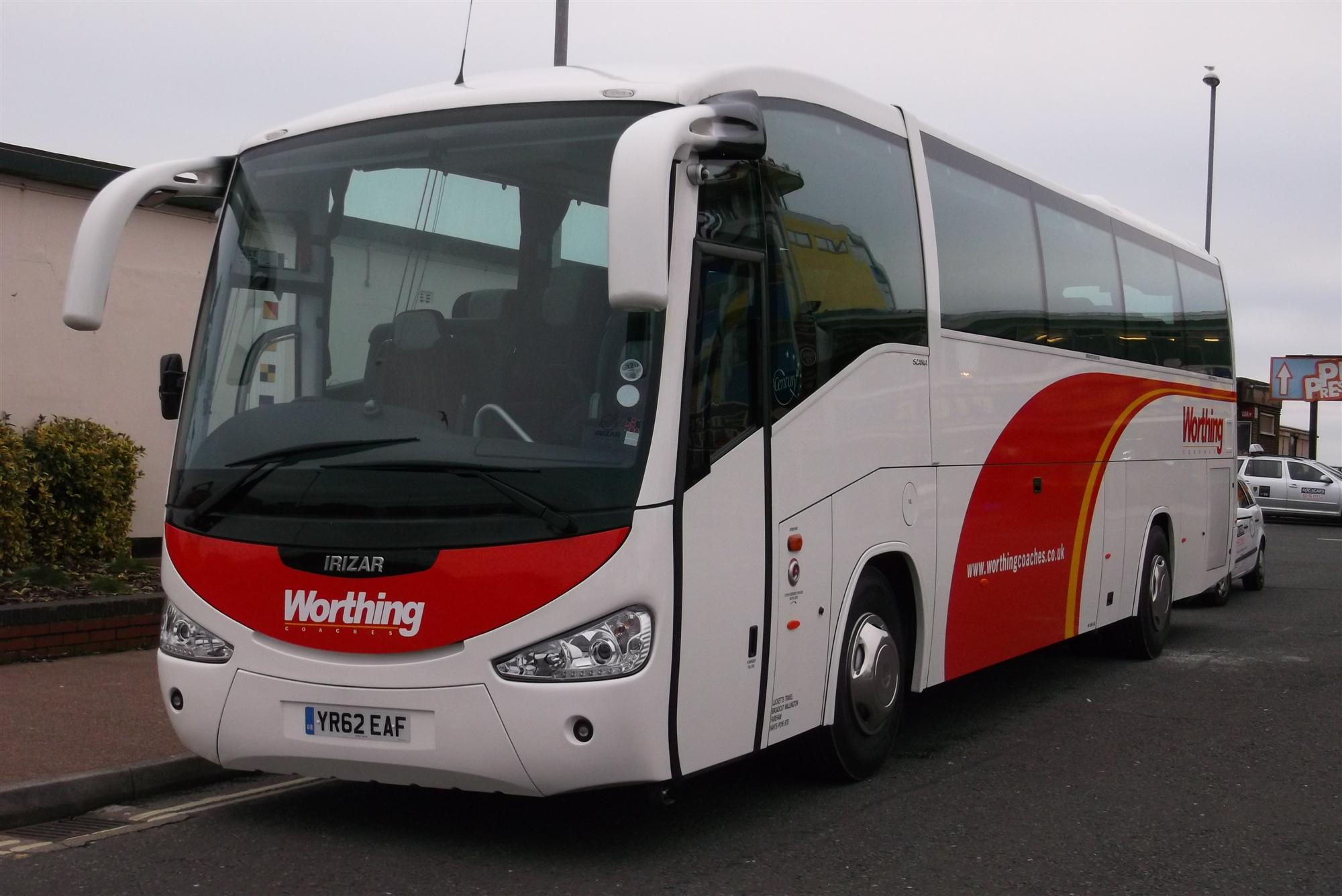
Irizar Century (on Scania K340EB chassis) for Worthing Coaches in the UK

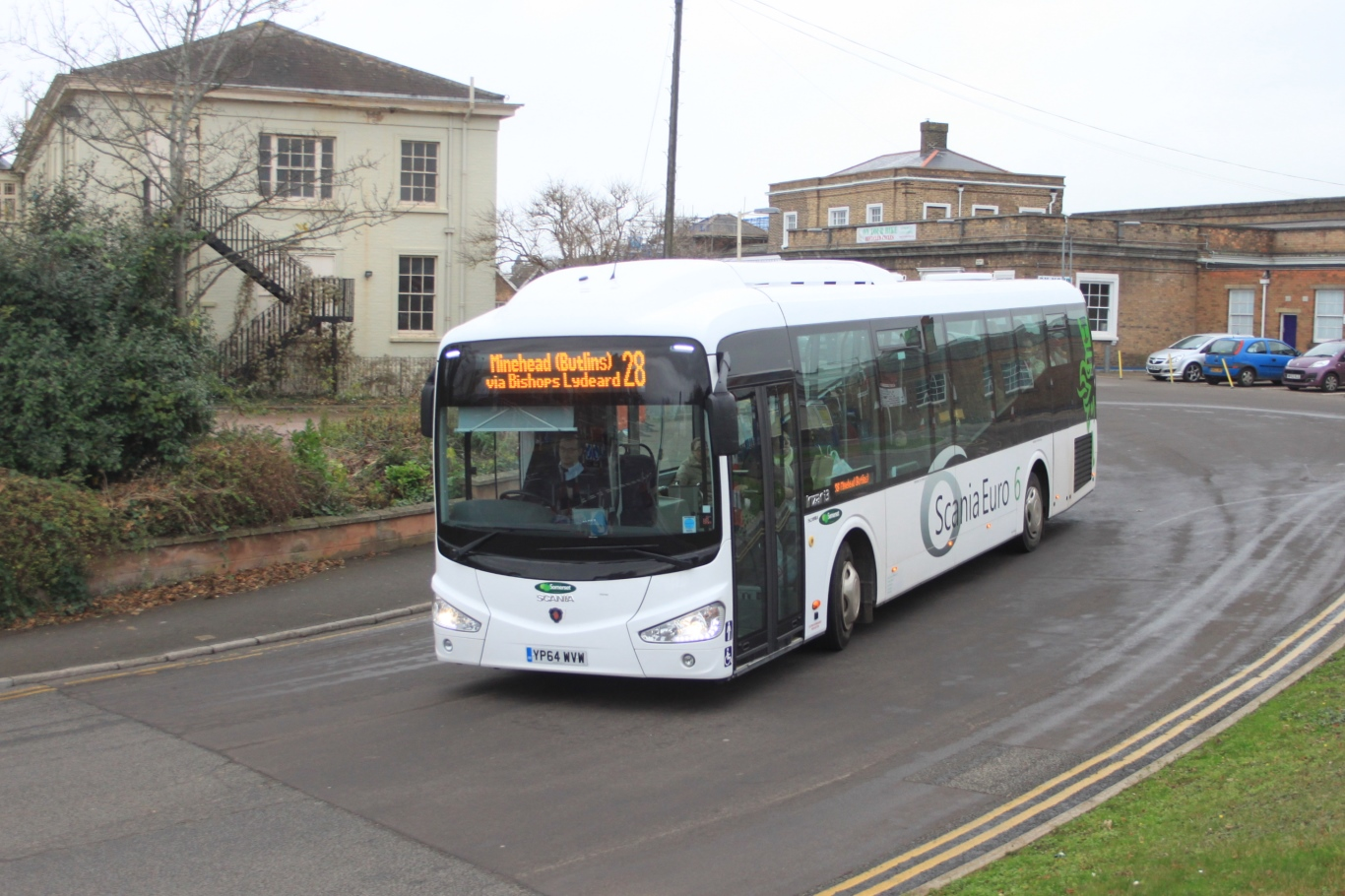
Irizar i3LE (on Scania K250UB chassis) demonstrator in the UK

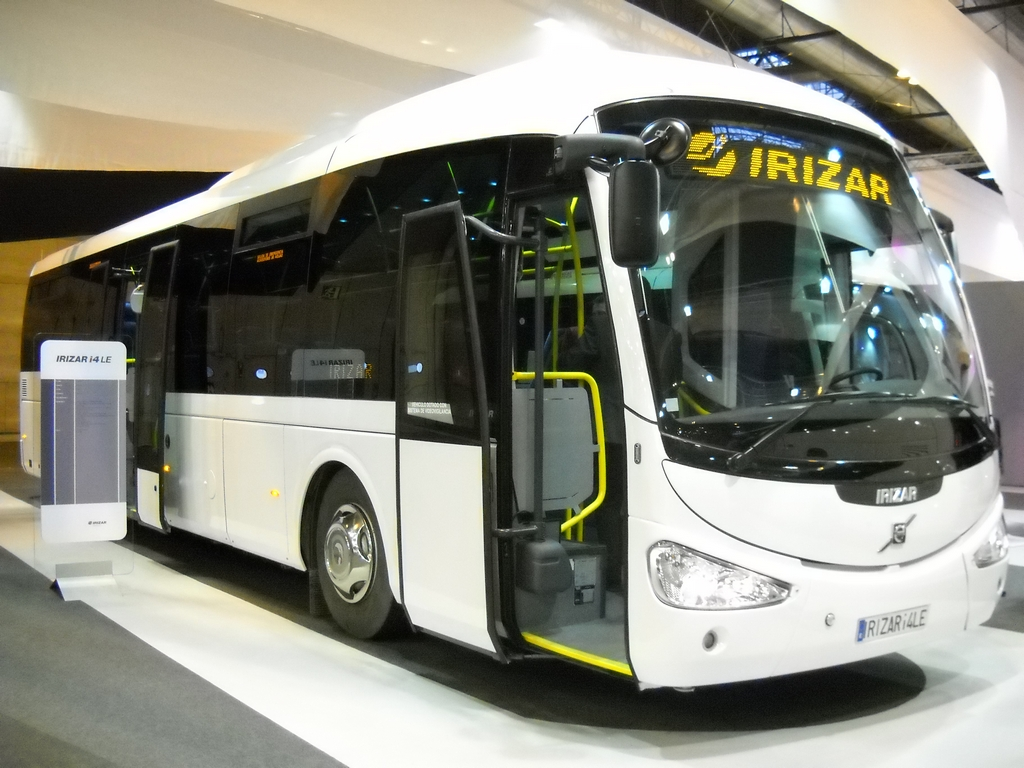
Irizar i4LE in Madrid

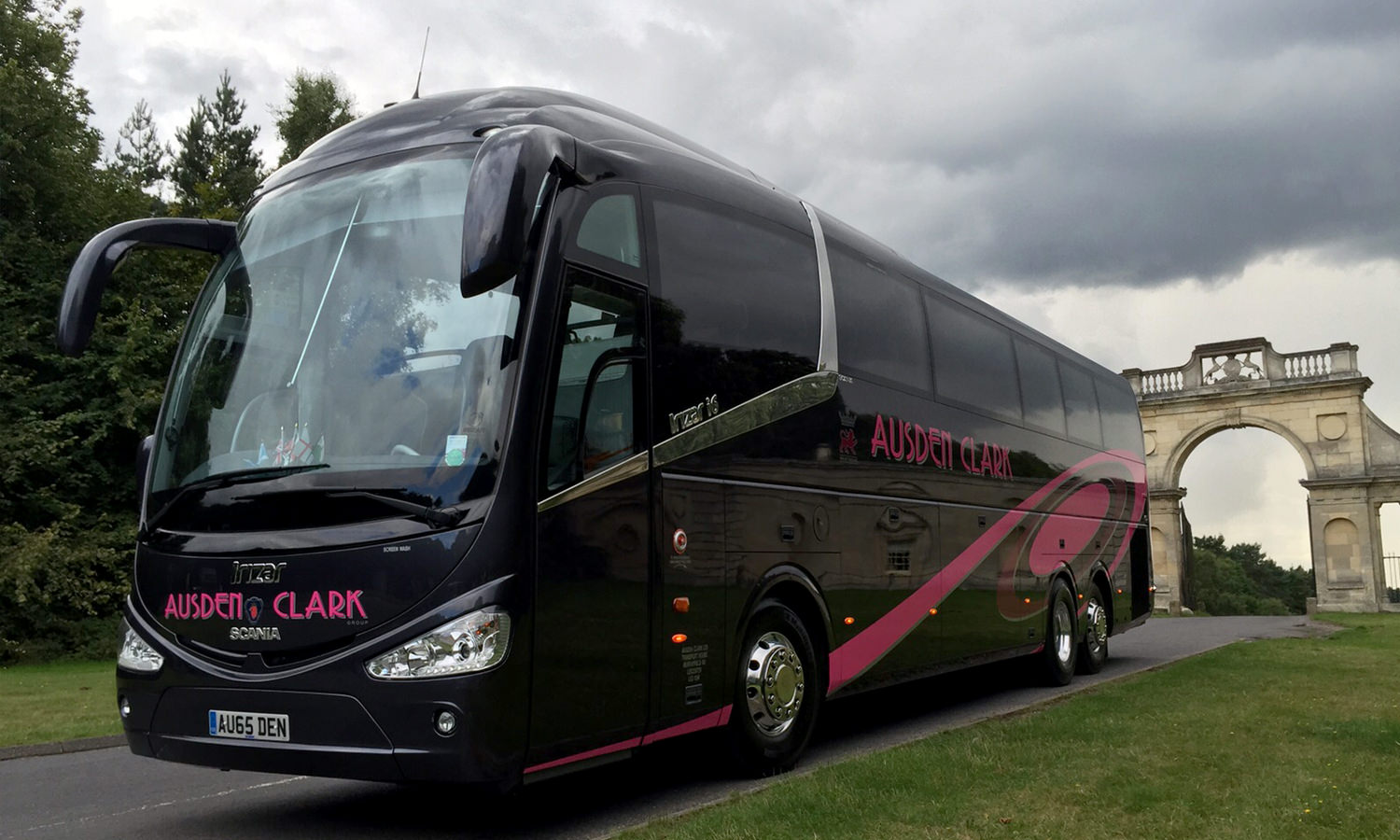
Irizar i6 (on Scania K480EB chassis) for Ausden Clark in the UK

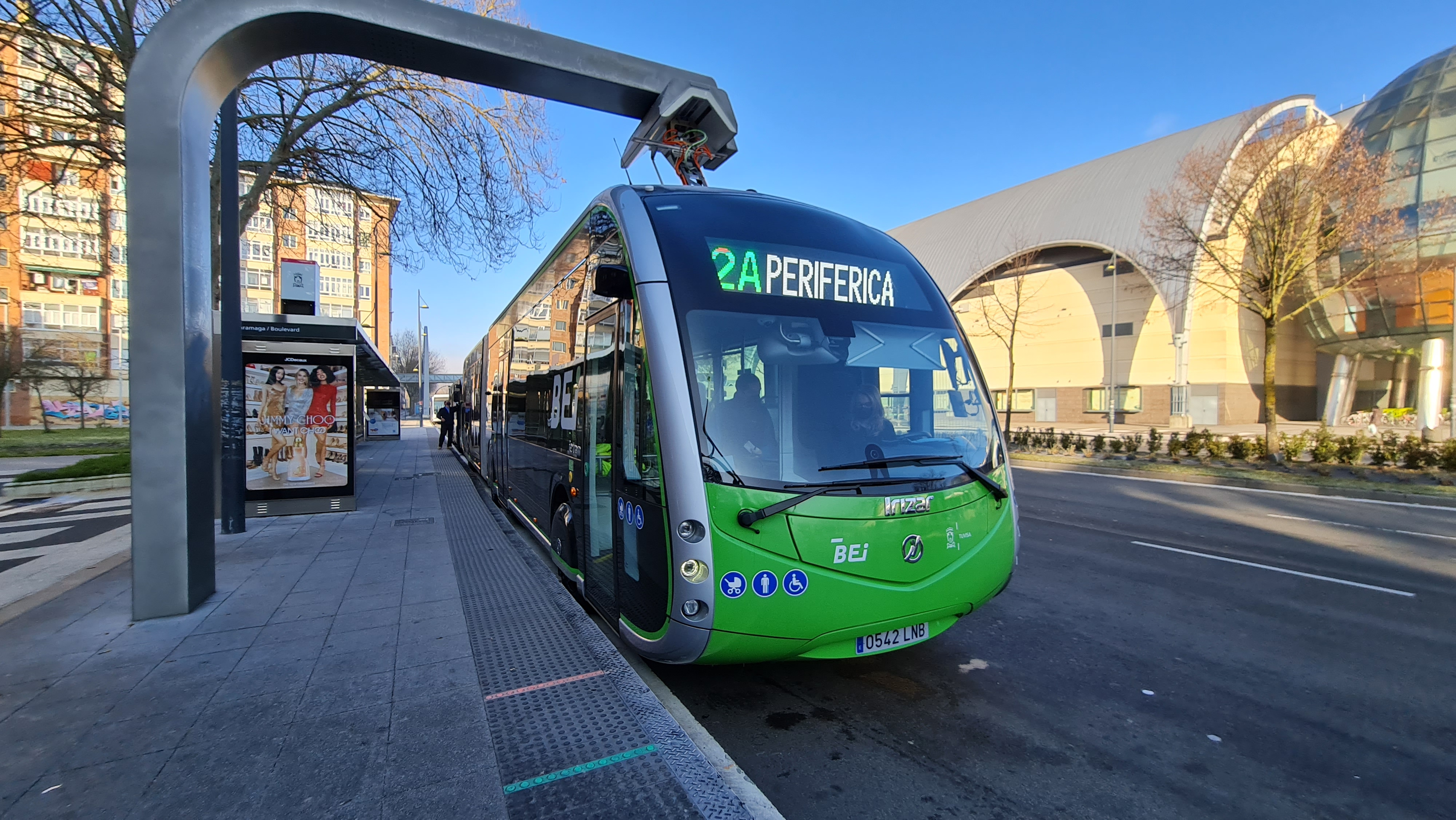
Irizar ie tram being charged by an overhead power source

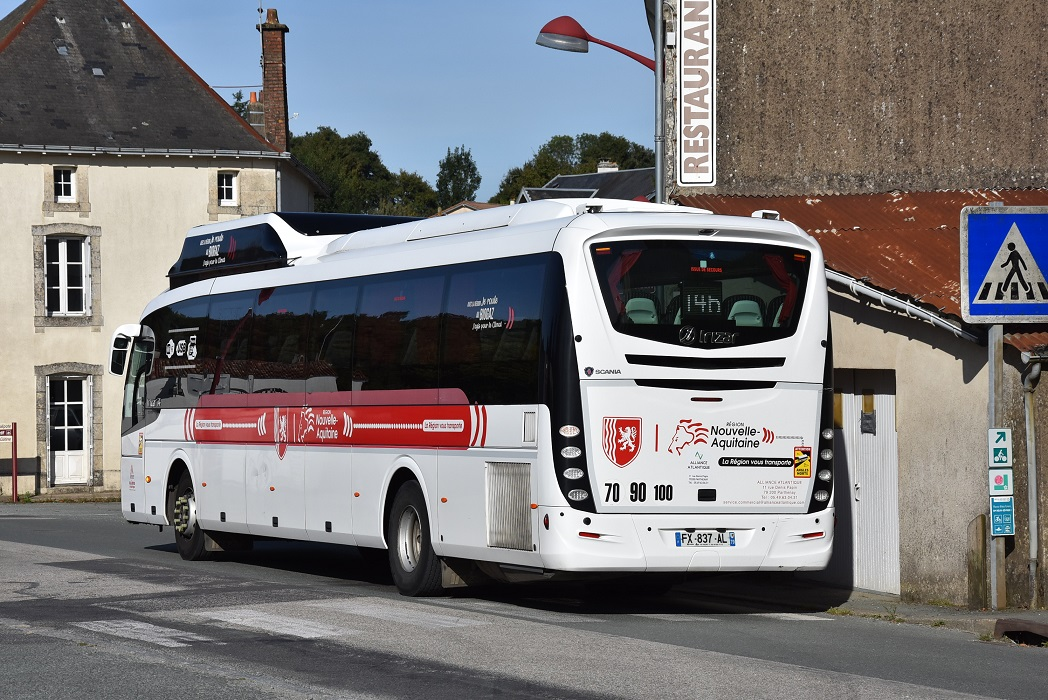
Irizar i4 biogas, France

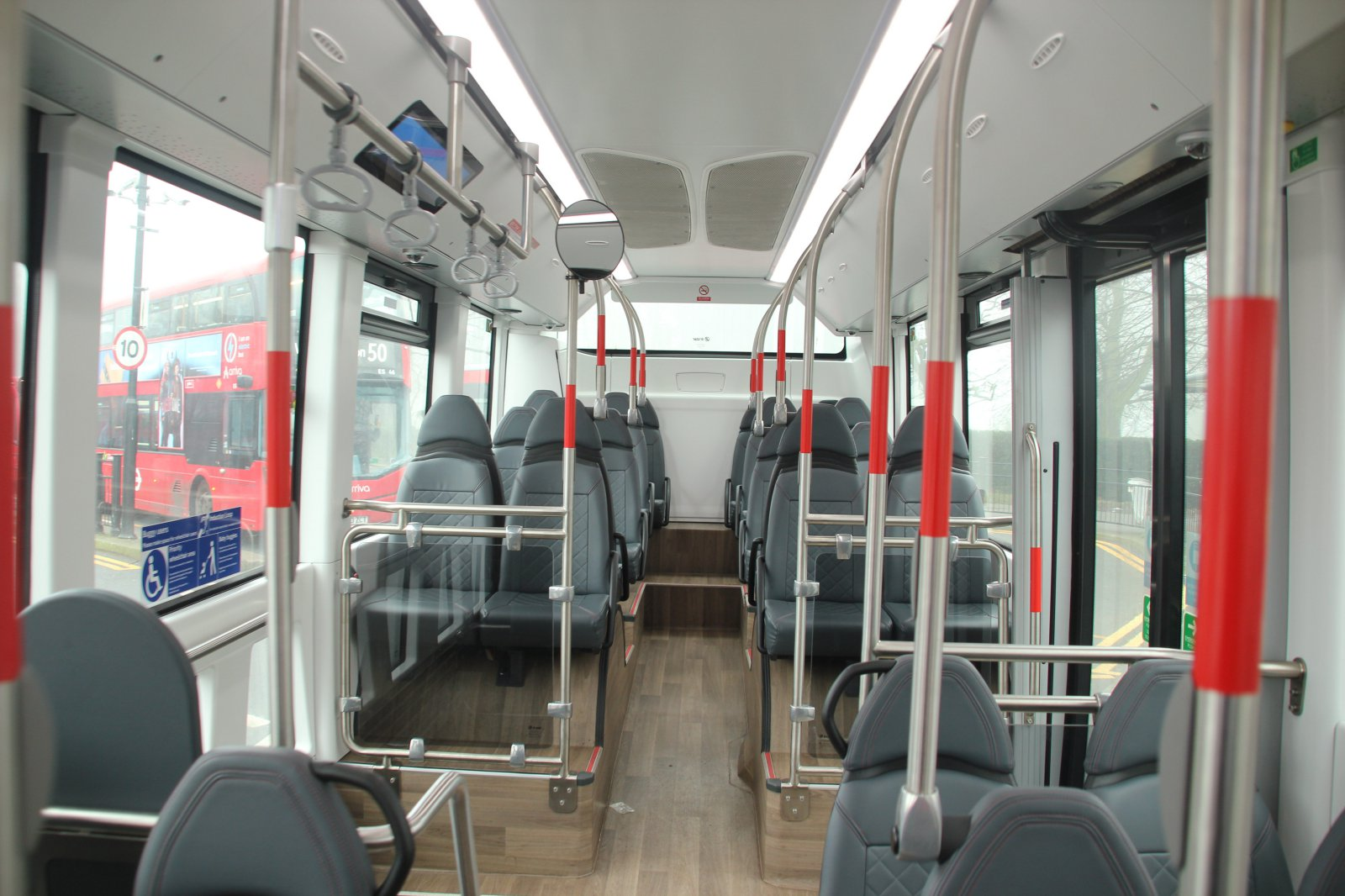
Interior of the Metrobus Irizar ie tram in the UK
