= Greyhound UK =

Low-cost coach service in the United Kingdom owned by FirstGroup

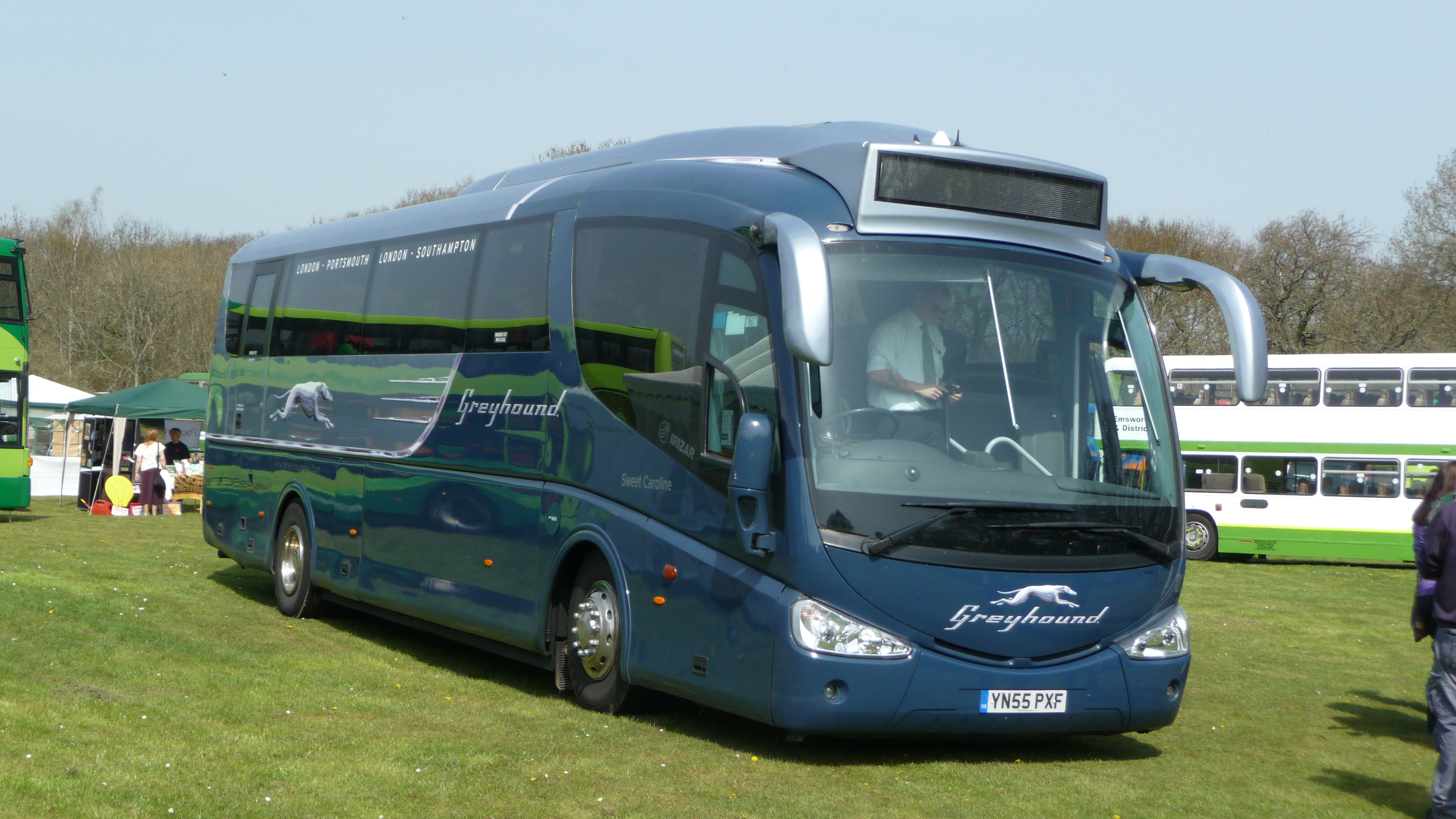
- Greyhound Scania K114EB 23315 Sweet Caroline on the Isle of Wight in April 2010
- Parent: FirstGroup
- Founded: 14 September 2009
- Defunct: 5 December 2015
- Service area: South East England; South Wales
- Service type: Intercity coach service
- Operator: First Cymru; First Hampshire & Dorset; First Glasgow
- Website: www.greyhounduk.com

Greyhound UK was a low-cost intercity scheduled coach service in the United Kingdom owned by FirstGroup. It was launched in September 2009 following their purchase of the long-established Greyhound service in the United States and developed in the following two years in South East England and South Wales. The last service ceased in December 2015.

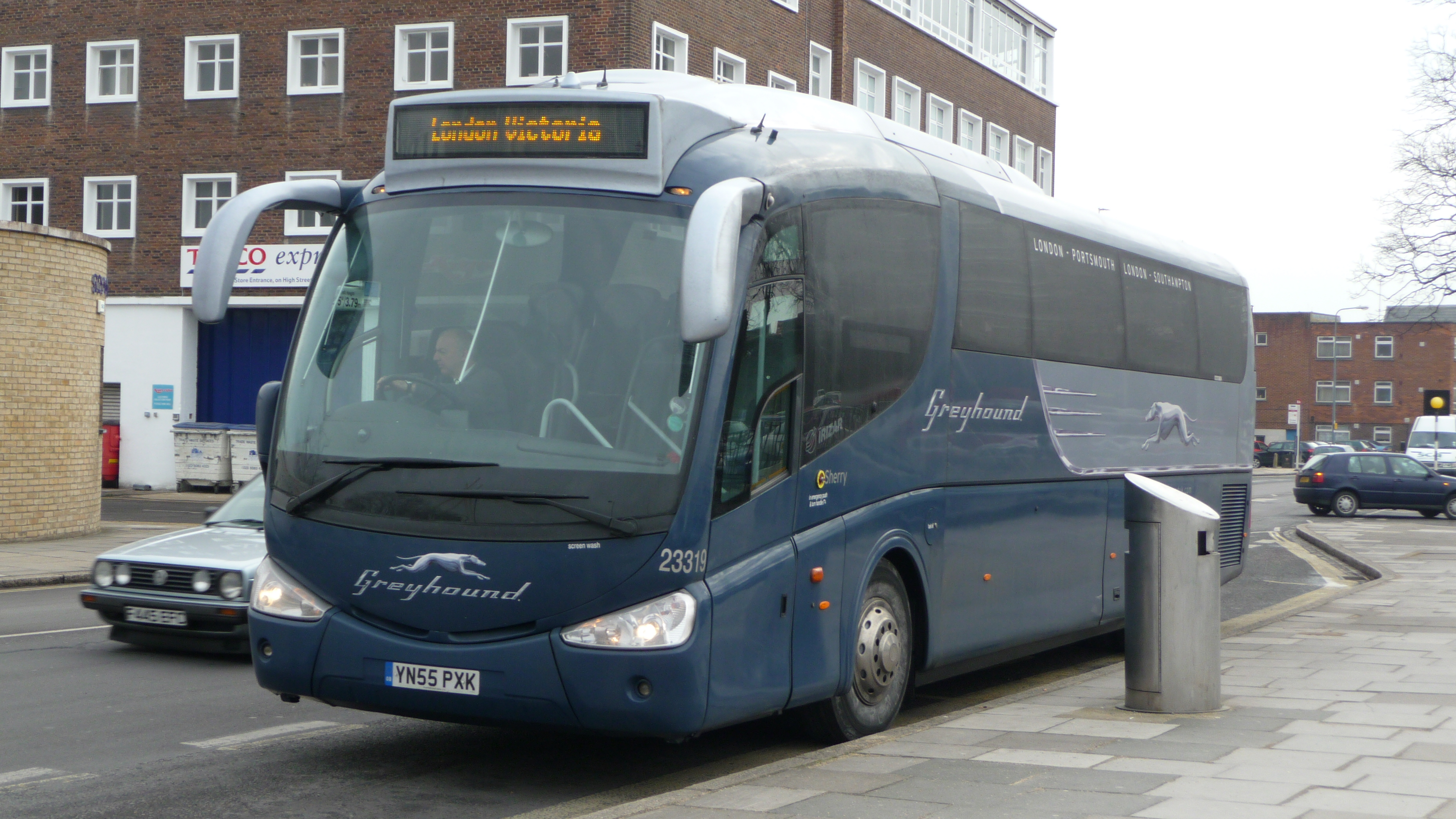
Irizar PB bodied Scania K114EB, operated by Greyhound in UK, 2010

== History ==
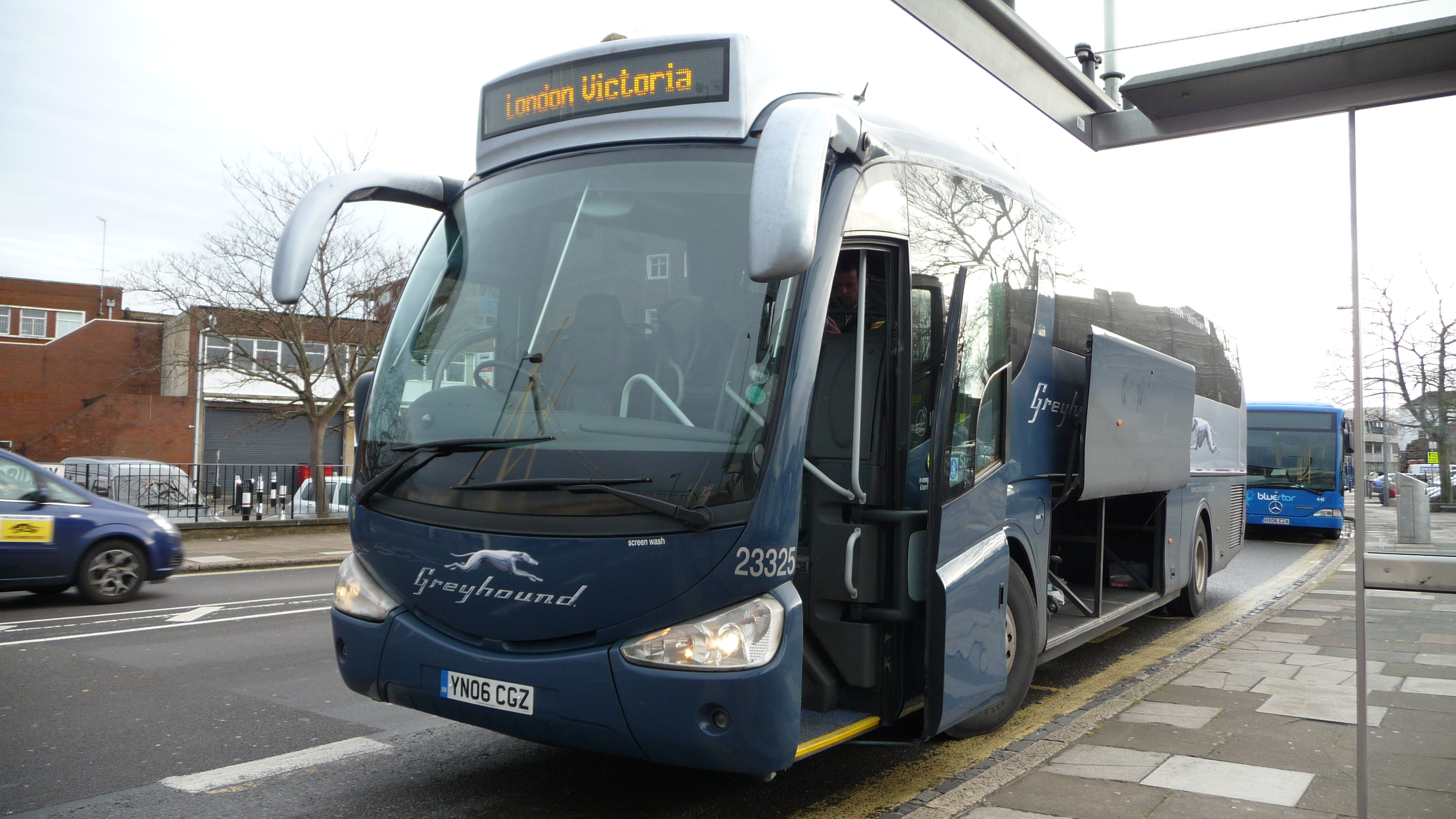
Irizar PB bodied Scania K114EB 23325 Peggy Sue in Southampton in December 2009

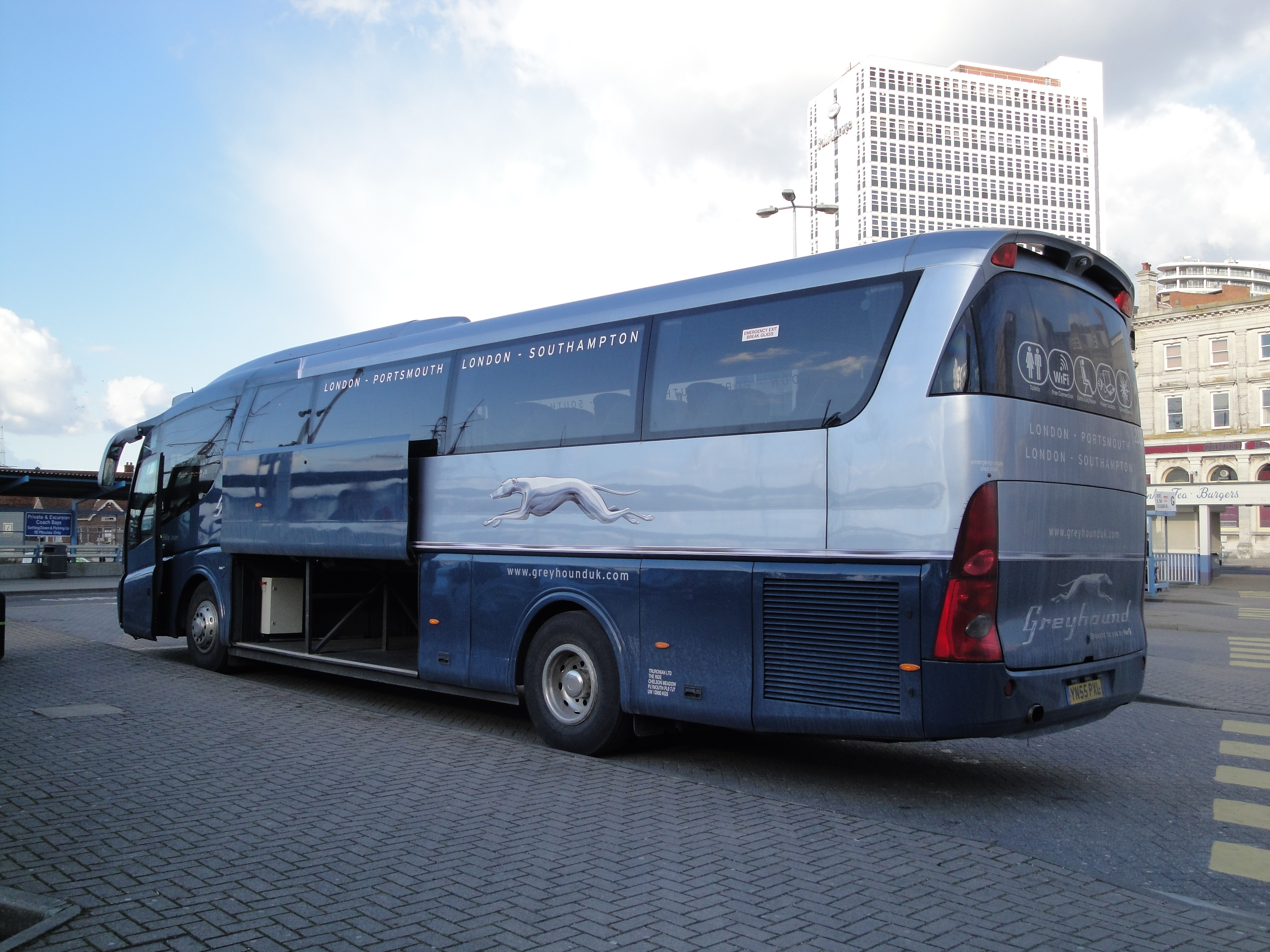
The rear of Scania K114EB 23320 Billie Jean, pictured ready to load at Portsmouth February 2010

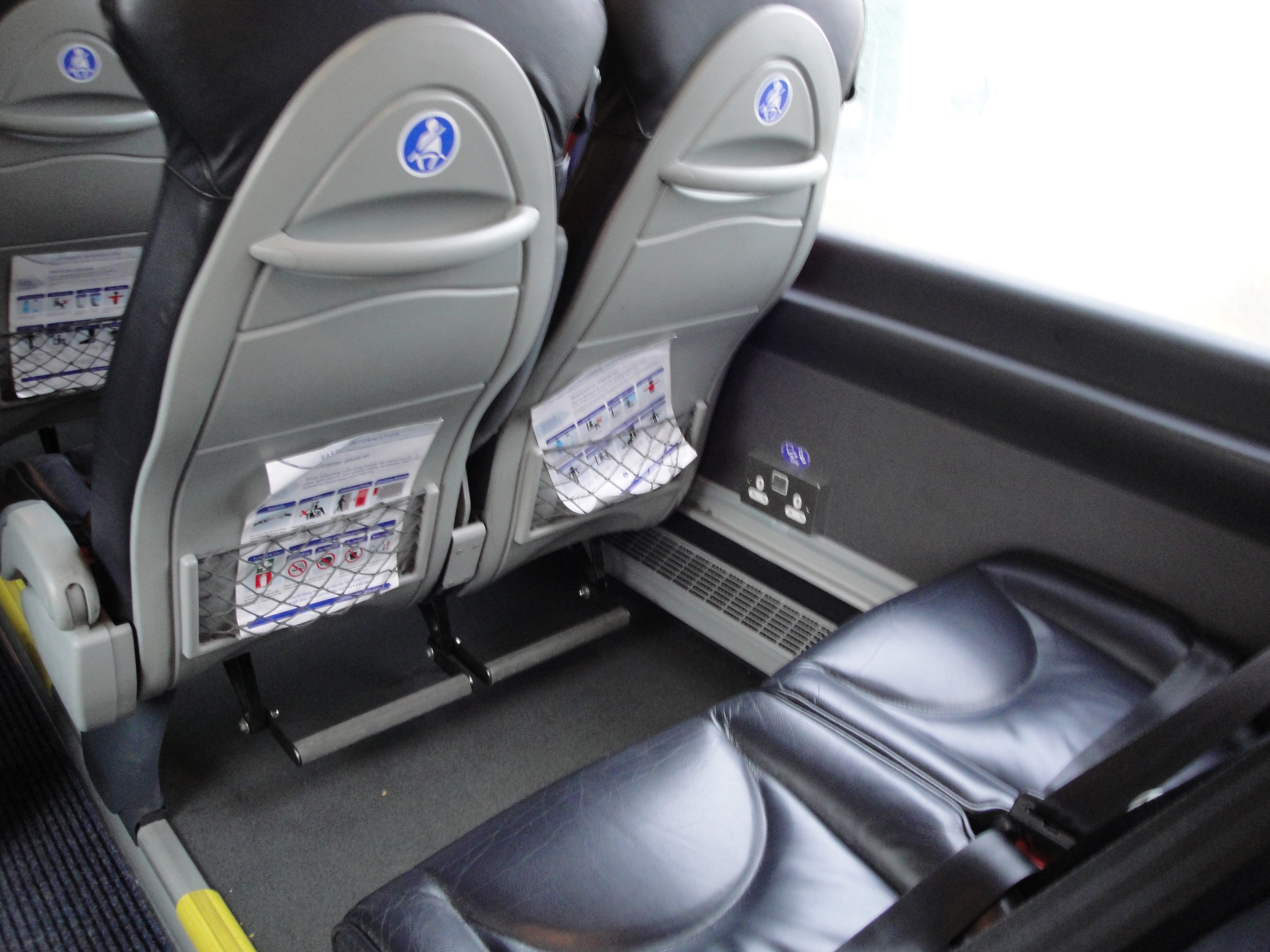
Interior of Scania K114EB 23316 Mrs Robinson

Greyhound UK began operations on 14 September 2009 with an hourly service between London and Portsmouth or Southampton. Services were introduced from London to Bournemouth and Poole in 2010. The 'Shuttle 100' service between Cardiff and Swansea was transferred to Greyhound from First Cymru the same year. In January 2011 operation of overnight coach services between London and Glasgow was transferred to Greyhound from First Glasgow.

The London to Poole/Dorset services ceased in November 2012. The London/Glasgow service ceased in September 2012. The Swansea/Cardiff service was extended to Bristol Airport in March 2013 but was withdrawn on 17 March 2015. The service ceased on 5 December 2015.

== Service ==
Greyhound UK's service was presented as upmarket, with free wireless internet, extra legroom and reclining seats, using refurbished coaches painted in the same livery as recently introduced by Greyhound in the United States.

The first service from Portsmouth on the first day of customer operations was operated by Driver Francis Oldfield.

== History of name ==
The earliest use of the Greyhound name and logo for coach services in England was by Greyhound Motors in 1921. The name and logo continued to be used by Bristol Omnibus Company (which bought Greyhound in 1936) until 1972 when their coach services were re-branded as National Express. FirstGroup now owns the former Bristol Omnibus Company, but their revival of the name is not connected to the former use of the name by their subsidiary; instead, it follows FirstGroup's acquisition of the owner of the American Greyhound Lines operation in February 2007, with the logo and livery adopted for the United Kingdom. It was not associated with the former Western Greyhound in Cornwall.

== Fleet ==
The Greyhound fleet consisted of 11 Irizar PB bodied Scania K114EB coaches. They were numbered in the same fleet numbering system as other FirstGroup vehicles, and also carried women’s names from popular American songs:

23315 - Sweet Caroline
23316 - Mrs. Robinson
23317 - Good Golly Miss Molly
23318 - Mandy
23319 - Sherry
23320 - Billie Jean
23321 - Proud Mary
23322 - Barbara Anne
23323 - Sharona
23324 - Joelene
23325 - Peggy Sue

The coaches originally had 49 seats, and were purchased in 2005/06 for use on FirstGroup's National Express contracted work. They were based at First's depots at Bristol, Cheltenham and Northampton and used on National Express routes 040 Bristol to London Victoria, 200 Bristol to Gatwick Airport, 412 Gloucester to London Victoria, 222 Hereford to Gatwick Airport and 707 Northampton to Gatwick Airport. After refurbishment, they had only 41 seats, providing extra legroom and a 41" seat pitch, free wireless internet and at-seat power sockets.
