= First Cymru =

Bus operator in Swansea and South Wales

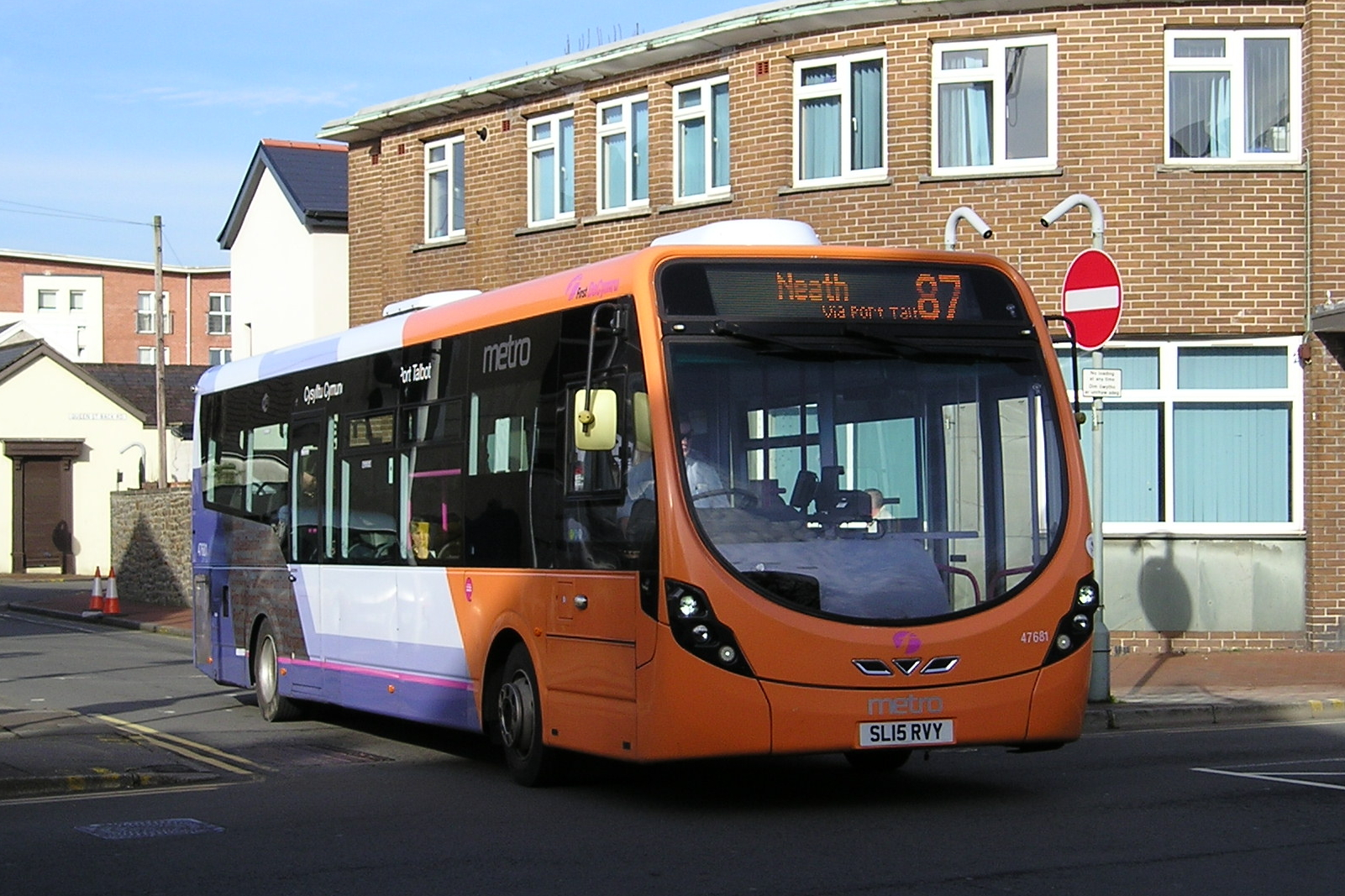
- First Bus Cymru, Wright Streetlite DF, SL15 RVY, in Neath, January 2019.
- Parent: FirstGroup
- Headquarters: Swansea
- Service area: South West Wales
- Service type: Bus & coach services
- Routes: 104 (October 2024)
- Depots: 6
- Fleet: 220 (October 2024)
- Chief executive: Doug Claringbold
- Website: firstbus.co.uk/cymru

First Cymru is an operator of bus services in South West Wales. It is a subsidiary of FirstGroup. With its headquarters previously in Swansea, it is now part of the First Wales and West region which also covers Bristol, Bath and Worcester, with its headquarters in Bristol. With 220 vehicles, it is the second largest bus operator in Wales after Stagecoach South Wales.

== History ==
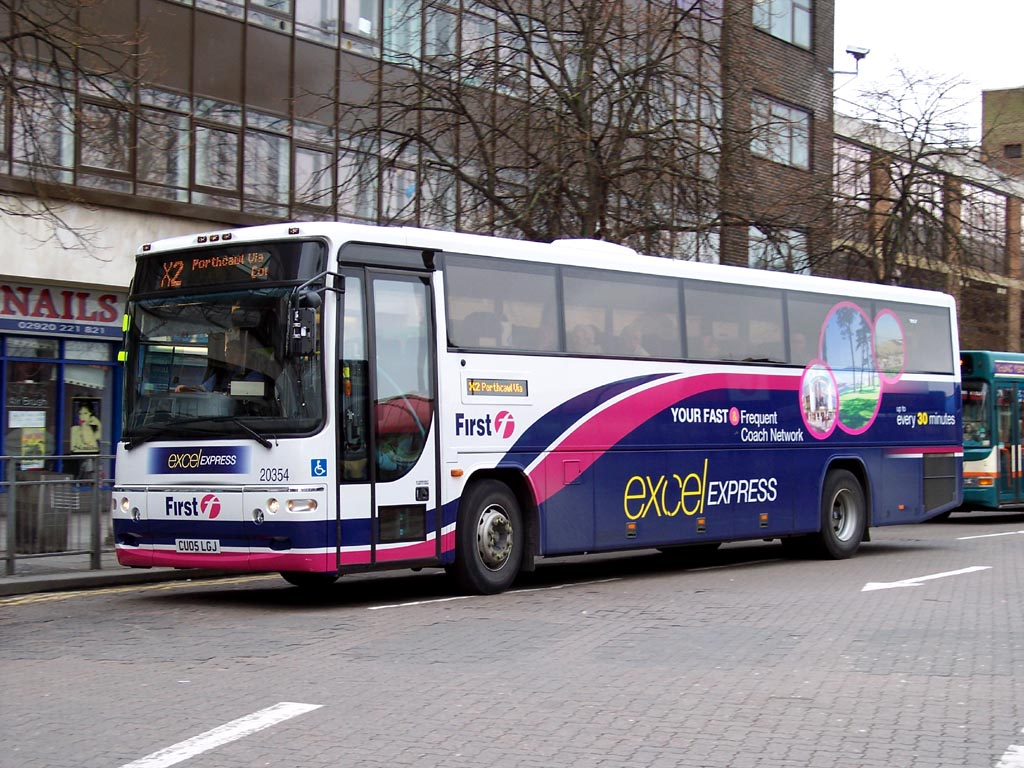
Plaxton bodied Volvo B7R in Cardiff in March 2006

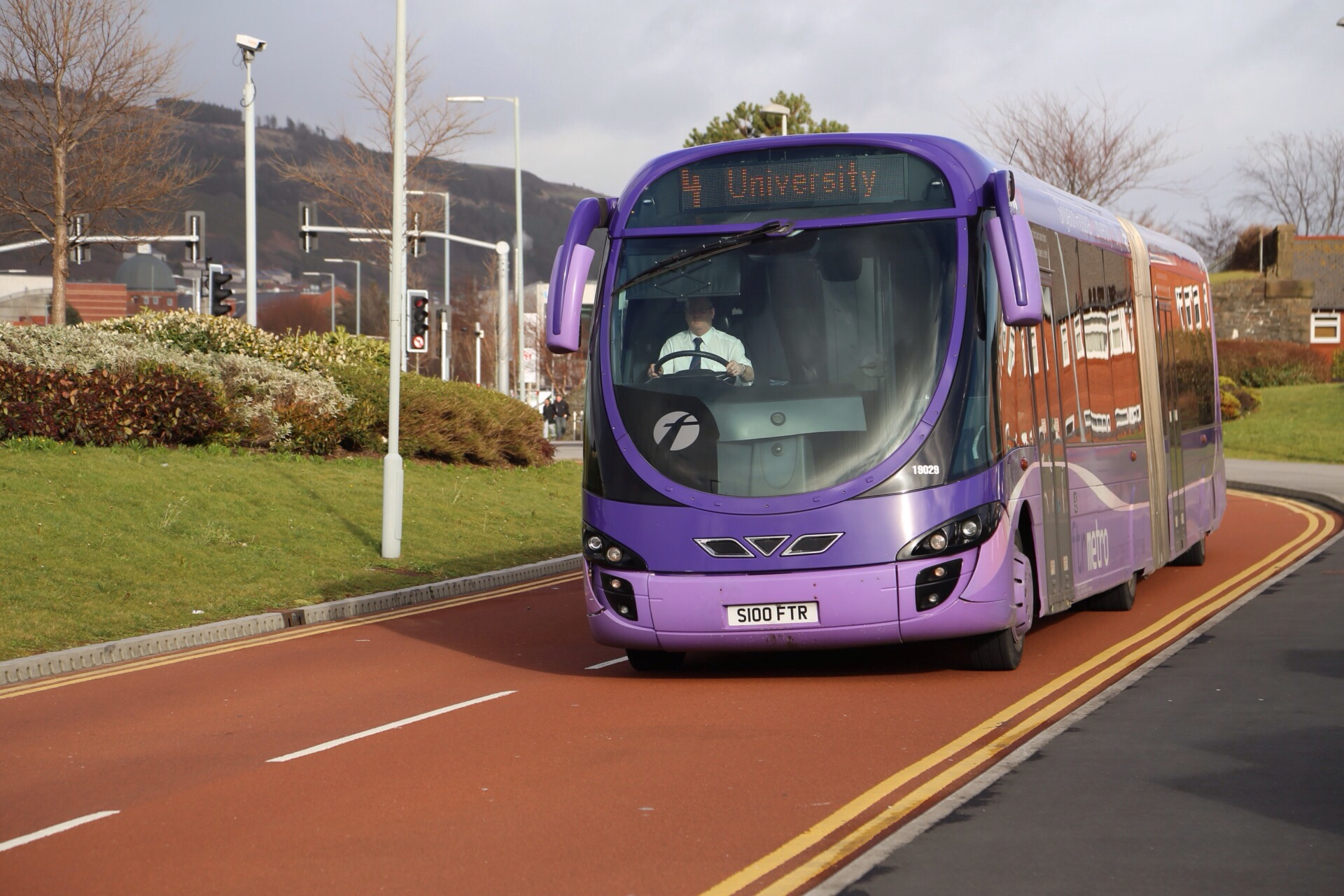
Wright StreetCar operating an Ftrmetro Swansea journey in February 2014

In 1987, South Wales Transport was sold during the privatisation of the National Bus Company in a management buy out.

In February 1990, along with Brewers Motor Services and United Welsh Coaches, South Wales Transport was sold to Badgerline. All initially retained their trading names but following Badgerline merging with GRT Group in April 1995 to form FirstBus, all Welsh operations were rebranded as First Cymru.

== Operations ==
The company operates 104 bus services in the South West Wales area, in and between Haverfordwest, Pembroke, Tenby, Carmarthen, Ammanford, Llanelli, Swansea, Pontardawe, Neath, Port Talbot, Maesteg, Bridgend and Cardiff. Following contract wins in April 2024, their network was expanded in Pembrokeshire and the Vale of Glamorgan, incorporating locations such as Narberth, Whitland, Barry and Cardiff Airport.

In addition to internal South Wales work, First Cymru also operate the TrawsCymru T1 service between Carmarthen and Aberystwyth under contract to the Welsh Government using Yutong E12 electric vehicles leased from them.

First Cymru branding was previously used across the network. However, local 'Swansea and the Bay', 'Western Welsh', 'Neath & Port Talbot' and 'Bridgend and County' branding began to be applied to services in its sub-areas. All future repaints will now however be in the national blue and silver First Bus livery.

=== Swansea University services ===
First Cymru has provided dedicated services for students of Swansea University for a number of years. The original service, known as 'Bright Orange Bus', linked Hendrefoilan Student Village to Singleton Campus and the City Centre. The service was expanded to the Bay Campus when it opened in 2015 and renamed 'Campus to Campus'. A new route was also introduced between the two campuses via Sketty, Uplands and Swansea railway station. The network was redesigned and rebranded 'Unibws' following the closure of Hendrefoilan Student Village in the summer of 2023. Newly numbered services 89-92 link the two campuses with the city centre, Sketty, Uplands and new student accommodation in the Parc Tawe, railway station and Morfa Road areas. Night buses N91 and N92 operate until around 4am in the term time.

=== Park and Ride ===
First Cymru operates park & ride sites, which are located at Fabian Way and Landore in Swansea.

=== Swansea Metro ===
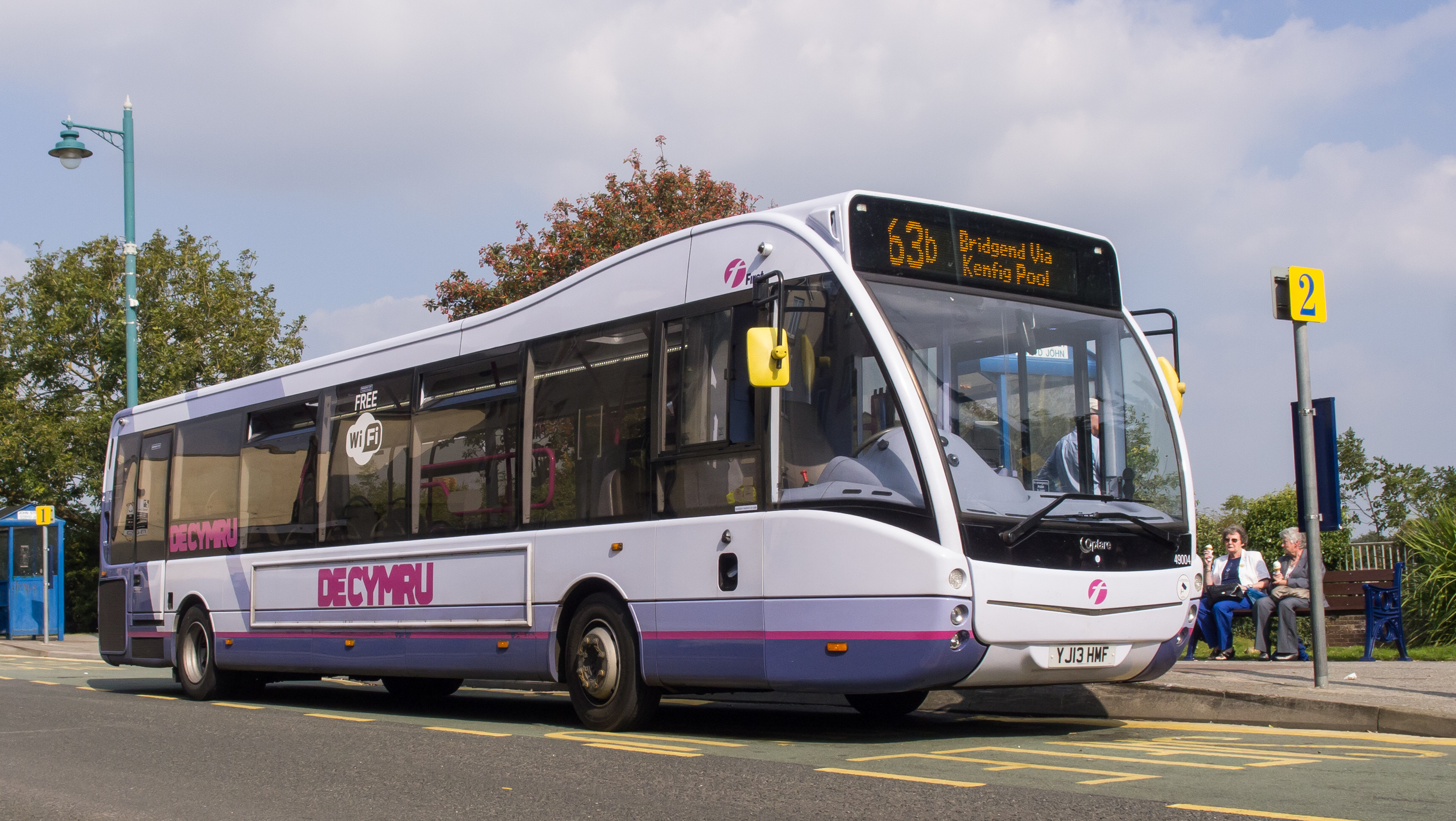
Optare Versa 49004 in Porthcawl in May 2017

First Cymru operate a bus rapid transport route (Service 4) between Singleton Hospital, Swansea University, Swansea City Centre and Morriston Hospital, which was known as the FTRmetro. Ten Wright StreetCar articulated buses were purchased especially for the services, and the road layout around Swansea City Centre was substantially changed to accommodate and prioritise these vehicles. Customer hosts where employed to sell tickets in lieu of the drivers who were in enclosed cabs. On 28 August 2015 the Wright StreetCars were replaced by Wright StreetLite buses and in red metro branding. The customer hosts were scrapped and drivers returned to processing tickets. Much of the dedicated bus lanes for this scheme have now been removed from Swansea City Centre and the service is now predominantly operated by unbranded double deckers.

=== TrawsCymru ===
First Cymru have held the contract for the T1 service between Carmarthen and Aberystwyth since 2014, when Arriva Buses Wales pulled out of Mid Wales. In 2023, First began operating Welsh Government owned Yutong E12 electric vehicles on this service from a bespoke depot in Carmarthen.

=== Tenby Coaster ===
In 2022, First Cymru launched the open-top Tenby Coaster from Tenby to Saundersfoot, which operates from May to September. It is currently operated by converted former First Bradford and First Eastern Counties Volvo B7TL / Wright Eclipse Geminis. There is also a morning extension from Haverfordwest via Oakwood Theme Parkwhich has now closed down in late 2025 and Carew and an evening return, due to the location of the depot in Haverfordwest.

== Previous services ==
=== Cymru Coaster ===
In May 2021, First Cymru launched two new open top bus routes in Swansea and Porthcawl:

- 1 Swansea (Bus Station) to Bracelet Bay via Mumbles
- 99 Trecco Bay to Rest Bay via Porthcawl Town Centre

A further two open-top coaster services were launched in June 2022:

- Aberavon Coaster Port Talbot Bus Station to Aberavon Seafront
- Tenby Coaster Tenby to Saundersfoot

Tenby Coaster is the only remaining open top service.

=== Cymru Clipper ===
In 2014, First Cymru introduced the Cymru Clipper network of longer distance express routes, spanning from Carmarthen & Ammanford to Cardiff.

Services X1, X2, X3, X4, X5, X6, X7, X11 and X13 were encompassed into this network. Dedicated vehicles in blue livery operated these services, with the majority of them offering WiFi and leather seats as standard.

As these services became council tenders in 2024, the Cymru Clipper brand was dropped. Services such as the X11 between Carmarthen and Swansea now observe longer routes and can no longer be considered express routes. Blue Clipper vehicles are still found on the network but are allocated sporadically.

=== Coach services ===
First Cymru used to have its own coaching division and operated school services, National Express contracts and interurban services. Special services were also operated to Abergavenny market and Oakwood Theme Park and Tenby in the summer.

==== Swansea to Cardiff shuttle service ====
First Cymru operated an hourly shuttle service between Cardiff, Bridgend Designer Outlet and Swansea, which was known as the 'Shuttle100'. From 2010 to 15, this service was part of the Greyhound UK network. Following the demise of Greyhound this service was renumbered X10. The service was suspended during the COVID-19 pandemic and has not since been reinstated, marking the end of First Cymru's coaching operations.

==== Greyhound UK ====
In 2010, the Swansea-Cardiff shuttle service became part of the Greyhound UK network and was operated by coaches with leather seats and additional legroom, which could be booked online for the first time. In 2013, the service was extended to Newport, Bristol and Bristol Airport. In March 2015, the Cardiff to Bristol Airport leg of the route was withdrawn and in December 2015 the Greyhound UK brand was dropped. This was the last Greyhound service to operate in the UK. National Express launched its 216 service between Cardiff and Bristol Airport immediately after the withdrawal of the Greyhound service.

==== National Express ====
Until July 2012, when the contract was lost to Edwards Coaches, First Cymru were a National Express contractor and operated services on routes:

- 201 Swansea - Gatwick Airport
- 202 Swansea - Heathrow Airport
- 508 Haverfordwest - London Victoria Coach Station
- 528 Haverfordwest - Rochdale

== Fleet ==
As of October 2024, the First Cymru fleet consisted of 220 buses based from depots in Bridgend, Haverfordwest, Port Talbot, Tycroes, Carmarthen and Swansea. Depots were previously located in Llanelli, Pontardawe, Maesteg and Cardiff.

The main fleet consists of Wright StreetLite, ADL Enviro200, Volvo B9TL / Wright Eclipse Gemini ("1" and 2), Optare Versa and Optare Solo SR vehicles (there is also a small batch of Yutong E12s for TrawsCymru T1 work, and a pair of Volvo B7TL / Wright Eclipse Gemini open-top buses for the Tenby Coaster). In 2024, over 50 Wright StreetLites arrived from First West of England and First Worcester in exchange for much of the company's ADL Enviro200 fleet in response to emissions requirements, making StreetLites the bulk of the fleet. In addition, the company has five former First Aberdeen and First West of England Volvo B7RLE / Wright Eclipse Urban training vehicles in yellow branding targeting potential new recruits.

== See also ==
- Transport in Wales
- List of bus operators of the United Kingdom
- Bus transport in Cardiff
