= Greyhound Motors =

Bus and coach company based in Bristol, England

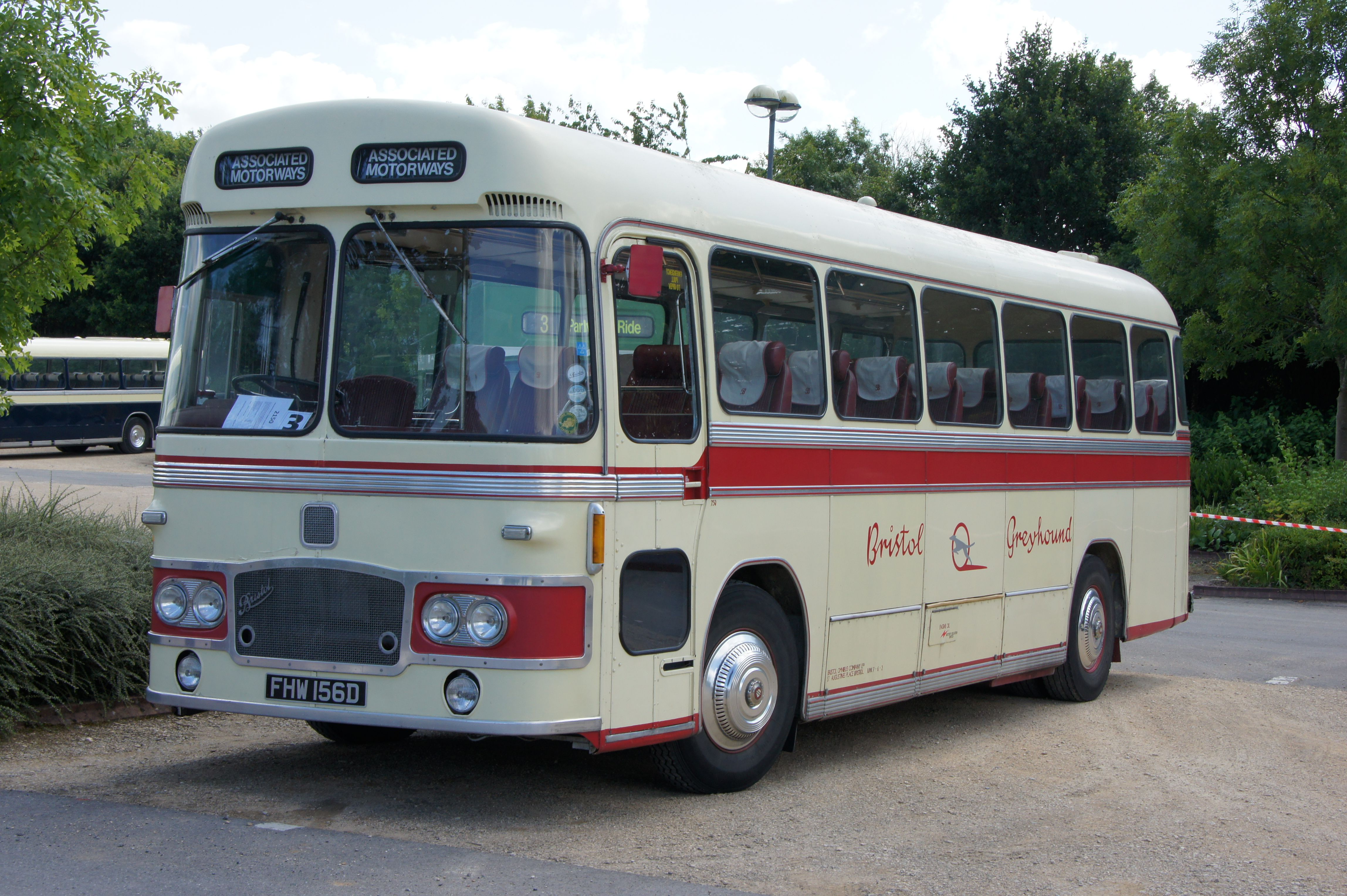
- Preserved Bristol MW6G in Bristol in August 2011
- Parent: Bristol Omnibus Company
- Founded: 1921
- Ceased operation: 1972
- Headquarters: Bristol
- Service area: Bristol; London; Bournemouth; Paignton
- Service type: Bus and long-distance coach operator
- Hubs: Prince Street (until 1958); Bristol bus station (from 1958)

Greyhound Motors, later known as Bristol Greyhound, was an English bus and coach company based in Bristol.

== History ==
Greyhound Motors was formed in February 1921 by Sydney Tom Toogood to operate motor buses in Bristol.

In February 1925, it commenced a long-distance coach service between Bristol and London, which has been claimed to be the first long-distance coach service with scheduled stops en route to pick up and set down passengers. The journey time was eight hours. It later began services from Bristol to Bournemouth and Paignton, and from London to Bournemouth. It also continued to run local bus services in Bristol, competing fiercely with Bristol Tramways.

In 1928, the company was acquired by Bristol Tramways. Greyhound continued to operate as a separate business, including its bus routes in Bristol until 1936. The new owners expanded the Greyhound coach operations. In 1934 it was one of the founder members of the Associated Motorways consortium of long-distance coach operators, but continued the London service outside the consortium.

At the beginning of 1936, the company's business was absorbed into Bristol Tramways. Bristol Omnibus Company continued to use the Greyhound name for its long-distance coach services until 1972, when the National Bus Company required Bristol to adopt the new National Express brand.

Shortly before its demise, on 9 January 1972 Greyhound Motors commenced operating an express Bristol to London service via the new M4 motorway.

== Revival of the name ==
In August 2009, FirstGroup who had owned the former Bristol Omnibus Company since April 1988, announced the reintroduction of the Greyhound brand in the United Kingdom. The new Greyhound UK was a byproduct of FirstGroup purchasing the Greyhound Lines business in the United States in February 2007. Greyhound UK also connected Bristol with Swansea and Bristol Airport until March 2015. This was the last Greyhound service operated.
