= Irizar PB =

Coach

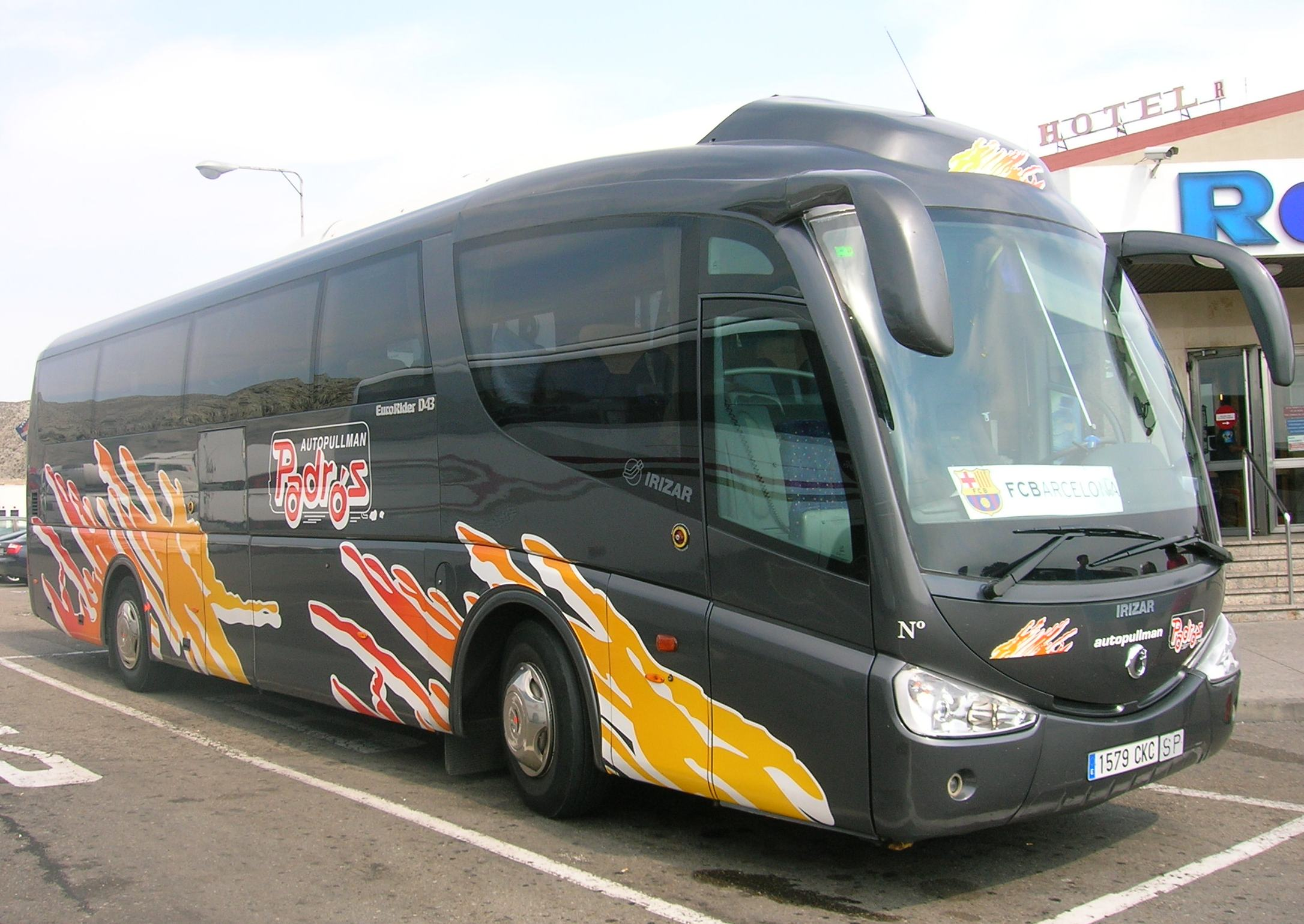
- An Irizar PB-bodied coach.

Overview
- Manufacturer: Irizar

Body and chassis
- Doors: 1
- Floor type: step entrance
- Chassis: MAN 18.400HOCL; Scania K114EB/K124EB; Iveco 397E.12 Eurorider E38; Volvo B12B; Mercedes-Benz O-500 RSD (in Brazil)

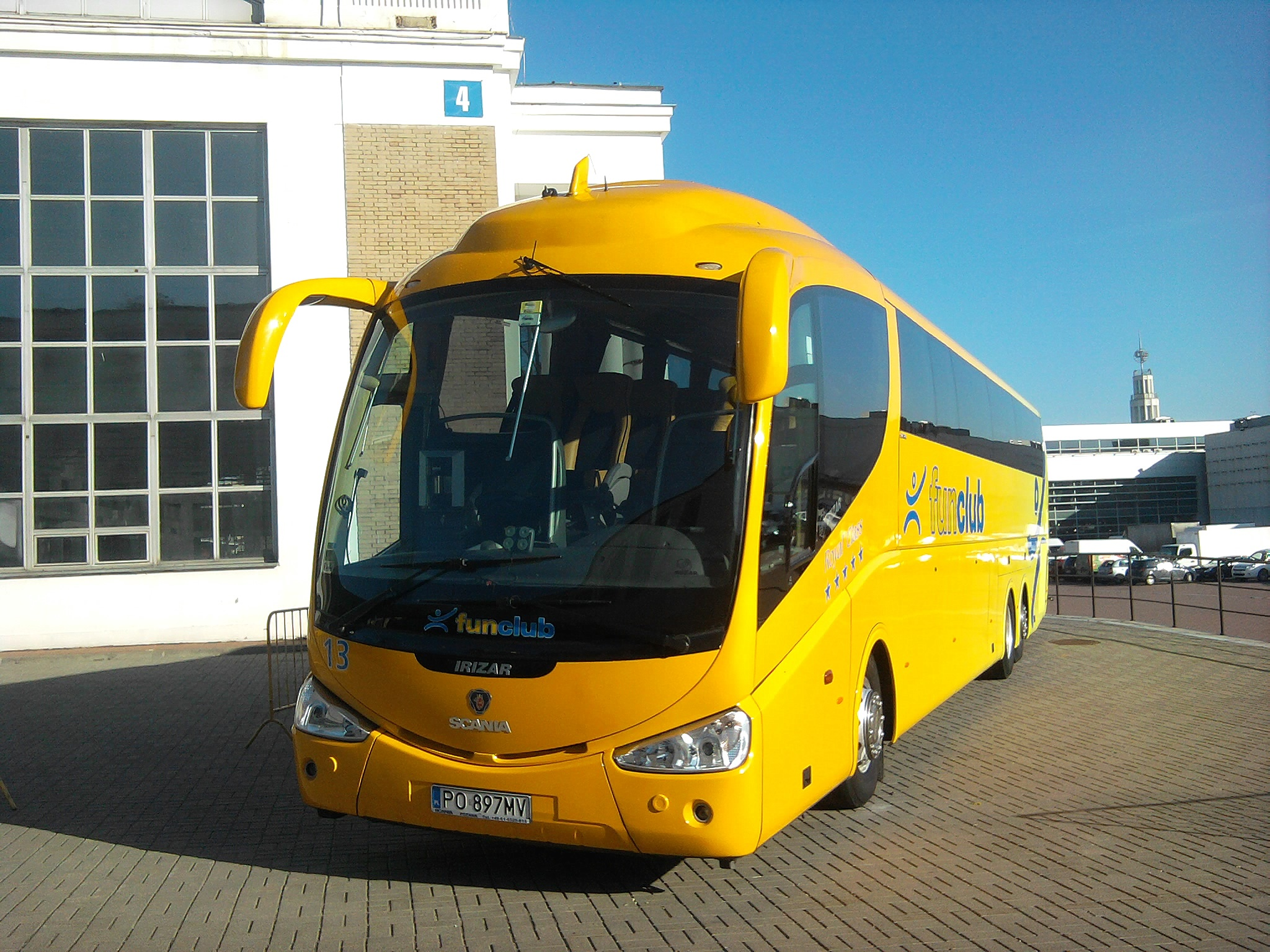
Scania Irizar PB 6x2 on Poznań International Fair.

The Irizar PB is a coach body manufactured by the Irizar Group from 2001 to 2015. It was built upon of the wide range of chassis. It was designed by Arup Design Research in the UK. Its revolutionary styling and features led to the variant with a Scania chassis being named European Coach of the Year 2004.

The PB body is available in 13 different combinations, each suited to particular chassis. Lengths range from 12 m to 15 m for tri-axle variants. The body is available in two heights: 3.5 m and 3.7 m.

Subsequently, the PB which being replaced by the Irizar i8 and the Irizar i6.

== Chassis ==
Known chassis which the Irizar PB body has been built upon:

- MAN 18.xxx HOCL/24.xxx HOCLN
- Scania K114EB/K124EB/K114IB
- Scania K EB
- Iveco EuroRider 397E
- Volvo B12
- Volvo B12B
- Volvo B13R
- Volvo B11R
- Mercedes-Benz OC 500 RF (Spain)
- Mercedes-Benz O 500 series (in Brazil)
- Volksbus 18.330 OT (in Latin America)
