= Volvo 9900 =

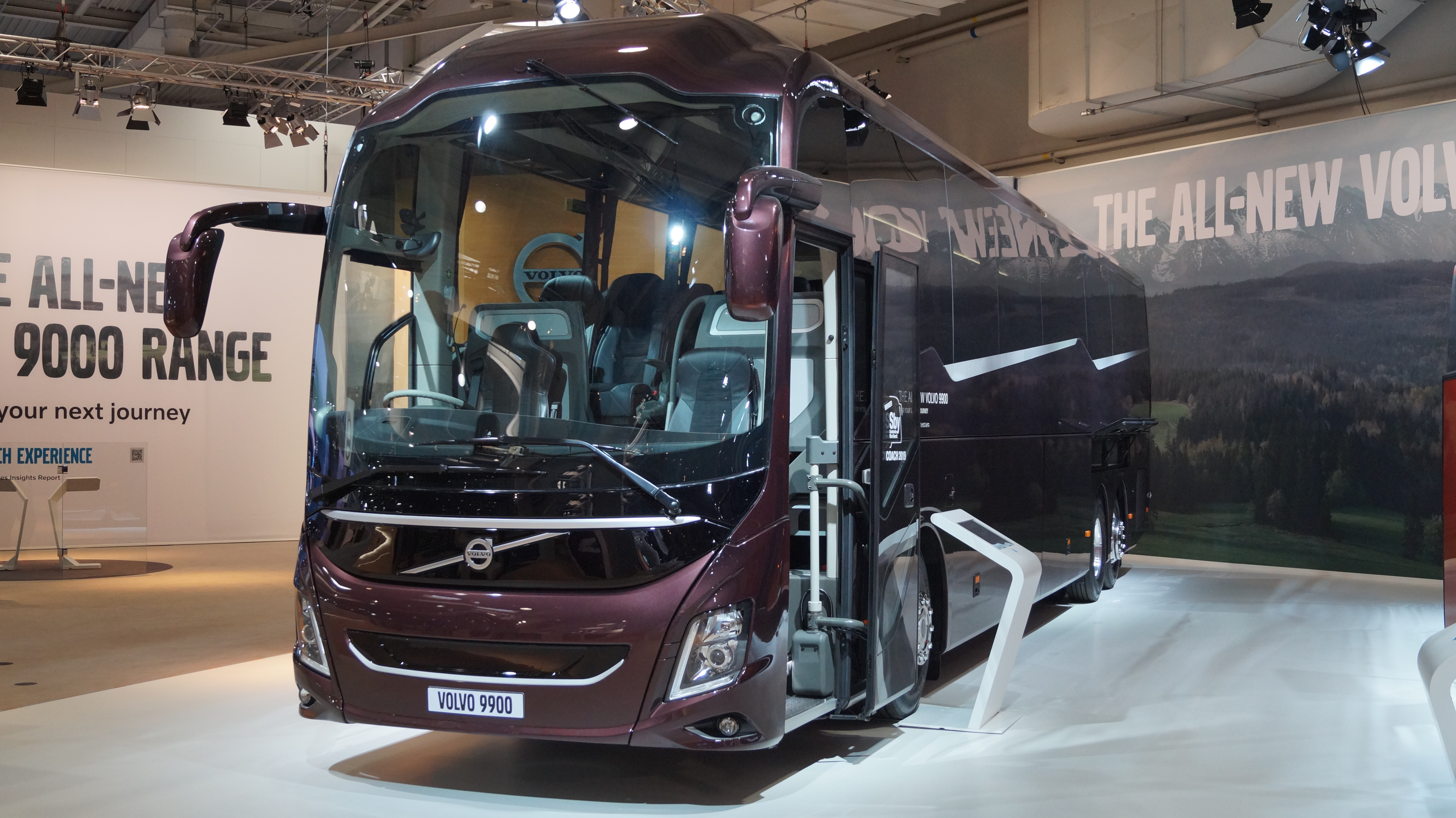
- Fourth-generation Volvo 9900

Overview
- Type: Coach (bus)
- Manufacturer: Volvo
- Production: 2001–2005; 2007–present
- Assembly: Germany: Heilbronn (Drögmöller); Poland: Wrocław

Body and chassis
- Class: Commercial vehicle
- Doors: 2 (1-1-0)
- Floor type: Step entrance
- Chassis: Volvo B12B, B13R, B11R

Dimensions
- Length: 12.3 m, 13.0 m, 13.8 m
- Width: 2.55 m
- Height: 3.73 m

Chronology
- Predecessor: Volvo B12-600

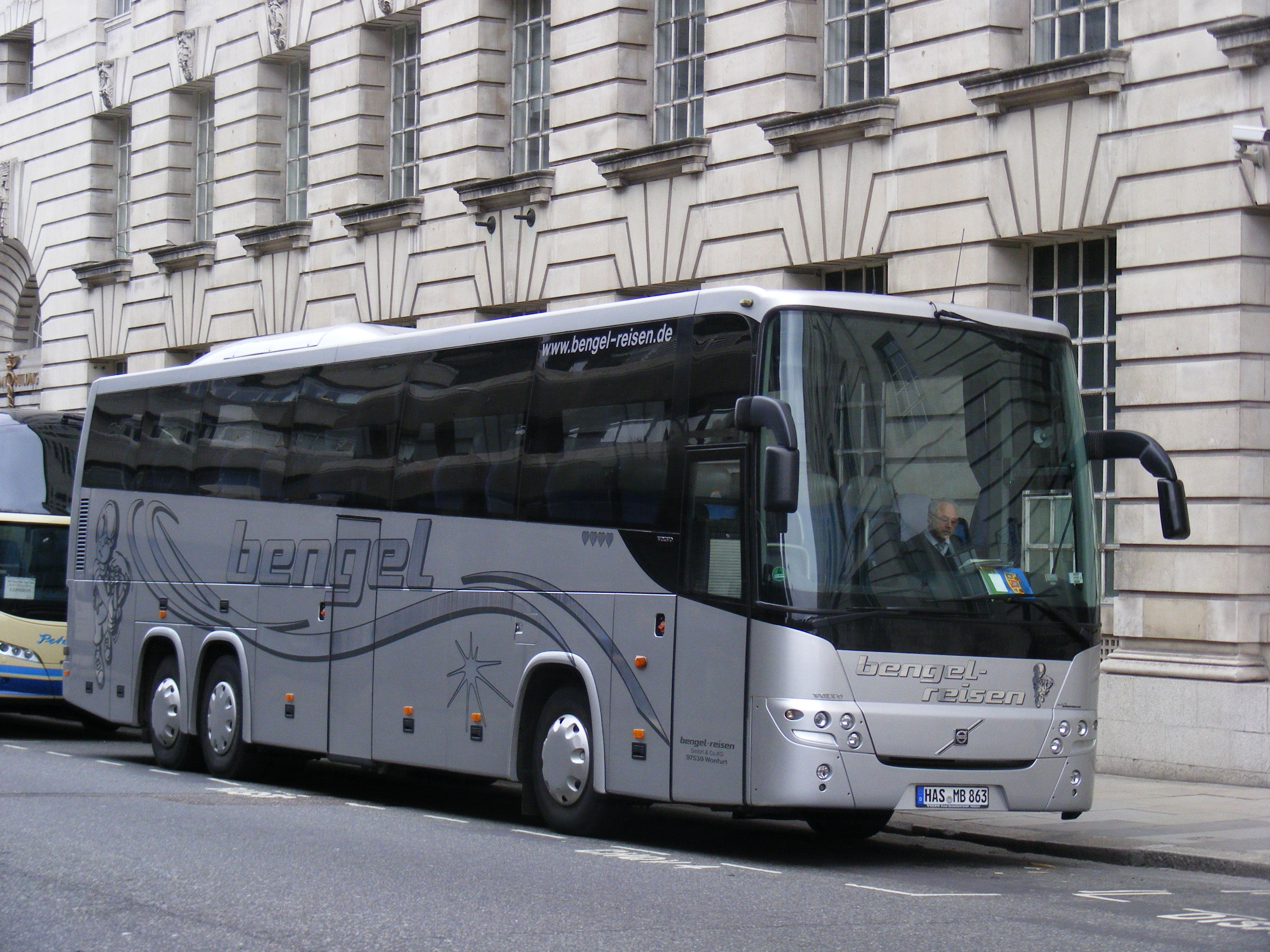
Drögmöller-built Volvo 9900 from Germany.

The Volvo 9900 is a coach manufactured by Volvo, best known for its theatrical floor. The first generation was built by Drögmöller (Volvo Busse Deutschland GmbH) in Heilbronn, Germany, between 2001 and 2005. The second generation was introduced in 2007 as a member of the Volvo 9700 family and has since then been built at Volvo Polska Sp. z o.o. in Wrocław, Poland. The third generation was introduced in 2013.

== History ==
The 9900 was launched as a replacement for the Volvo B12-600, and the first coach from Drögmöller built to full Volvo specifications on the Volvo TX platform. The main concept of the 9900 is that of the old Drögmöller E330 Comet model, with theatre seating and a window line that slopes slightly upwards towards the rear of the vehicle. While the B12-600 was only available as a standard two-axle 12.0 m, the 9900 came also as tri-axle 12.8 m and 13.7 m. The Comet had been available in tri-axle configuration as the Drögmöller E430 SuperComet in the early 1990s. The 9900s from Drögmöller were solely built on Volvo B12B chassis.

In 2005, Volvo closed down the Heilbronn plant, which also meant that the 9900 was out of production. Volvo wanted to relocate the production of the model, but not until it they had their new generation of 9700 ready.

In 2007 the model was relaunched as part of the Volvo 9700 family, being built at the plant in Poland. The styling became identical to that of the second generation 9700s, except of course for the sloping window line. It seems it became a bit too identical, because one year later, in early 2008 came a little facelift to some of the exterior details. Among the most visible were the lower part of the front and the air intakes. In 2010, the B12B chassis was replaced by the new B13R chassis. Volvo emphasized the model even further in 2011, when a silver stripe along the lower window line was added. This was perhaps because it has over the years been popular among some operators to paint their 9700s like if they were 9900s.

In 2013, the third generation 9900 with the same new styling details as the third generation 9700s. It was displayed at the Busworld Kortrijk fair in October 2013. Also, the B13R chassis had to give way for the Euro VI compliant B11R.

The fourth generation 9900 was unveiled in May 2018, alongside its sibling the 9700. It is similar to the 9800, and is built exclusively for the European market in Poland.
