= Volvo B12 =

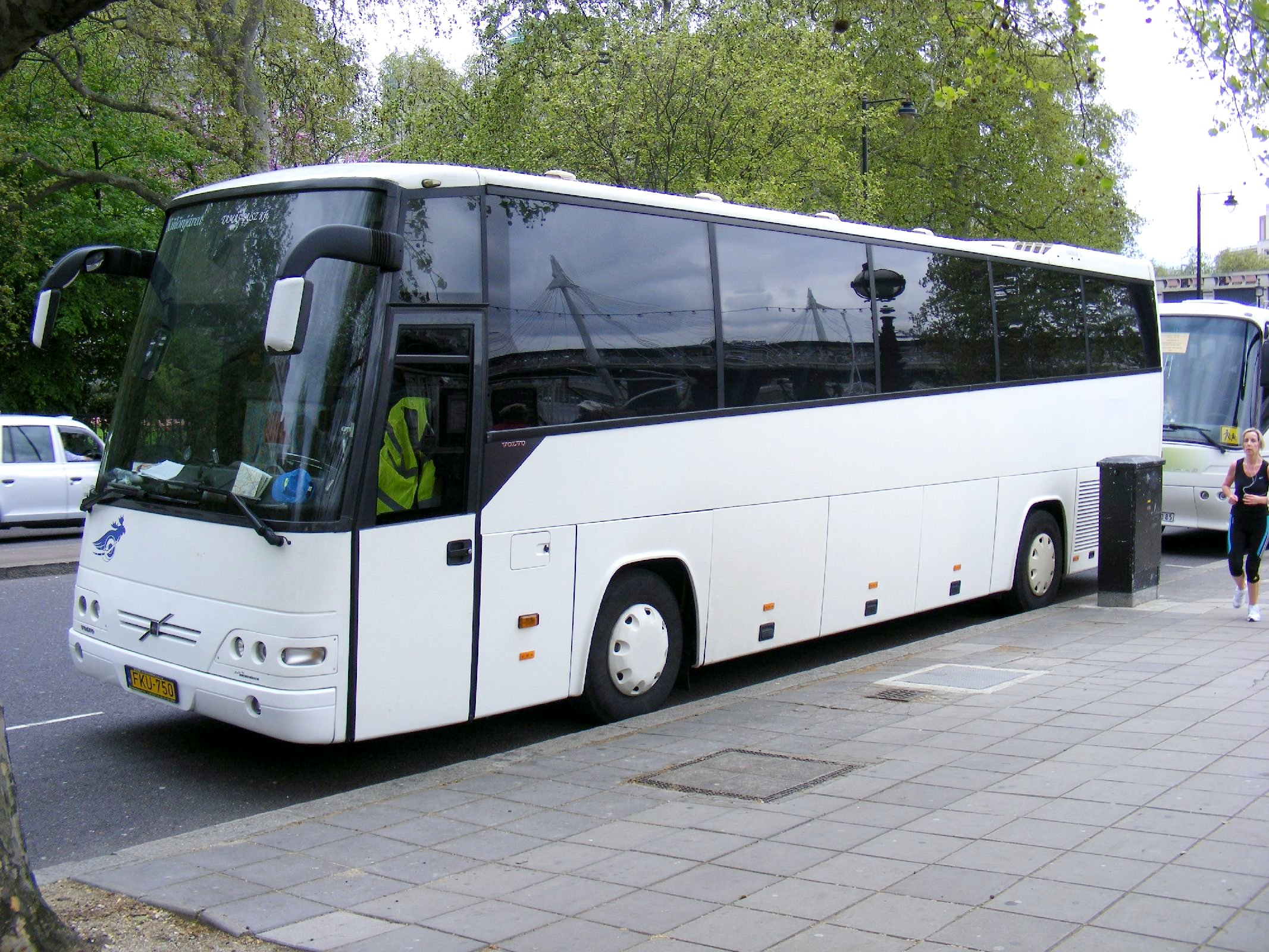
- Drögmöller-bodied Volvo B12-600 in Hungary.

Overview
- Manufacturer: Volvo
- Production: 1991-2001 (-2011)
- Assembly: Sweden; Brazil

Body and chassis
- Class: Coach chassis
- Floor type: Step entrance

Powertrain
- Engine: 12.0/12.1-litre rear-mounted I-6; Volvo TD122, TD123, D12A; Brazil: TD122, D12D

Chronology
- Successor: Volvo B12B; Volvo B11R (Brazil)

The Volvo B12, also known as the Volvo B12R, was a rear-engined heavy-duty coach chassis manufactured by Volvo in Sweden between 1991 and 2001, and in Brazil between 1997 and 2011.

== History ==
The B12 was Volvo's first large coach chassis with a vertically mounted engine, which limited the available body models that would fit. It was first fitted with the 12.0-litre TD122/TD123, which in 1995 was replaced by the 12.1-litre D12A. Because of the engine height it was probably less popular than the lower B10B, but it was Volvo's only rear-engined coach chassis that was offered as a tri-axle. The only other option for a tri-axle coach was the mid-engined B10M, and not all customers wanted to have the engine "where the luggage was supposed to be". It was succeeded in 2001 by the B12B, which had the same engine but in a horizontally mounted version.

Like with the B6 (B6R) and the B6LE (B6RLE), the B12 was marketed as the Volvo B12R in Australia. They were of the standard version built in Sweden, and not related to the far more known B12R built in Brazil between 2003 and 2011.

After Volvo had acquired Drögmöller in 1994, they changed production there from building complete chassis-less coaches to building on Volvo chassis, and the obvious choice was the B12. Out of all the different models Drögmöller had, only two went on to become Volvo models from 1995. The E320 EuroPullman became Volvo B12-500 and the E330H EuroComet became Volvo B12-600. They were only available in standard 12-metre length. Later the B12-600 became the basis for the 9900.

== Volvo B12B and B12R (Brazil) ==
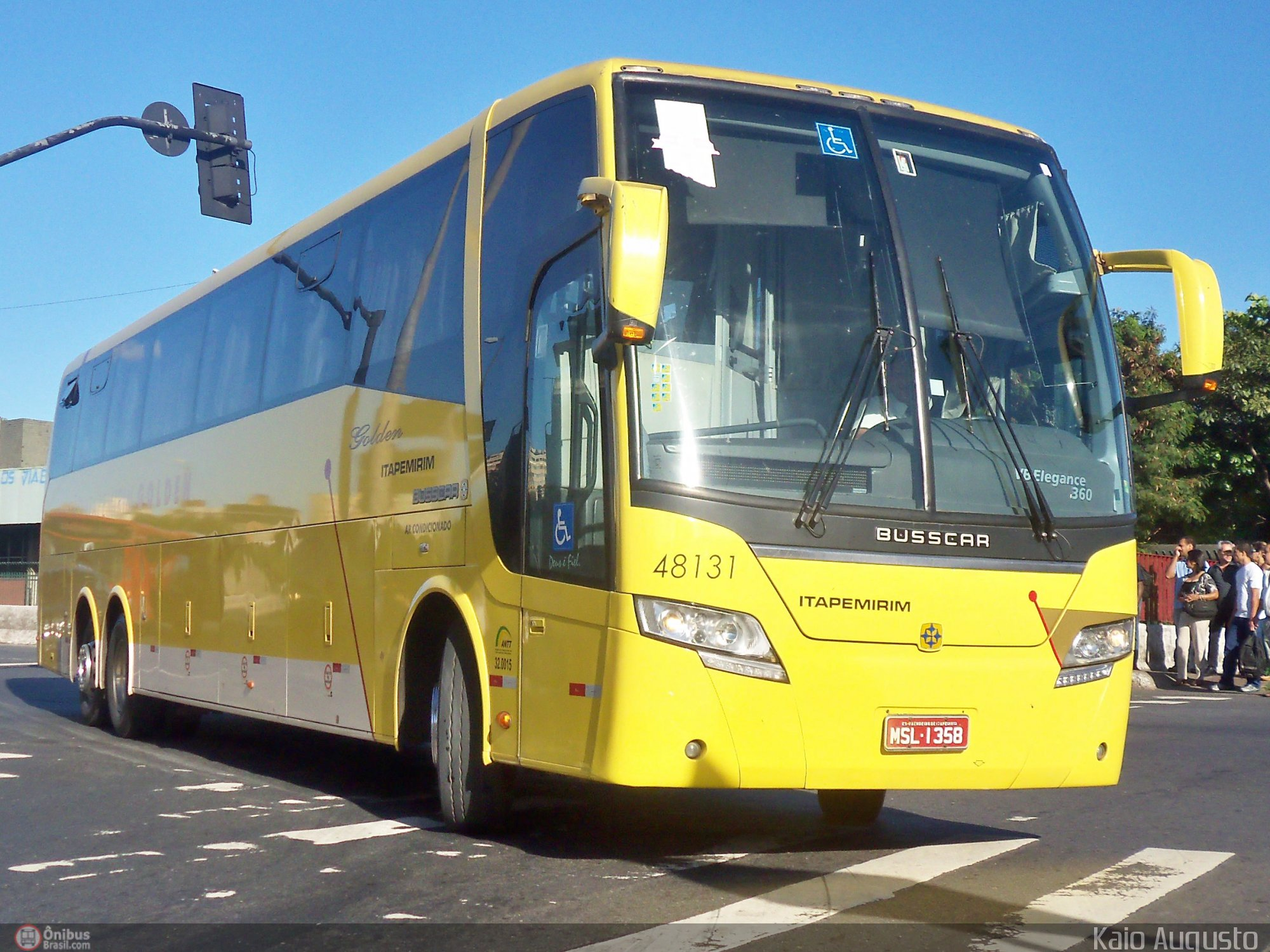
Itapemirim Busscar Vissta Buss Elegance 360-bodied B12R 6x2 in Brazil

The production of the B12 in Sweden ended in 2001 in favour of the B12B, but at Volvo's plant in Curitiba, Brazil, the chassis was also available later. After first being imported from Sweden, the Brazilian-made B12 was launched in 1997 as the B12B, not to be confused with the European B12B launched four years later, and was built until 2001. It was then replaced by the B10R with a vertical engine, also as a tri-axle, between 2000 and 2003. This should again not be confused with the original B10R with a horizontally mounted engine. In 2003 the B12 was relaunched as the B12R with a newer version of the 12.1-litre engine. In 2010 it was launched in a quad-axle version for the largest double-deckers. The production ended in 2011, with the B11R taking over in 2012 under the names of B380R, B420R and B450R, depending on the power output.

== Engines ==
=== Sweden ===
TD122, 11 978 cc, in-line 6 cyl. turbodiesel (1991-?)

- TD122FH - 262 kW (356 bhp), 1550 Nm, Euro I
- TD122FL - 291 kW (396 bhp), 1665 Nm

TD123, 11 978 cc, in-line 6 cyl. turbodiesel (1992-1995)

- TD123E - 262 kW (356 bhp), Euro I
- TD123ES - 298 kW (405 bhp), Euro I

D12A, 12 130 cc, in-line 6 cyl. turbodiesel (1995-2001)

- D12A340 - 250 kW (340 bhp), Euro II
- D12A380 - 279 kW (380 bhp), Euro II
- D12A420 - 309 kW (420 bhp), Euro II

=== Brazil ===
TD122, 11 978 cc, in-line 6 cyl. turbodiesel (1996-2001)

- TD122FH - 262 kW (356 bhp), 1550 Nm
- TD122FL - 291 kW (396 bhp), 1665 Nm

D12D, 12 130 cc, in-line 6 cyl. turbodiesel (2003-2011)

- D12D340 - 250 kW (340 bhp)
- D12D380 - 279 kW (380 bhp)
- D12D420 - 309 kW (420 bhp)
