= Drögmöller =

German bus and coach manufacturer

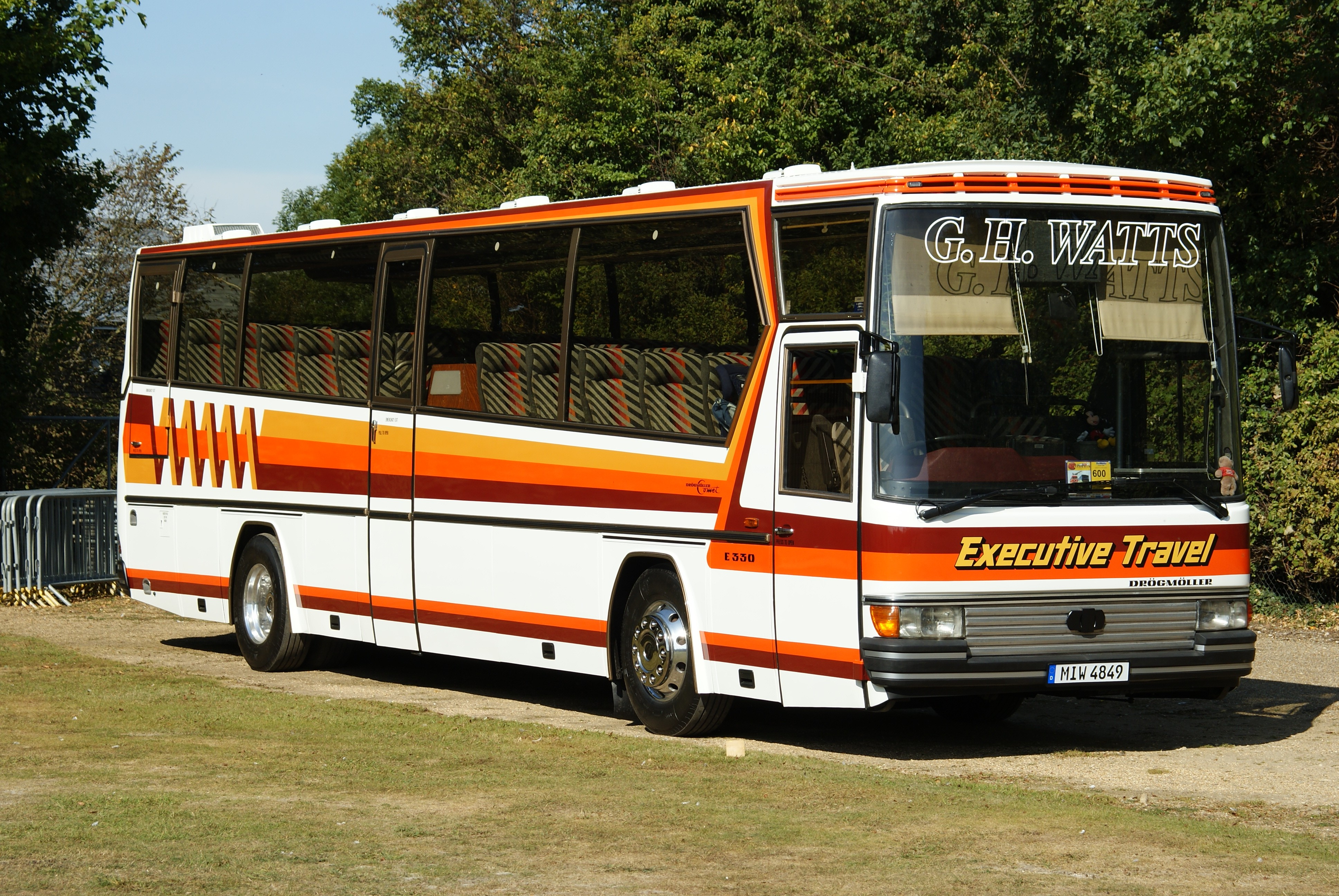
Drögmöller E330 Comet

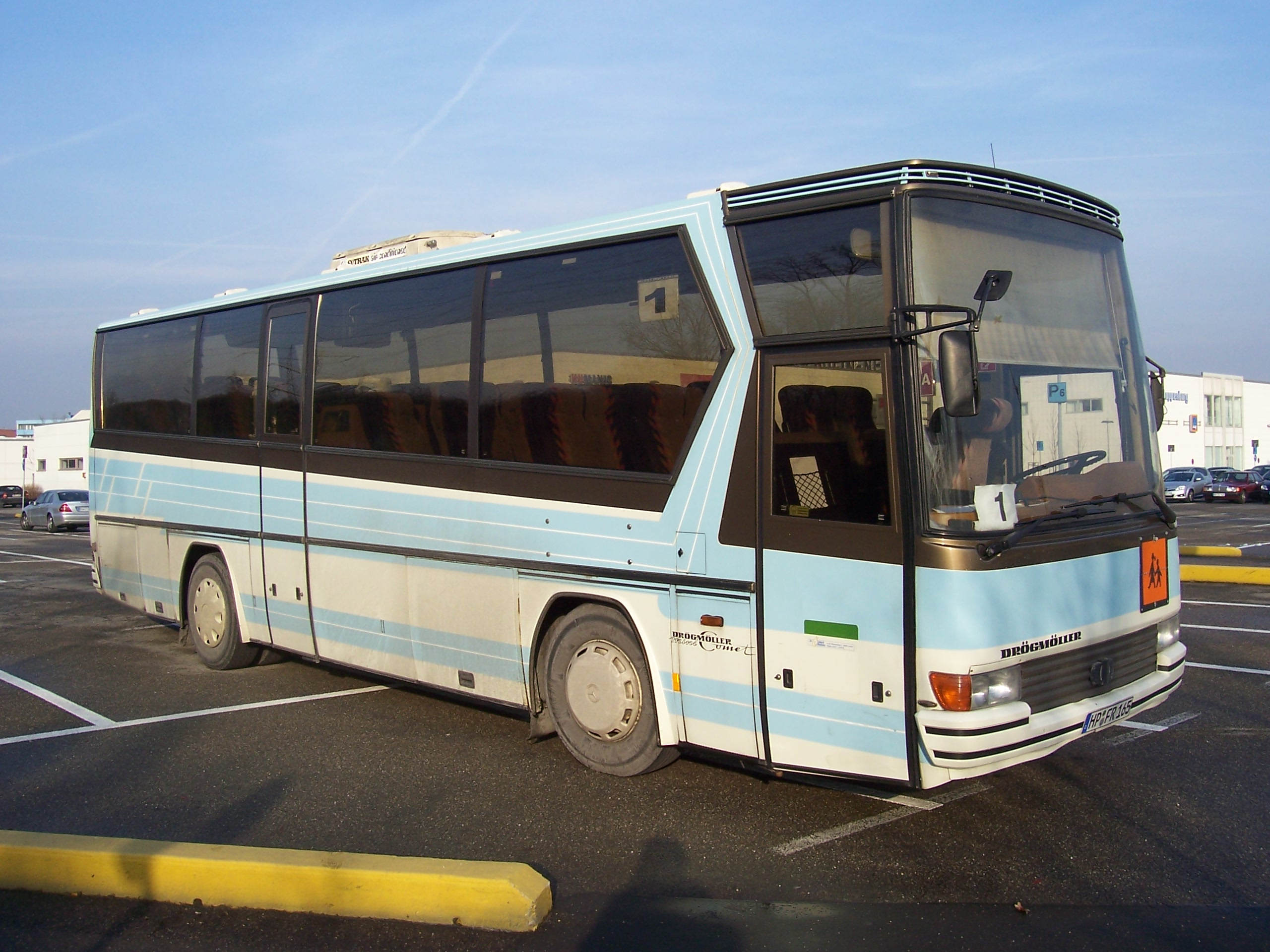
Drögmöller E330K miniComet

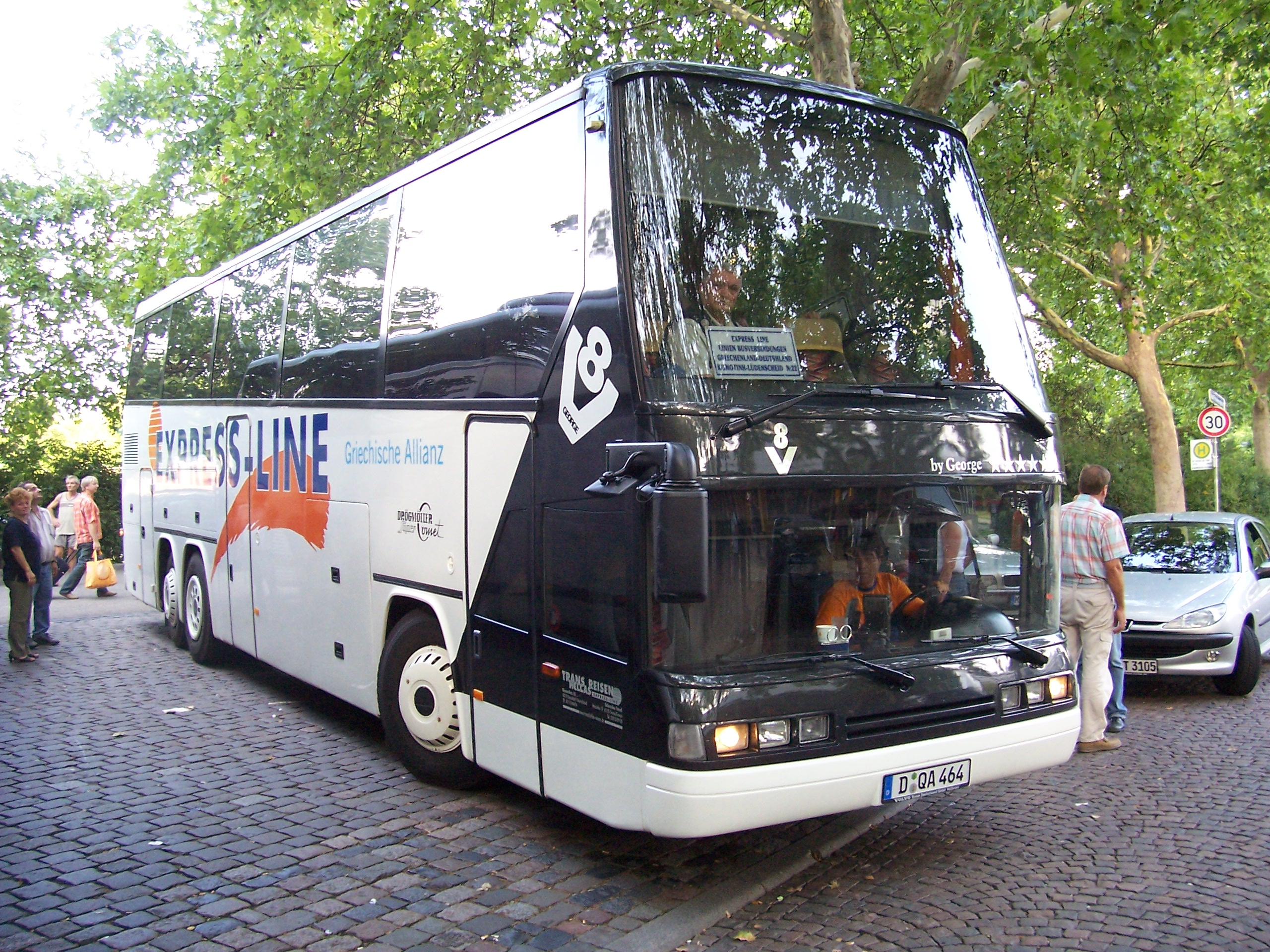
Drögmöller E430U SuperComet

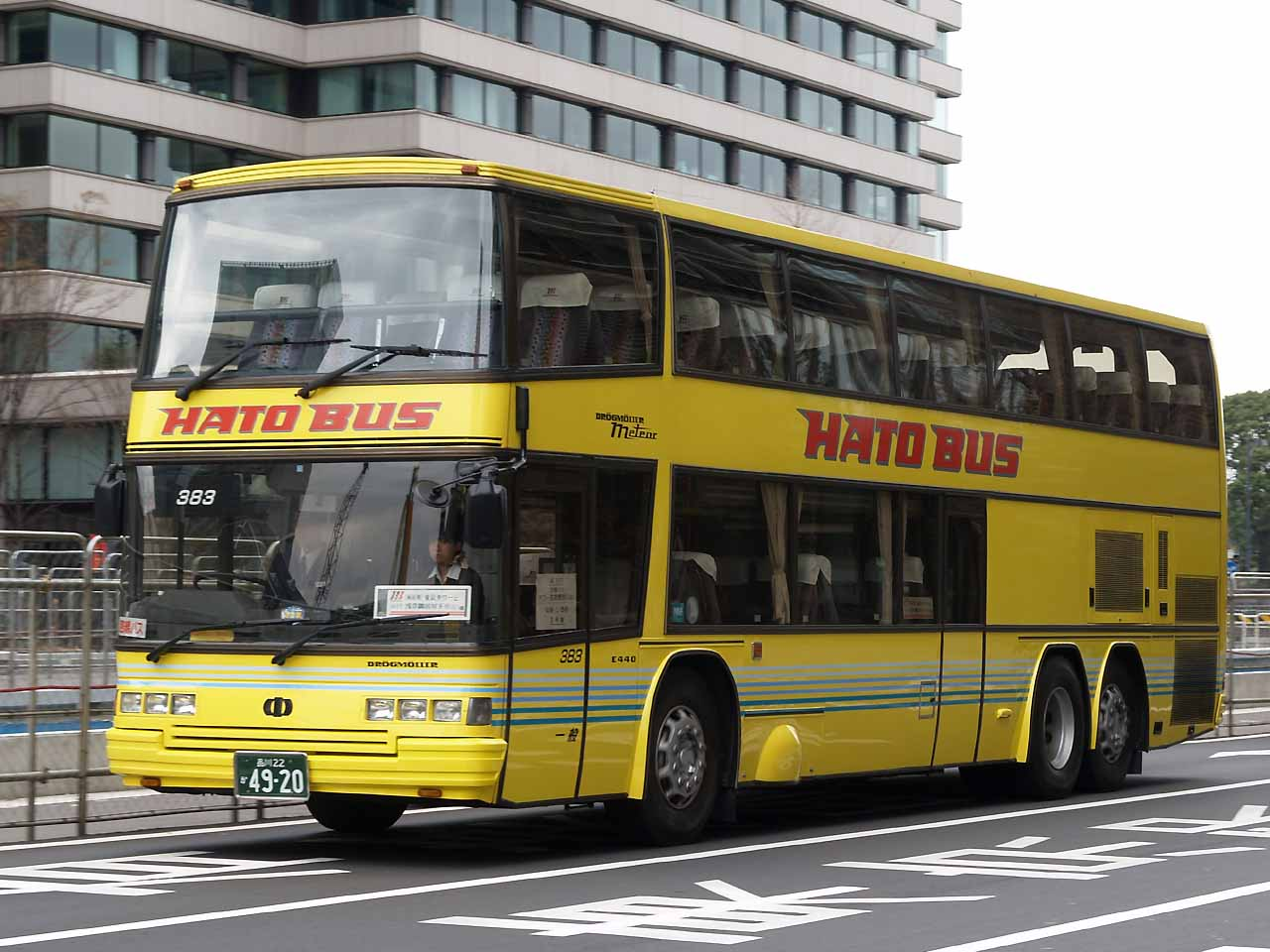
Drögmöller E440 Meteor in Japan

Drögmöller (Drögmöller-Karosserien GmbH & Co. KG) was a motor coach manufacturer based in Heilbronn, Germany. The company operated between 1920 and 2005 and was known for the production of touring coaches.

== History ==
The business was founded 1 July 1920 by Gotthard Drögmöller from Mecklenburg. Originally the Drögmöllers were built on a Mercedes-Benz chassis, but in 1965 the firm started to build complete vehicles, following the pattern established more than a decade earlier by Ulm-based Setra. Drögmöller gained market exposure by producing touring coaches with so called theatre or panorama seating: these vehicles featured an interior floor that incorporated a slight downward slope from the back to the front of the vehicle, which improved forward vision for passengers. Volumes remained modest, however: during the 1980s the firm was producing around 90 vehicles per year with a workforce of approximately 320.

In the 1990s the lucrative German market for touring coaches was dominated by Mercedes-Benz, Setra and Neoplan, and it was presumably in the hope of gaining a more significant share of the German market that in 1994 Volvo took a stake in Drögmöller: in 1995 they acquired the business outright. In 2001 a new model with Drögmöller-style theatre seating, the Volvo 9900, was introduced: nevertheless, the closure of the plant in 2005 suggests that Volvo's ambitions for their acquisition were not fully realised. The Heilbronn plant remained Volvo's German headquarters for buses until 2010, when the administration moved to Ismaning near Munich and the used buses department to Lohfelden near Kassel.

== Drögmöller coaches ==
Pullman series

- E280
- E290 SuperPullman
- E310 SuperPullman
- E320 EuroPullman

Comet series

- E330 Comet
- E330H EuroComet
- E330K MiniComet
- E430 SuperComet
- E430U SuperComet

Double-deckers

- E420 Corsair
- E440 Meteor
- Mercedes-Benz O404DD — A one-off prototype built for Daimler in 1992.

== Volvo Busse Deutschland coaches ==
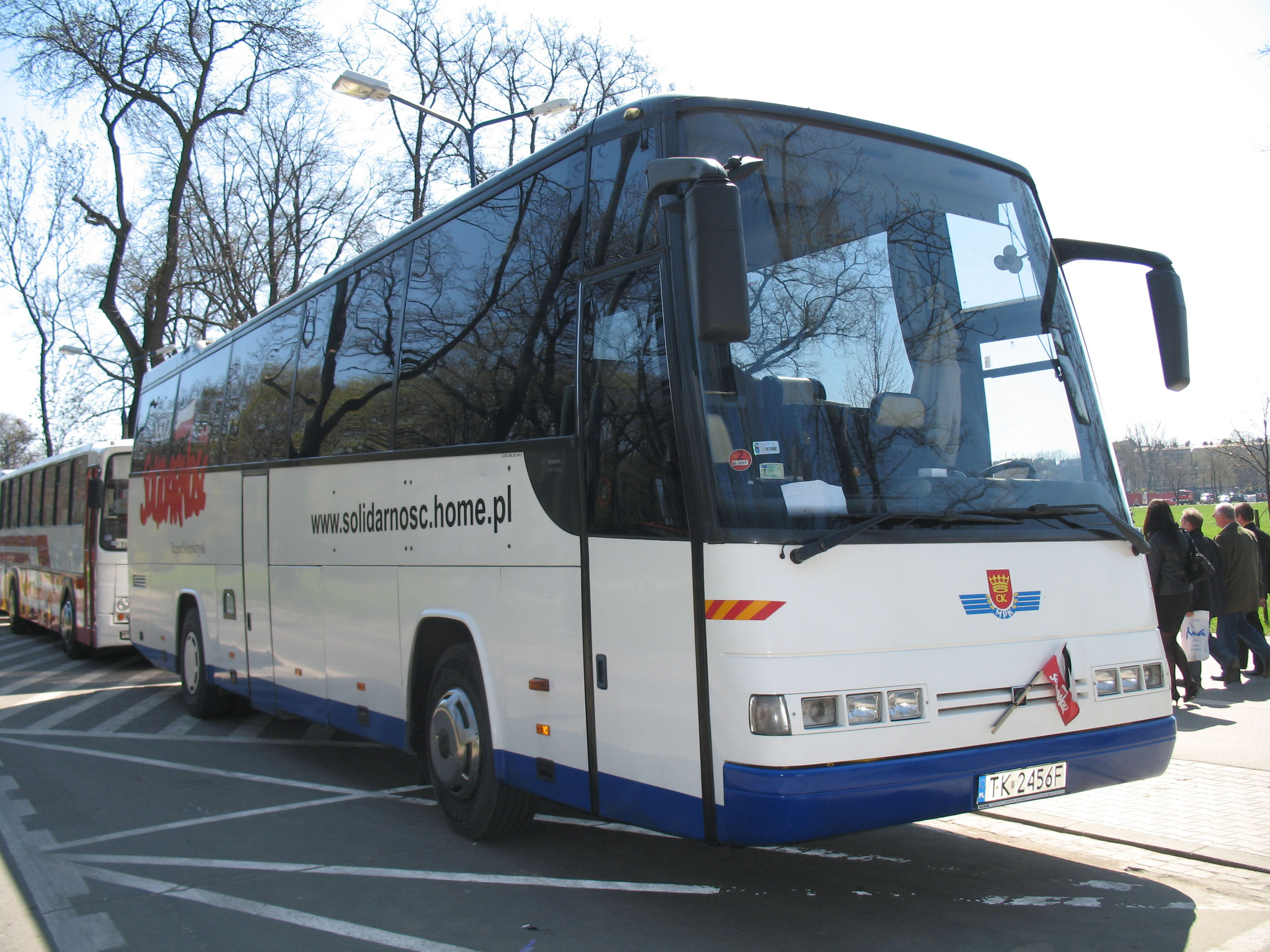
Volvo B12-600

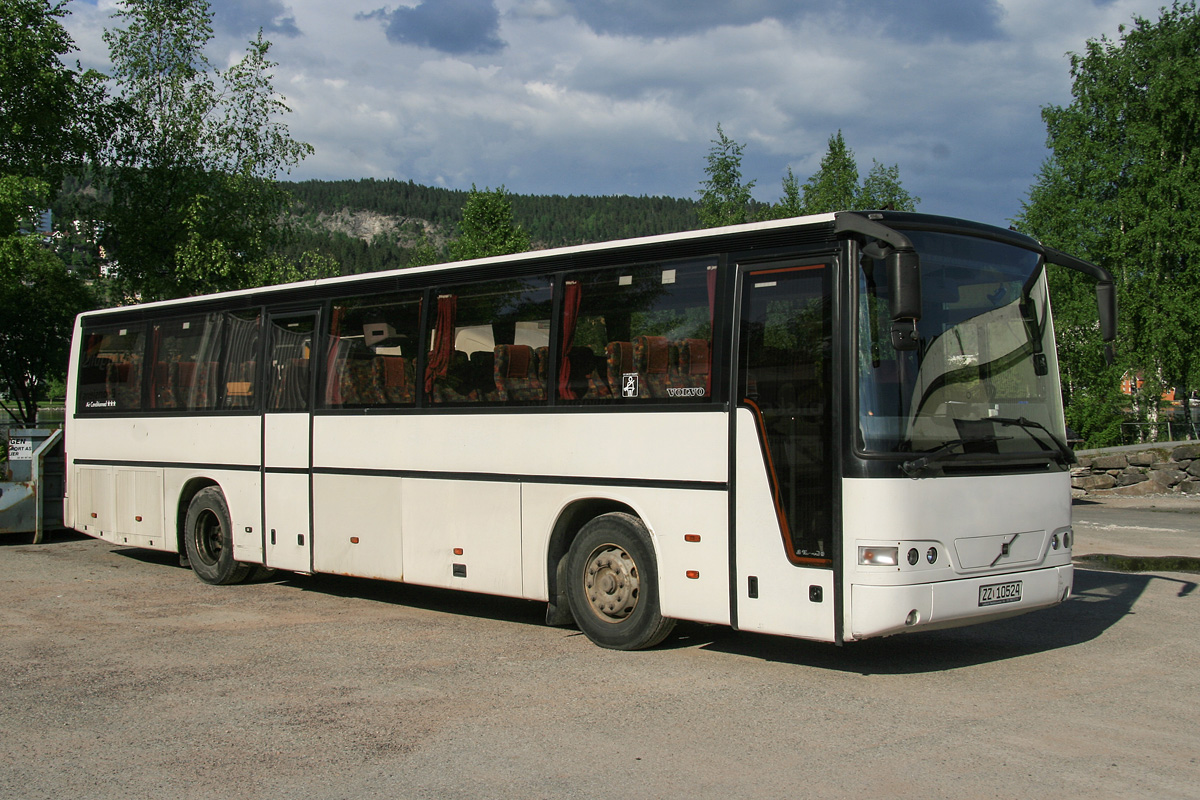
Volvo B10-400

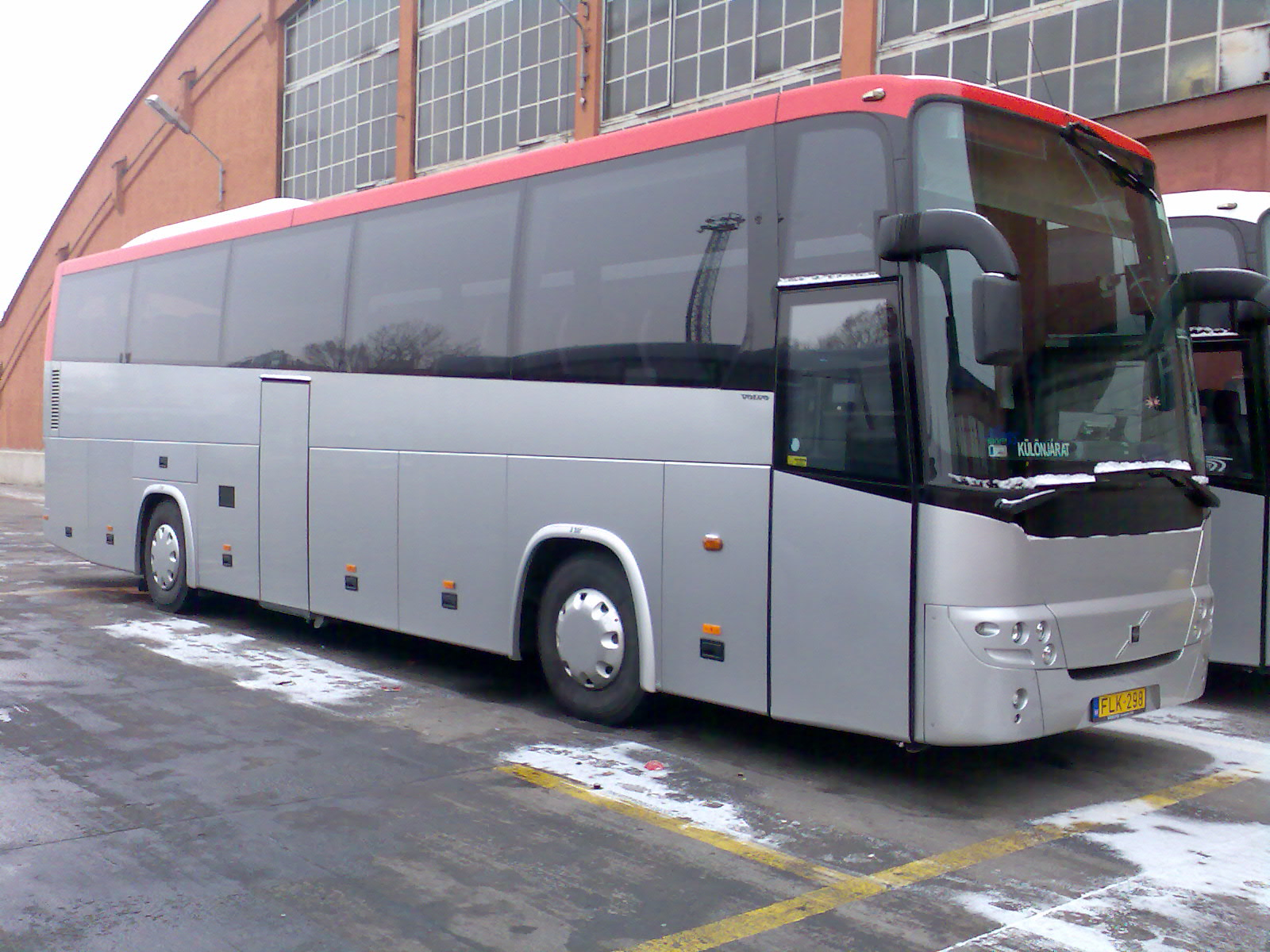
Volvo 9900

=== Volvo B12-500 ===
Even before the Volvo takeover, they had started a partnership with Drögmöller for new coaches. Starting the development in 1992, the first new coach was the Volvo B12-500, inheriting the characteristics of the E320 EuroPullman, with the backward leaning windscreen from the recent Comets. The B12 part of the name coming from the Volvo B12 chassis that it was built on. It was joined by the Volvo B12-500H, which was a little taller. Quite similar-looking, the easiest way to tell them apart is the middle door touching the side windows on the B12-500, while there is a little gap on the B12-500H. Also over the front door there is a window on the B12-500H, while there isn't on the B12-500. For 1999 the B12-500H received a facelift replacing the old rectangular row of headlights with new round ones, looking quite similar to those on the B10-400. It is unknown how long the B12-500 stayed in production, but it seem not to have reached the facelift.

=== Volvo B12-600 ===
The second new Volvo coach was the Volvo B12-600 in 1995, a successor to the E330H EuroComet, it too being built on the B12 chassis. Unlike its predecessors, it was only available as a 12-metre two-axle coach, but with the well known theatre seating, it still sold well. Like with the B12-500H, it received a facelift for 1999.

=== Volvo B10-400 ===
Drögmöller didn't only produce pure touring coaches. In 1997 they introduced the Volvo B10-400, an intercity bus based on the Carrus Vega developed in Finland. As the name suggests, it was not built on the B12, but on the B10B and B10M chassis. The B10-400 was available in at least three different versions: B10-400 K/860, B10-400 K/1040 and B10-400 M/NFH. The K/860 and the K/1040 were based on the B10B and the numbers represent their floor height in millimetres. The K/860 had double middle door (1-2-0), while the K/1040 only had a single middle door (1-1-0). The M/NFH was based on the B10M and had a low-floor bay at the rear end, with a double rear door and no middle door (1-0-2). There was also a B10B-based B10-400 IC, but except from allowing more standing passengers, little is known about its characteristics. The Vega was also available from Poland under the name Volvo 7250, from 2000 also available on the B7R chassis. It is possible that some buses sold as B10-400 were built in Poland. In 2001, the B10-400 was replaced by the Volvo 8700, built in Poland and Finland.

=== Volvo 9900 ===
The Volvo 9900 launched in 2001 was the successor to the B12-600, now being a model built on the B12B chassis, entirely after Volvo's specifications. It once again became available as a tri-axle like the old E430 SuperComet. The 9900 being the only product manufactured by Drögmöller since 2001, sales were apparently not high enough for continued production in Heilbronn, so Volvo closed down the plant in 2005 and later moved the production to Poland.
