= Bus transport in Berlin =

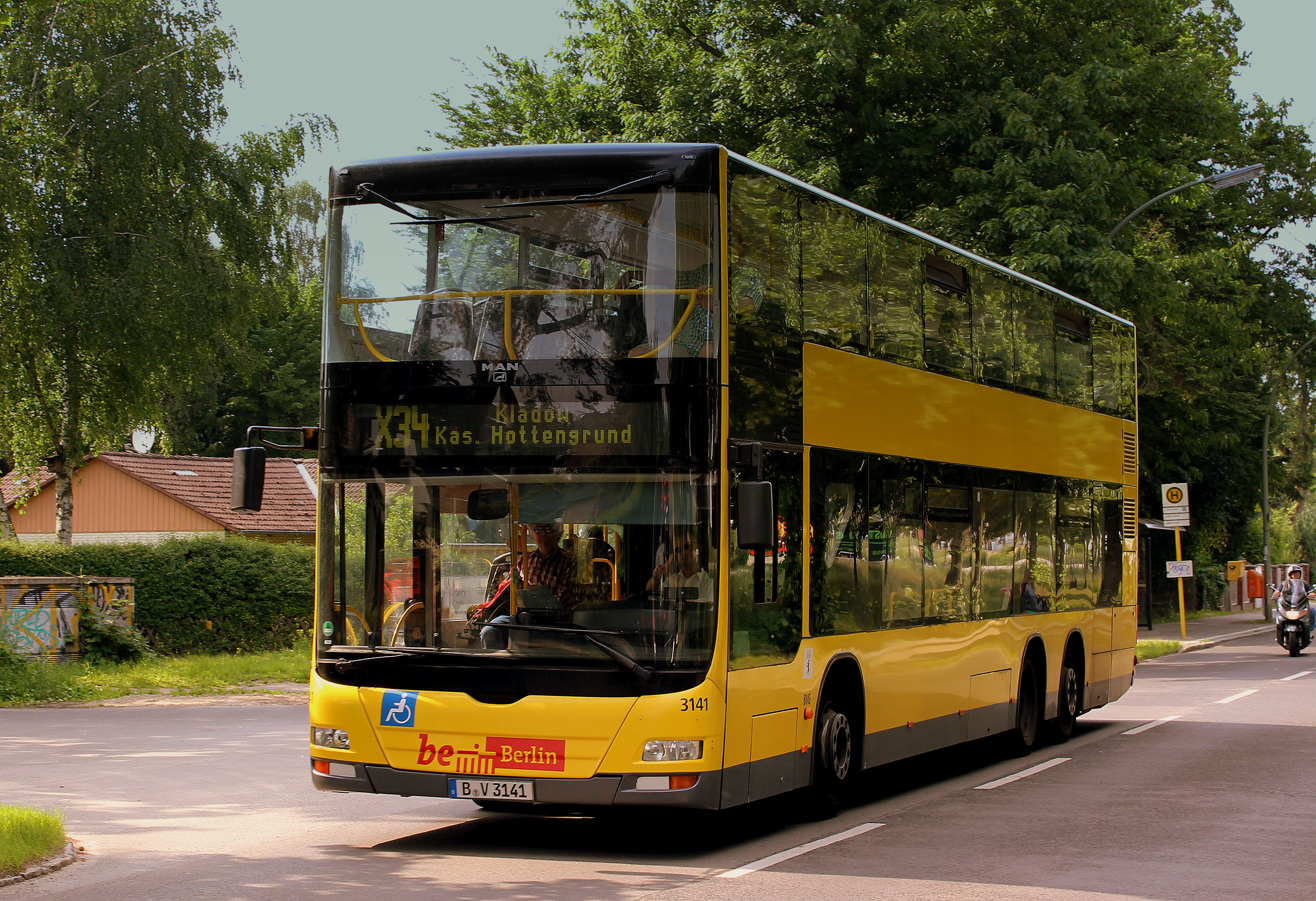
- MAN Lion's City DD double decker bus

Overview
- Locale: Berlin, Germany
- Transit type: Public bus transport
- Number of lines: 152 (+49 night lines)
- Number of stations: 6.589
- Website: https://www.bvg.de/en

Operation
- Began operation: 1846
- Operator: Berliner Verkehrsbetriebe
- Number of vehicles: 1,550

Technical
- System length: 1,798 km (1,117 mi)

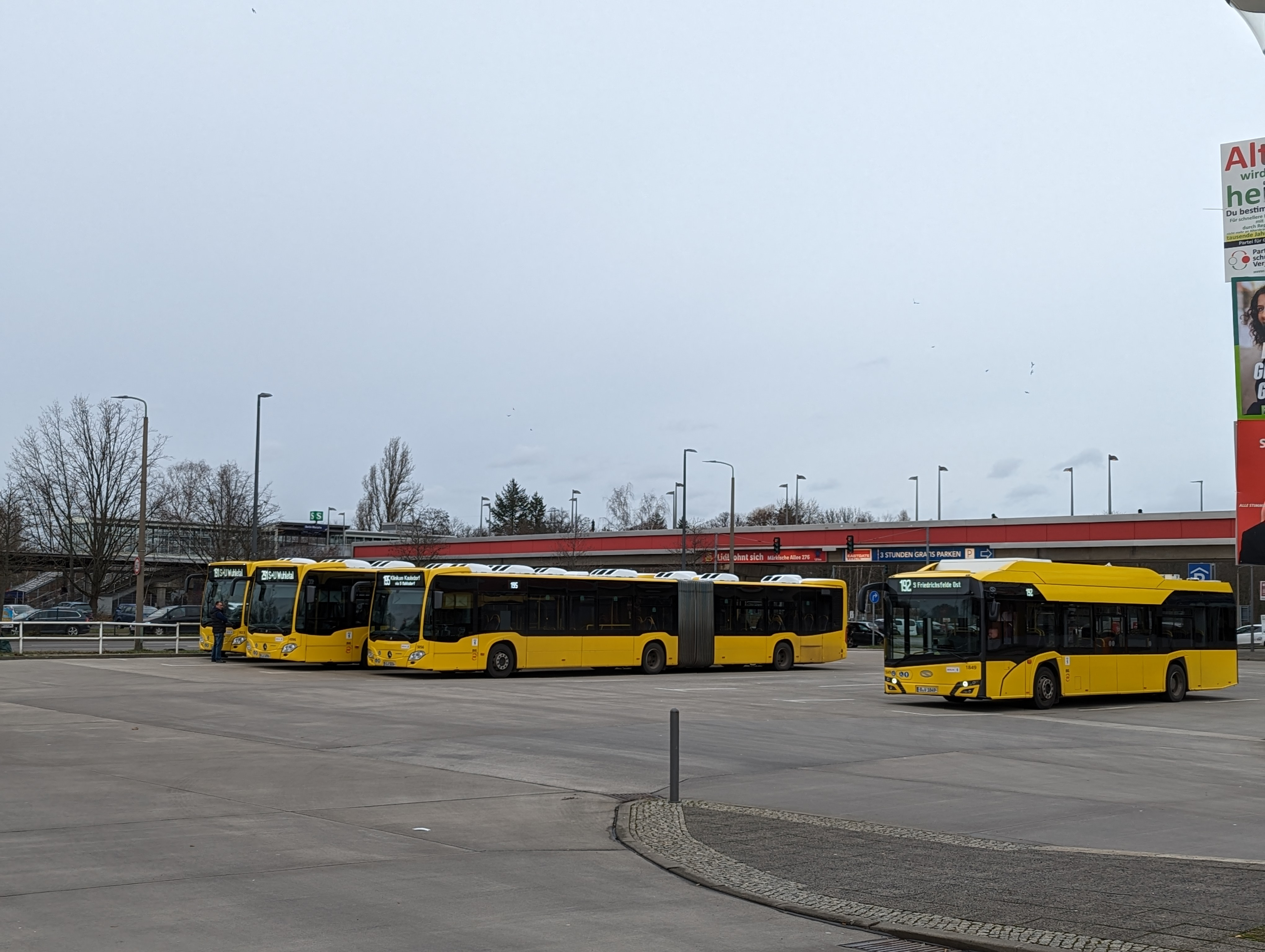
Terminus of various bus lines in the Berlin suburb of Marzahn

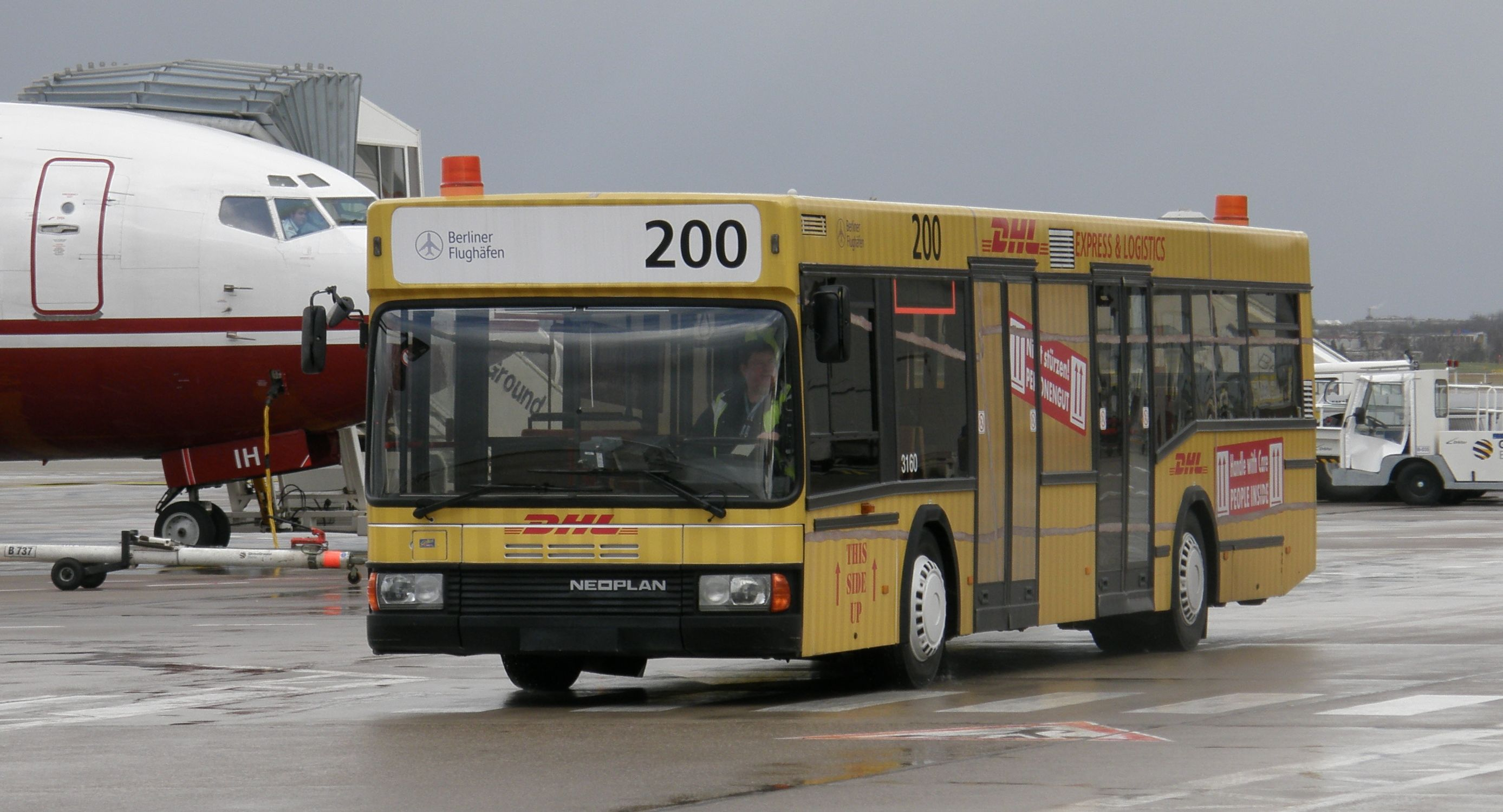
A bus in Berlin Tegel Airport

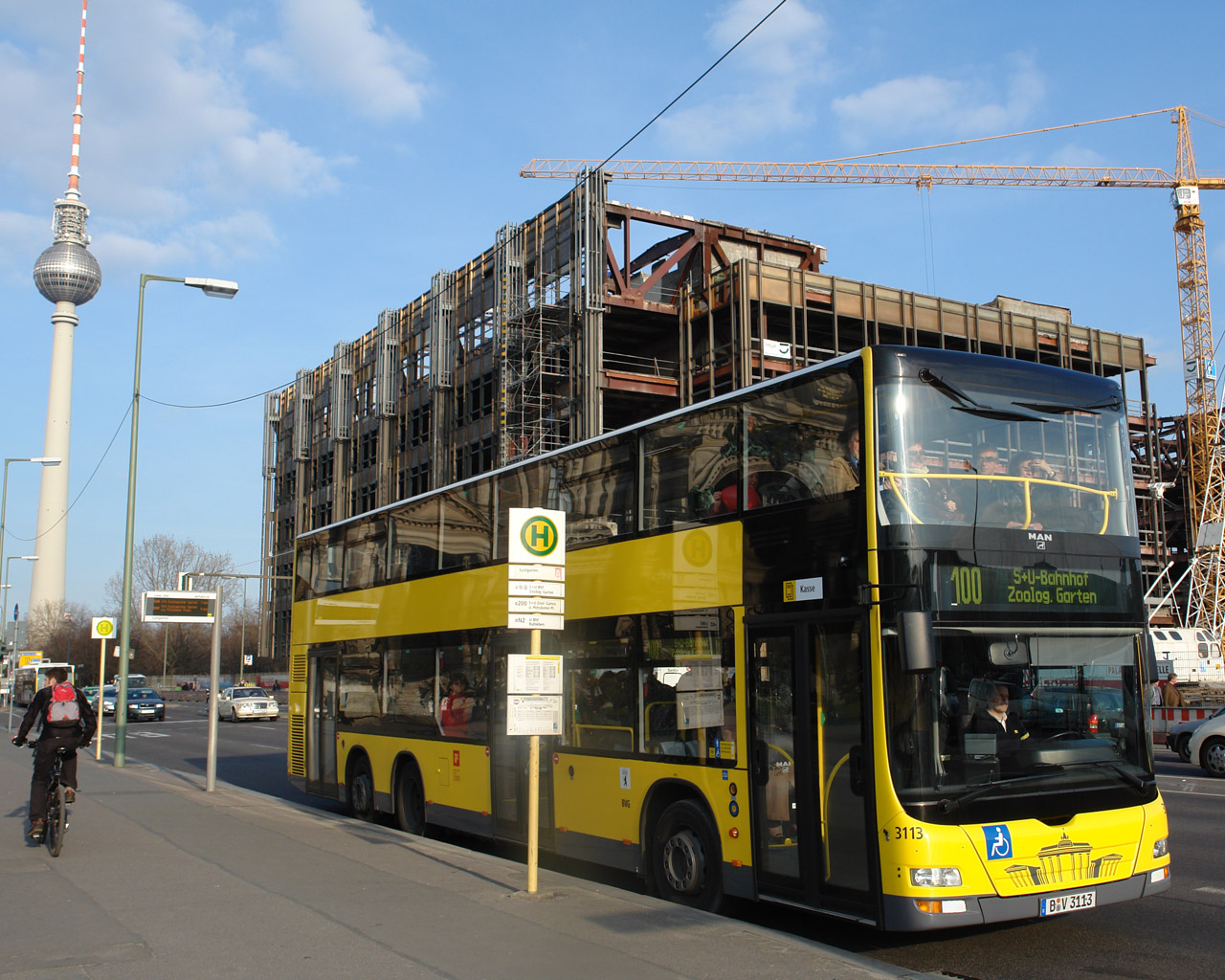
A double-decker bus of line 100 near Alexanderplatz

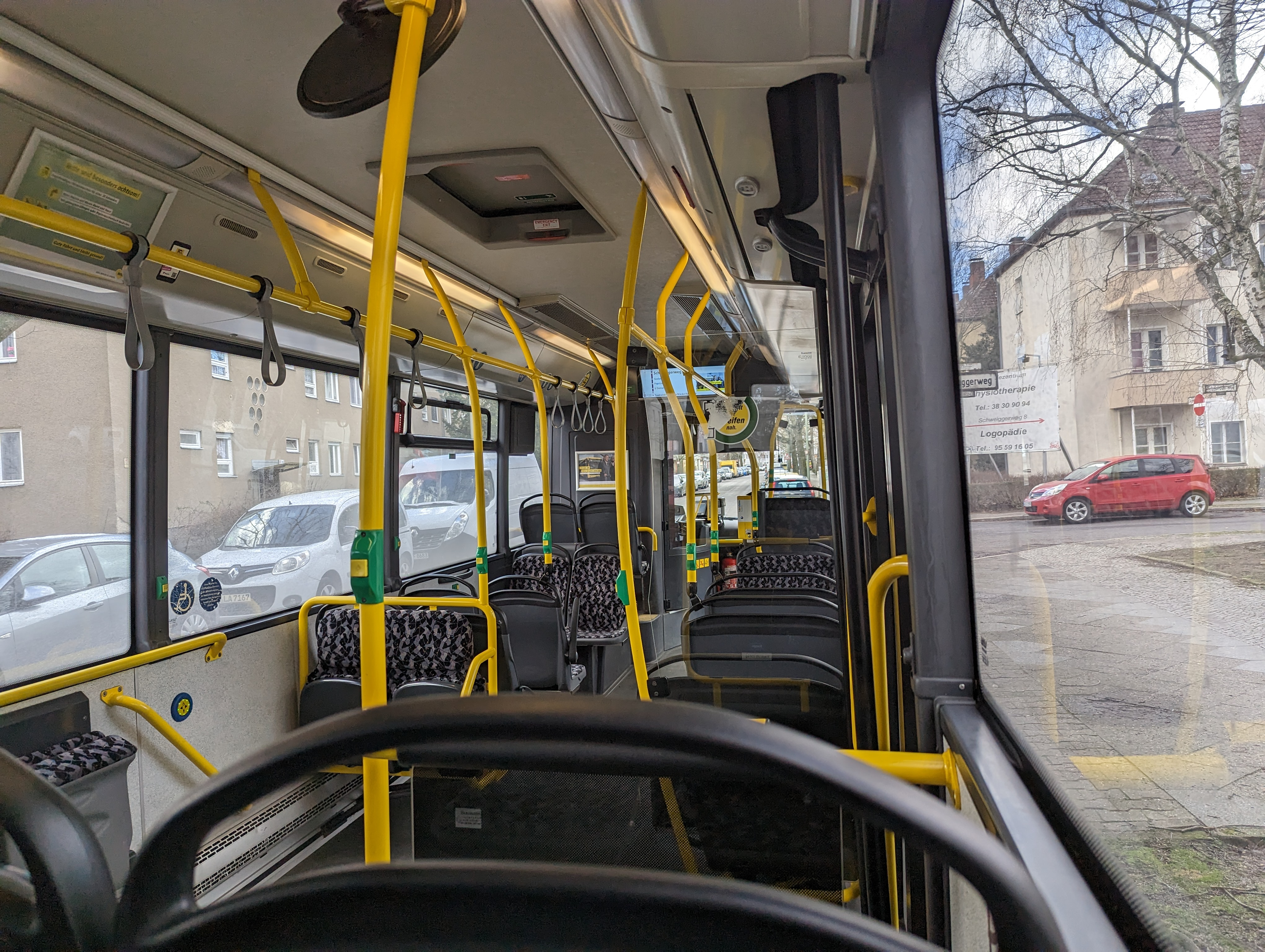
Interior view of a VDL Citea bus in Berlin

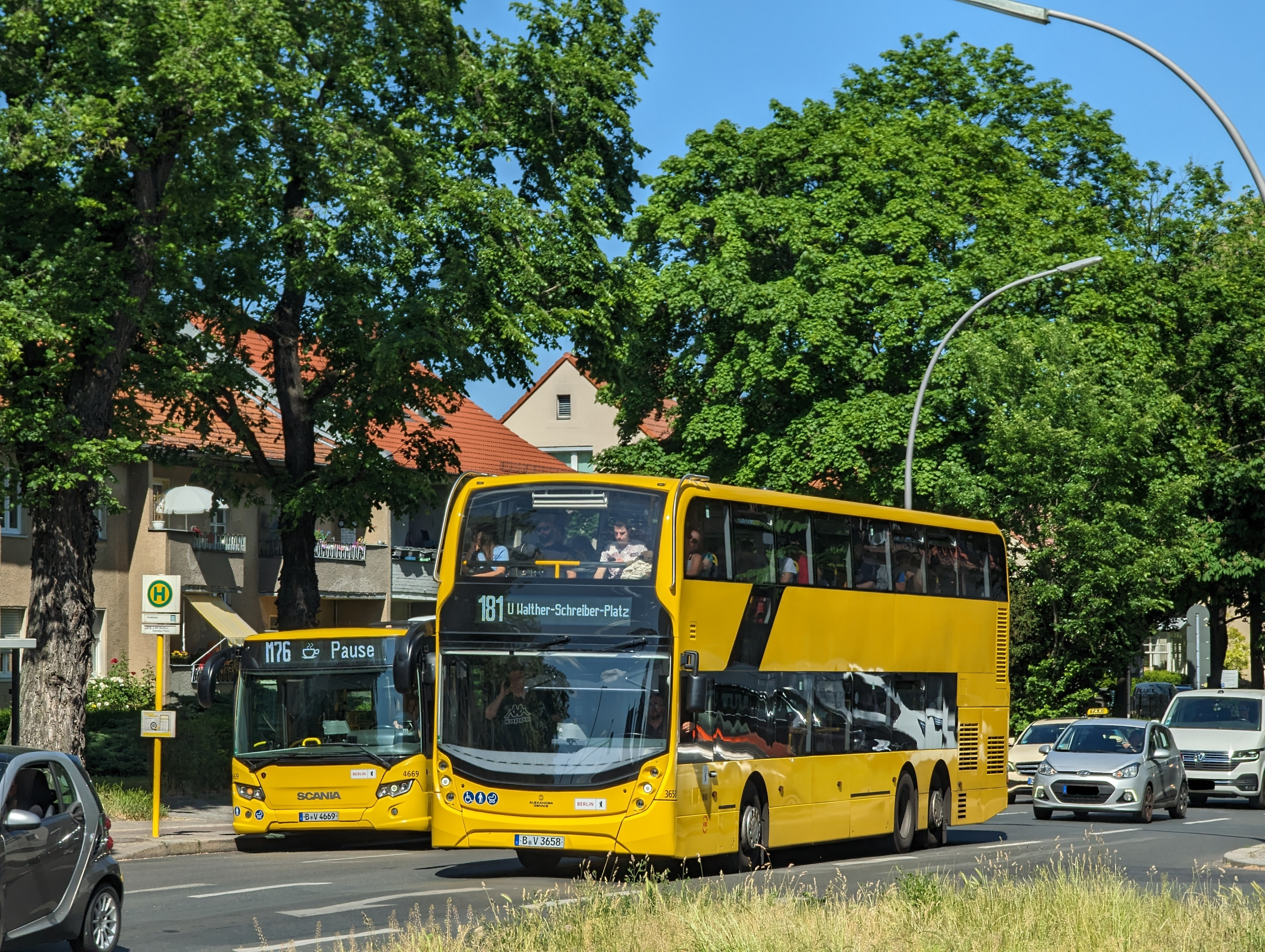
A new Alexander Dennis double decker in Berlin-Mariendorf

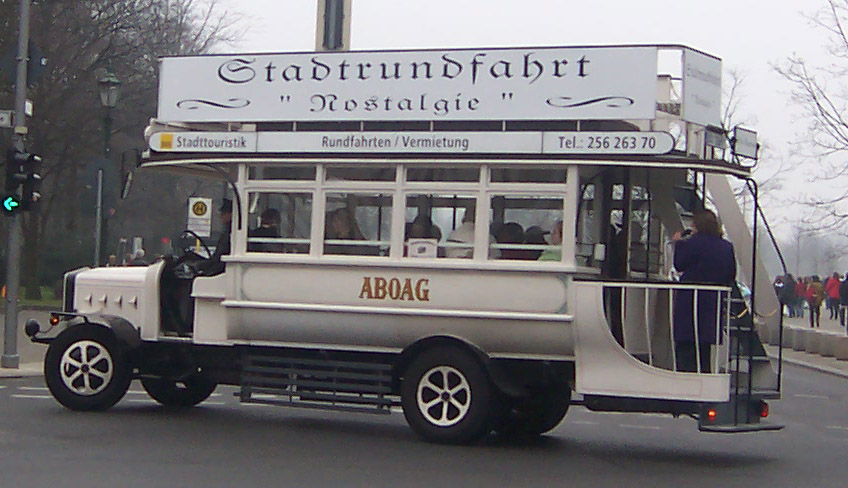
A vintage ABOAG bus used for tourist services

Bus transport is the oldest public transport service in Berlin, the capital city of Germany, having been introduced in 1846. Since 1929, services have been operated by the Berlin Transport Company (German: Berliner Verkehrsbetriebe, BVG), although during the Cold War-era division of the city they operated in West Berlin only. In East Berlin the public transport agency split off from the BVG and rebranded as BVB, operating the buses in the Soviet sector of Berlin.

Currently, the BVG's fleet consists of 1,550 vehicles, which cover 300,000 kilometres per day.

As have many transit operators around the world, the BVG has set a goal to have their entire fleet running without fossil fuels by 2030. For this reason the number of battery electric buses in Berlin is steadily rising.

== History ==
30 October 1846 saw the first bus services from the Concessionierte Berliner Omnibus-Compagnie. In 1868, a new company was created, the ABOAG (Allgemeine Berliner Omnibus Aktien Gesellschaft). Some busses were horse-drawn as of approximately 1906. The last Berlin horse omnibus ran on 25 August 1923, though some horse omnibuses remain in use today for sightseeing tours.

=== Horse-drawn omnibuses ===
The public transport system of Berlin is the oldest one in Germany. In 1825, the first horse-drawn omnibus line from Brandenburger Tor to Charlottenburg was opened by Simon Kremser, already with a timetable. The first omnibus service inside the city operated from 1840 between Alexanderplatz and Potsdamer Bahnhof. It was run by Israel Moses Henoch, who had run the cab service since 1815. On 1 January 1847, the Koncessionierte Berliner Omnibus Compagnie (transl. Concessionary Berlin Bus Company) started its first omnibus line. The growing market witnessed the launch of numerous additional companies, with 36 bus companies in Berlin by 1864. The author Robert Walser, who lived in Berlin around 1906, published a prose piece about a Berlin horse-drawn omnibus titled "Full."

=== 1929 and later ===
On 1 January 1929 merged with other Berlin public transport companies to create the BVG.

Massive Allied bombing of the city during World War II left only 37 busses operating at the end of the war.

After the opening of the Berlin Wall, the transport companies were no longer able to cope with the traffic, and so once again, solo buses by other transport companies and 100 hired coaches were used. The three-digit numbering system was unified and implemented on 2 June 1991, just before the reunification of BVG on 1 January 1992.

== Routes ==
=== Normal buses ===
Normal bus routes make up most of the network and consist of around 120 lines, numbered from 100 to 399. The most famous line is the 100, which serves the tourist route from Alexanderplatz to the Zoological Garden, passing many of Berlin's sights. The suburban buses, operating outside Berlin and not managed by BVG, are included in the tariff area of Berlin public transport.

Each bus line has a three-digit number. The second digit indicates the borough in which the line runs:

- 0 = across more than one or two boroughs
- 1 = for the former boroughs of Wilmersdorf and Zehlendorf
- 2 = for the district of Reinickendorf
- 3 = for the district of Spandau
- 4 = for the districts of Mitte and Friedrichshain-Kreuzberg
- 5 = for the district of Pankow and the former one of Hohenschönhausen
- 6 = for the district of Treptow-Köpenick
- 7 = for the districts of Tempelhof-Schöneberg and Neukölln
- 8 = for the former district of Steglitz
- 9 = for the district of Marzahn-Hellersdorf and the former one of Lichtenberg

These bus routes are:

- 100: S+U Zoologischer Garten ↔ S+U Alexanderplatz
- 101: U Turmstraße ↔ Zehlendorf, Sachtlebenstraße
- 106: U Seestraße ↔ Schöneberg, Lindenhof
- 107: Niederschönhausen, Grabbeallee/Pastor-Niemöller-Platz ↔ Arkenberge
- 108: S+U Lichtenberg ↔ Waldesruh, Mahlsdorfer Allee
- 109: Tegel, Urban Tech Republic ↔ U Jakob-Kaiser-Platz
- 110: S+U Zoologischer Garten ↔ U Oskar-Helene-Heim
- 112: S Nikolassee ↔ Marienfelde, Nahmitzer Damm
- 114: S Wannsee → Zum Heckeshorn → S Wannsee
- 115: Nikolassee, Lissabonallee ↔ U Fehrbelliner Platz
- 118: Rathaus Zehlendorf ↔ Potsdam-Drewitz, Stern-Center
- 120: Märkisches Viertel, Wilhelmsruher Damm ↔ Hauptbahnhof
- 122: U Kurt-Schumacher-Platz ↔ Waidmannslust, Titiseestraße
- 123: S+U Hauptbahnhof ↔ Saatwinkler Damm/Mäckeritzwiesen
- 124: Französisch Buchholz, Aubertstraße ↔ Alt-Heiligensee
- 125: U Osloer Straße ↔ Frohnau
- 128: U Kurt-Schumacher-Platz ↔ U Osloer Straße
- 130: U Ruhleben ↔ Spandau, Westerwaldstraße
- 131: U Ruhleben ↔ Spandau, Im Spektefeld/Schulzentrum
- 133: Alt-Heiligensee ↔ U Haselhorst
- 134: Wasserwerk Spandau ↔ Kladow, Hottengrund
- 135: S+U Rathaus Spandau ↔ Alt-Kladow
- 136: S+U Rathaus Spandau ↔ Hakenfelde
- 137: Spandau, Goldkäferweg ↔ Staaken
- 139: Hakenfelde, Werderstraße ↔ Charlottenburg, Schlosspark-Klink
- 140: S+U Tempelhof ↔ S Ostbahnhof
- 142: U Leopoldplatz ↔ S Ostbahnhof
- 143: Neu-Westend, Brixplatz ↔ Schöneberg, Planetarium
- 147: S Ostbahnhof ↔ U Leopoldplatz
- 150: U Osloer Straße ↔ Karow-Nord, Hofzeichendamm
- 154: Französisch Buchholz, Aubertstraße ↔ Alt-Blankenburg / U Elsterwerdaer Platz
- 155: S+U Pankow ↔ Wilhelmsruh, Fontanestraße
- 156: S Storkower Straße ↔ Weißensee, Piesporter Straße
- 158: Prenzlauer Berg, Michelangelostraße ↔ S Buch
- 160: Schöneweide, Hasselwerderstraße ↔ Altglienicke, Siriusstraße
- 161: Schöneiche, Dorfaue ↔ S Erkner/ZOB
- 162: Schloßplatz Köpenick ↔ U Rudow
- 163: S Schöneweide ↔ S Schönefeld
- 164: S Köpenick ↔ S Schönefeld
- 165: U Märkisches Museum ↔ Köpenick, Müggelschlößchenweg
- 166: S Schöneweide ↔ U Boddinstraße
- 168: Alt-Schmöckwitz ↔ Rauchfangwerder, Moßkopfring
- 169: U Elsterwerdaer Platz ↔ Alt-Müggelheim
- 170: S Rathaus Steglitz ↔ Baumschulenstraße/Fähre
- 171: U Hermannplatz ↔ S Schönefeld
- 172: U Rudow ↔ S Lichtenrade
- 175: S Lichtenrade → Lichtenrade, Nahariyastraße → S Lichtenrade
- 179: U Alt-Mariendorf ↔ Buckow, Gerlinger Straße
- 181: Britz, Kielingerstraße ↔ U Alt-Mariendorf
- 184: S Südkreuz ↔ Teltow
- 186: S Grunewald ↔ S Lichterfelde Süd
- 263: S Grünau ↔ Flughafen BER
- 324: Alt-Heiligensee ↔ Konradshöhe, Falkenplatz
- 326: S Hermsdorf → Veltheimstraße/Schildower Straße → S Hermsdorf
- 327: U Leopoldplatz ↔ S Schönholz
- 334: Hohengatow, Waldschluchtpfad ↔ Alt-Gatow ↔ Gatow, Habichtswald
- 337: Falkenseer Chaussee/Zeppelinstraße ↔ S+U Rathaus Spandau
- 338: Heerstraße/Wilhelmstraße - Seeburg
- 347: S Ostbahnhof ↔ Stralau, Tunnelstraße
- 349: S Grunewald → U Theodor-Heuss-Platz → S Grunewald
- 350: Alt-Karow ↔ Karow-Nord
- 353: Buch, Pölnitzweg ↔ Campus Buch
- 358: S Blankenburg → Gernoder Straße → Treseburger Straße → S Blankenburg → Freischützstraße → S Blankenburg
- 363: S Grünau ↔ Krankenhaus Hedwigshöhe
- 365: S Baumschulenweg → Wilhelminenhof/Edisonstraße → S Baumschulenweg
- 369: Müggelheim Dorf ↔ Gosen, Eiche
- 371: U Rudow → Liselotte-Berger-Platz → U Rudow
- 372: U Rudow → Ostburger Weg/Lettberger Straße → U Rudow
- 377: S Plänterwald ↔ S+U Hermannstraße
- 380: S+U Rathaus Steglitz ↔ Lichterfelde, Saaleckplatz
- 390: S Ahrensfelde → Eiche, Dorf → Eiche, Kaufpark Mehrow, Kirche → S Ahrensfelde
- 395: S Mahlsdorf → U Hönow → S Mahlsdorf
- 396: S Nöldnerplatz ↔ S Karlshorst
- 398: S Mahlsdorf ↔ U Elsterwerdaer Platz
- 399: S Kaulsdorf → Kaulsdorf, Grottkauer Straße → S Kaulsdorf
- 620: Wannsee - Teltow Stadt
- 622: Krumme Lanke - Stahnsdorf
- 623: Oskar-Helene-Heim - Stahnsdorf
- 638: Rathaus Spandau - Potsdam Jungfernsee
- 671: Rathaus Spandau - Nauen
- 694: Potsdam-Hermannswerder - Potsdam-Drewitz
- 697: Kladow - Potsdam-Bornstedt
- 710: Buckower Chaussee - Ludwigsfelde, Birkengrund
- 711: Buckower Chaussee - Großbeeren
- 733: Wernsdorf - Zeuthen
- 743: Lichtenrade - Selchow
- 744: Gropiusstadt - Schönefeld
- 806: Zühlsdorf - Hermsdorf
- 809: Hennigsdorf - Hermsdorf
- 893: Zepernick - Klinikum Buch - Hohenschönhausen
- 941: Hönow - Digitalstraße
- 943: Hoppegarten - Digitalstraße

=== MetroBus ===
As for the MetroTram lines, there are 19 MetroBus lines, each running at least every 10 minutes with a 24-hour service. Unlike the other bus lines, they were shown on many tramway maps and on some railway maps of the city, in their early existence.

The MetroBus routes are:

- M11: U Dahlem-Dorf ↔ S Schöneweide
- M19: S Grunewald ↔ U Mehringdamm
- M21: Rosenthal Nord ↔ U Jungfernheide
- M27: S+U Pankow ↔ S+U Jungfernheide
- M29: Grunewald, Roseneck ↔ U Hermannplatz
- M32: S+U Rathaus Spandau ↔ Dallgow-Döberitz, Havelpark or Staaken, Heidebergplan
- M36: Wilhelmstadt, Am Omnibushof ↔ U Haselhorst
- M37: Spandau, Waldkrankenhaus ↔ Staaken, Hahneberg
- M41: (Baumschulenweg) Sonnenallee/Baumschulenstraße ↔ S+U Hauptbahnhof
- M43: Stralau. Tunnelstraße ↔ U Berliner Straße
- M44: Buckow-Süd, Stuthirtenweg ↔ S+U Hermannstraße
- M45: Spandau, Johannesstift ↔ S+U Zoologischer Garten
- M46: S+U Zoologischer Garten ↔ U Britz-Süd
- M48: Zehlendorf, Bussealle ↔ U Mohrenstraße
- M49: (Staaken) Heerstraße/Nennhauser Damm ↔ S+U Zoologischer Garten
- M76: U Walter-Schreiber-Platz ↔ S Lichtenrade
- M77: Marienfelde, Waldsassener Straße ↔ U Alt-Mariendorf
- M82: Marienfelde, Waldsassener Straße ↔ S+U Rathaus Steglitz
- M85: S Lichterfelde Süd ↔ S+U Hauptbahnhof

=== Express bus ===
The express buses are 13 rapid lines, mainly used to reach the airports or linking the suburbs to the city centre, with far fewer stops. The most famous route is the former TXL bus line (Tegel Airport – Alexanderplatz), which ceased service after the closure of Tegel Airport.

The ExpressBus routes are:

- X7: Flughafen BER – Terminal 1-2 ↔ U Rudow
- X10: S+U Zoologischer Garten ↔ Teltow, Rammrath-Brücke
- X11: U Krumme Lanke ↔ S Schöneweide
- X21: Märkisches Viertel, Quickborner Straße ↔ U Jakob-Kaiser-Platz
- X33: Märkisches Viertel, Wilhelmsruher Damm ↔ S+U Rathaus Spandau
- X34: Kladow, Kaserne Hottengrund or Kladow, Gutsstraße ↔ S+U Zoologischer Garten
- X37: Falkensee Station ↔ U Ruhleben
- X49: Staaken, Hahneberg or Im Spektefeld ↔ U Wilmersdorfer Straße/S Charlottenburg
- X54: S+U Pankow ↔ U Hellersdorf
- X69: Marzahn, Köthener Straße ↔ Köpenick, Müggelschlößchenweg
- X71: U Alt-Mariendorf ↔ Flughafen BER – Terminal 1-2
- X76: U Walter-Schreiber-Platz ↔ Lichtenrade, Nahariyastraße
- X83: (Dahlem) Königin-Luise-Straße/Clayallee ↔ Lichtenrade, Nahariyastraße

=== Night buses ===
The night buses (N) consist of 40 lines and another nine lines to substitute (from N1 to N9) the U-Bahn (except at weekends). The N7X bus line is an express line, only serving stations with higher demand on its journey. The line can also only be taken in one direction towards the airport. The other lines serve suburban neighbourhoods not served by any public service running in daytime.

The aforementioned U-Bahn substitution night bus lines are:

- N1: Warschauer Straße ↔ Zoologischer Garten
- N2: Pankow ↔ Ruhleben
- N3: Wittenbergplatz ↔ Mexikoplatz
- N5: Hauptbahnhof ↔ Hönow
- N6: Alt-Tegel ↔ Alt-Mariendorf
- N7: Rathaus Spandau ↔ Flughafen BER
- N7X: Zoologischer Garten → Flughafen BER
- N8: Märkisches-Viertel ↔ Hermannstraße
- N9: Osloer Straße ↔ Rathaus Steglitz

Others do include:

- N10: Zoologischer Garten ↔ Zehlensdorf
- N12: Zehlendorf Eiche ↔ Stahnsdorf (Loop)
- N16: Nikolasee ↔ Potsdam Hauptbahnhof
- N17: Potsdam-Bornim, Institut für Agrartechnik ↔ Potsdam Am Stern, Johannes-Kepler-Platz
- N18: Zehlendorf Eiche ↔ S Nikolassee
- N20: Frohnau, Hainbuchenstraße ↔ S+U Hauptbahnhof
- N22: Tegelort ↔ Alt-Lübars
- N23: Saatwinkler Damm/Mäckeritzwiesen ↔ U Rohrdamm
- N24: Märkisches Viertel, Wilhelmsruher Damm ↔ S Heiligensee
- N25: S Tegel ↔ Hermsdorfer Damm/Berliner Straße
- N26: U Seestraße ↔ S+U Zoologischer Garten
- N30: S+U Rathaus Spandau ↔ Spandau, Westerwaldstraße
- N33: U Alt-Tegel ↔ U Haselhorst
- N34: S+U Rathaus Spandau ↔ Kladow, Gutsstraße
- N35: Alt-Kladow → Kladow, Hottengrund → Alt-Kladow
- N39: U Rohrdamm ↔ Hakenfelde, Aalemannufer
- N40: S+U Hauptbahnhof ↔ S Karlshorst
- N42: S Südkreuz ↔ S+U Alexanderplatz
- N43: U Theodor-Heuss-Platz ↔ U Berliner Straße
- N50: U Tierpark ↔ Französisch Buchholz Kirche
- N52: U Osloer Straße ↔ Niederschönhausen, Grabbeallee/Pastor-Niemöller-Platz
- N53: Niederschönhausen, Grabbeallee/Pastor-Niemöller-Platz ↔ Märkisches Viertel, Wilhelmsruher Damm
- N56: U Magdelenenstraße ↔ Wartenberg, Hagenower Ring ↔ U Magdelenenstraße
- N58: Prenzlauer Allee/Ostseestraße ↔ S Buch
- N60: S Alexanderplatz ↔ Flughafen BER
- N61: S Rahnsdorf ↔ Hessenwinkel, Dämeritzstraße
- N62: S+U Wuhletal ↔ Wendenschloß
- N63: Bohnsdorf, Waltersdorfer Straße/Parchwitzer Straße ↔ Köpenick, Müggelschlößchenweg
- N64: S+U Wuhletal ↔ S Adlershof
- N65: S+U Alexanderplatz ↔ Rahnsdorf/Waldschänke
- N68: S Adlershof ↔ Alt-Schmöckwitz
- N69: Schloßplatz Köpenick ↔ Wuhletal
- N70: Sonnenallee/Baumschulenstraße ↔ Baumschulenstraße/Köpenicker Landstraße
- N77: S Plänterwald ↔ U Alt-Mariendorf
- N81: U Walther-Schreiber-Platz ↔ Lichtenrade, Nahariyastraße
- N84: S+U Tempelhof ↔ Zehlendorf Eiche
- N88: S+U Rathaus Steglitz ↔ S Lichterfelde Süd
- N91: S+U Wuhletal ↔ Marzahn, Boschpoler Straße
- N94: U Hermannplatz ↔ U Magdalenenstraße
- N95: S Mahlsdorf ↔ Hellerdorf, Riesaer Straße
- N96: S+U Wuhletal ↔ S Mehrower Allee
- N97: Falkenberger Chaussee/Prendener Straße ↔ Marzahn-Nord, Barnimplatz

== Other services ==
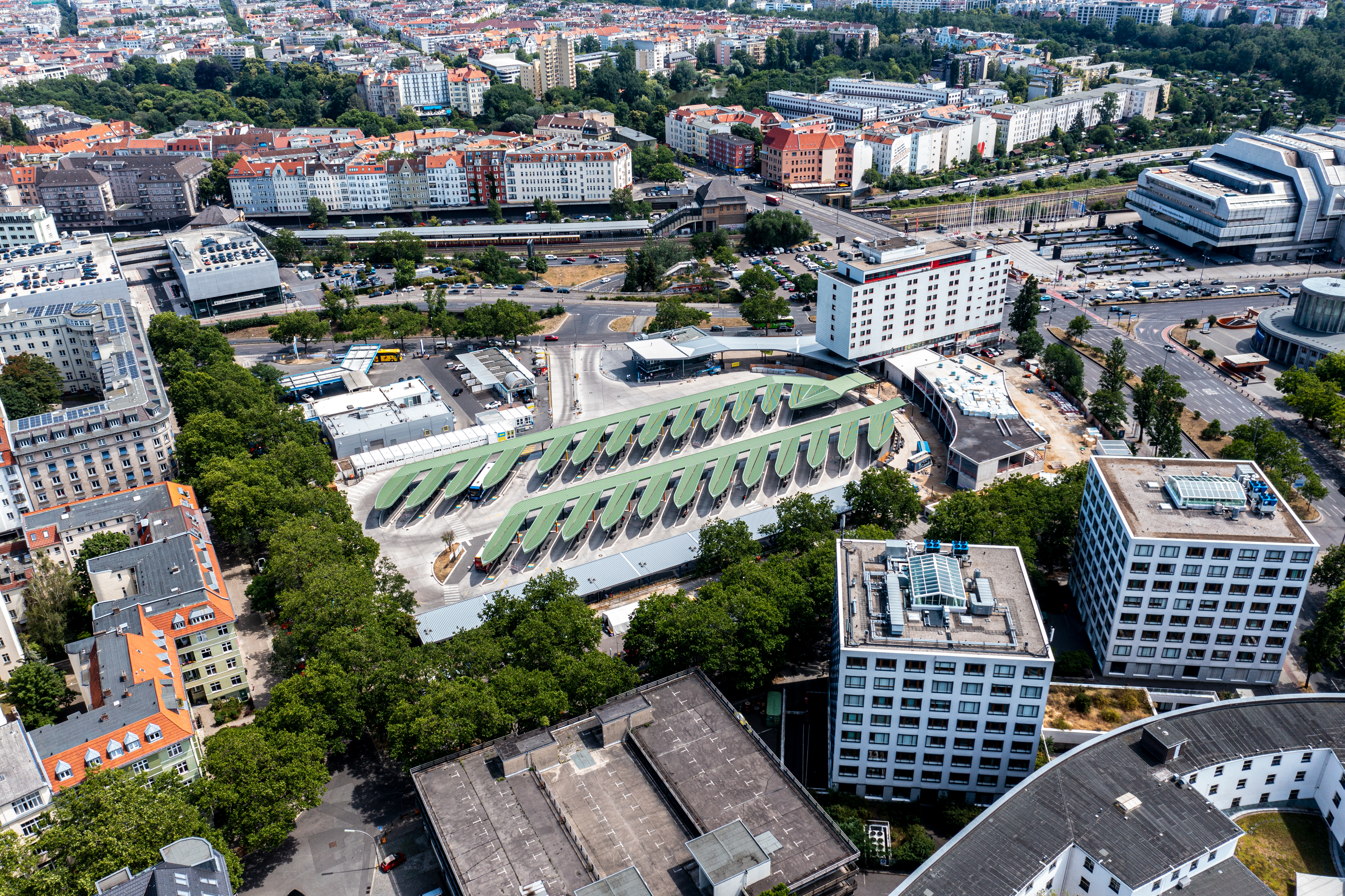
Central Coach Station in Berlin, view from above

Apart from the service buses managed by BVG and other local companies, in the city there are hundreds of private tourist coaches. The main coach bus station of Berlin is the Zentraler Omnibusbahnhof Berlin ("Central Omnibus Station"), also known as ZOB. It is located in Charlottenburg-Wilmersdorf and linked to the stations of Kaiserdamm (U-Bahn) and Messe Nord/ICC (S-Bahn).

== In popular culture ==
On 18 February 2011 MR Software released OMSI – The Bus Simulator (also known as OMSI – Der Omnibussimulator) for Windows. It is a bus simulator set in the late 1980s in West Berlin that features the MAN SD200 and MAN SD202 double-decker buses with a complex set of functions and made in various years. The player operates these buses along line 92 (now M37) that served the Staaken, Wilhelmstadt, Altstadt, and Falkenhagener Feld localities in the borough of Spandau. On 11 December 2013, MR Software released OMSI 2 – The Bus Simulator for Windows, the sequel to OMSI – The Bus Simulator. It features the MAN NL202 and the MAN NG272 in addition to the buses featured in OMSI (MAN SD200/SD202). The player can enjoy the bus lines 5 (now 130), 92 (now M37) and other add-ons (Berlin X10/Berlin BRT/Linie 147/Linie 300) which is community developed. It is sold on Aerosoft, Steam and Halycon. Also, other developers have developed freeware maps of berlin too, such as Spandau M&Z, Linie 100, Projeckt Pankow and more.

The Swiss author Robert Walser wrote a piece titled "Full" (published in 1916) that discusses an ongoing comical battle between the driver of a full Berlin Omnibus and crowds trying to get on despite the supposed fullness. It is included in the 2012 English-language collection Berlin Stories.

== Fleet ==
As of 2023, the BVG bus fleet consists of 1550 buses.

=== Single-decker ===
Quantity	Manufacturer	Type	Passengers	Length	Notes	Photo
108	VDL	EN15 (Citea LLE-120)	100	12 m	In operation since 2015.	
46	VDL	EN18 (Citea LLE-120)	100	12 m	In operation since 2018.	
48	Mercedes-Benz	EN18 (Citaro C2)	106	12 m	In operation since 2018.	Citaro Bus on line M29
23	Mercedes-Benz	EN19 (Citaro C2)	106	12 m	In operation since 2019.	Citaro C2 bus on line 358
57	Mercedes-Benz	EN20 (Citaro C2)	106	12 m	In operation since 2020.	Citaro bus on line 131
40	Mercedes-Benz	EN21 (Citaro C2)	106	12 m	In operation since 2021.	Citaro bus on line 269
1	Solaris	EE18 (Urbino 12 electric)	90	12 m	In operation since 2018. Battery electric bus.	Urbino electric on line X69
15	Solaris	EE19 (Urbino 12 electric)	90	12 m	In operation since 2019. Battery electric bus.	Urbino electric on line X69
15	Mercedes-Benz	EE19 (eCitaro)	88	12 m	In operation since 2019. Battery electric bus.	eCitaro on line 142
90	Solaris	EE20 (Urbino 12 electric)	90	12 m	In operation since 2020. Battery electric bus.	Urbino 12 electric on line 194
>90	Ebusco	EE22 (Ebusco 2.2)	90	12 m	In operation since 2022. Battery electric bus. Currently in delivery.	Ebusco 2.2 on line 300
475	Total					

=== Bendy bus or articulated bus ===
Quantity	Manufacturer	Type	Passengers	Length	Notes	Photo
70	Scania	GN14 (Citywide LFA)	150	18 m	In operation since 2014.	
40	Scania	GN15 (Citywide LFA)	150	18 m	In operation since 2015.	
179	Scania	GN16 (Citywide LFA)	150	18 m	In operation since 2016.	
67	Scania	GN18 (Citywide LFA)	150	18 m	In operation since 2018.	
100	Mercedes-Benz	GN18 (Citaro C2G)	163	18 m	In operation since 2018.	
40	Mercedes-Benz	GN19 (Citaro C2G)	163	18 m	In operation since 2019.	
165	Mercedes-Benz	GN20 (Citaro C2G)	163	18 m	In operation since 2020.	
17	Solaris	GE20 (Urbino 18 electric)	150	18 m	In operation since 2020. Battery electric bus.	
251	Mercedes-Benz	GN21 (Citaro C2G)	163	18 m	In operation since 2021.	
929	Total					

=== Double-decker bus ===
Quantity	Manufacturer	Type	Passengers	Length	Notes	Photo
7	MAN	DL07 (Lion's City DD)	110	13.7 m	In operation since 2007.	
10	MAN	DL08 (Lion's City DD)	110	13.7 m	In operation since 2008.	
1	MAN	DL09 (Lion's City DD)	110	13.7 m	In operation since 2009.	
1	Scania	DN15 (Citywide LFDD)	88	10.9 m	Discontinued in 2021. Only for driving tests.	
2	Alexander Dennis	DL20 (Alexander Dennis Enviro500 MMC)	80 seated	13.8m	In operation since 2021.	
>198	Alexander Dennis	DL20 (Alexander Dennis Enviro500 MMC)	80 seated	13.8 m	In operation since 2021. Currently in delivery.	
145	Total					

== Literature ==
- Dieter Gammrath, Hein Jung: "Berliner Omnibusse". Alba, Düsseldorf 1988, ISBN 3-87094-334-3
- Gammrath, Jung, Schmiedeke: "Berliner Omnibusse". Alba, Düsseldorf 1999, ISBN 3-87094-359-9
