= Bus & Coach of the Year =

Award given to bus/coach models in Europe

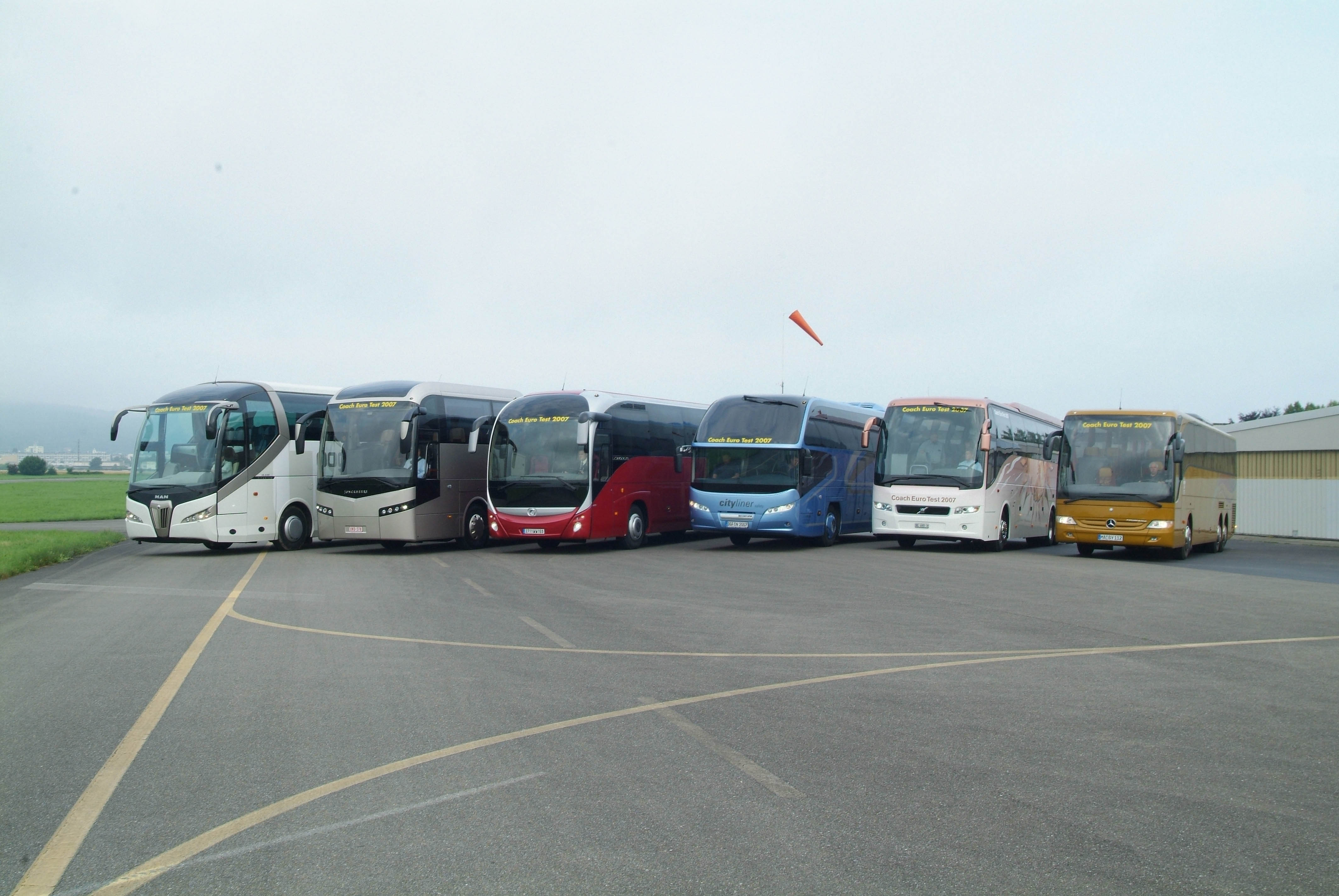
Coach Euro Test 2007

The title Bus of the Year and Coach of the Year, also known as International Bus of the Year and International Coach of the Year, is on alternate years awarded to bus and coach models on the European market. The competition has been organized by several European bus-related publications since 1984.

== The competition ==
In late spring and late summer, three to six bus or coach models that have been submitted by their manufacturers undergo the Bus Euro Test or the Coach Euro Test. The jury consists of around 20 (currently 23) journalists from bus and coach related publications from all over Europe. In odd years the coaches are tested and in even years the buses are tested, and the winner receives the award entitled for the following year. So at Coach Euro Test 2015, the Coach of the Year 2016 is chosen, and at Bus Euro Test 2016, the Bus of the Year 2017 is chosen. Only the winner is presented, no runners-up.

The award ceremonies take place at selected bus exhibitions in the autumn.

== Jury members ==
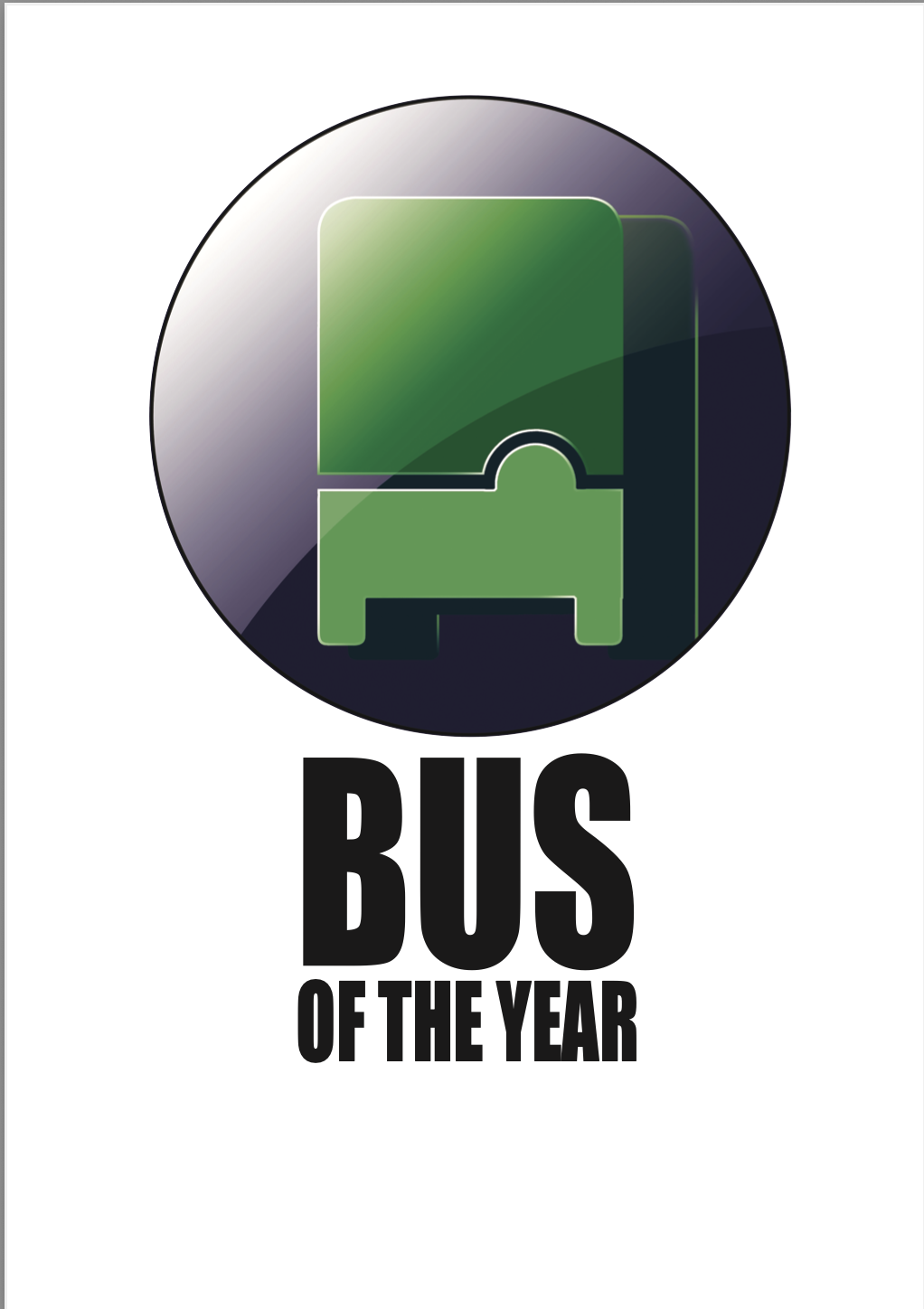
official logo

The following 23 European publications each appoint a journalist to the jury in Bus & Coach of the Year. (List as of November 2025.)

Country	Publication
Austria	Öbus
Belgium	Transporama Trans Aktueel
Bulgaria	Kamioni, Avtobusi
Croatia	Kamion & Bus
Czech Republic	Transport a logistika
Denmark	Transportnyhederne.dk
Finland	Charter Club
France	Autocar & Bus Info
Germany	Omnibusrevue
Greece	Troxoikaitir
Hungary	Rolling Tons
Ireland	Fleet Bus and Coach
Italy	Pullman
Norway	Bussmagasinet
Poland	Infobus
Romania	Tranzit
Serbia	Veliki tockovi
Spain	Autobuses & Autocares
Sweden	Bussmagasinet.se
Slovenia	Transport & Logistika
Switzerland	TIR transNews
Turkey	Autoticari
United Kingdom	Bus & Coach Buyer

== Winners ==
Title	Award ceremony	Winner(s)	Picture	Test location	Other contestants
Coach of the Year 2026	Busworld Brussels 3 October 2025	Setra TopClass S516 Hdh		Modena, Italy 8-12 September 2025	IVECO Evadys Neoplan Skyliner Auwarter Edition
Bus of the Year 2025	IAA Transportation Hanover 16 September 2024	Solaris Urbino 18 hydrogen		Kladno, Czech Republic 7-10 May 2024	Ebusco 3.0 - 18M MAN Lion's City LE 12 E Mercedes-Benz eCitaro fuel cell VDL Citea LE122 Electric
Bus of the Year 2023	IAA Transportation, Hanover 20 September 2022	MAN Lion's City 12 E		Limerick, Ireland 9-12 May 2022	Higer Azure Mercedes-Benz eCitaro Karsan e-ATA 12 Volvo BZL
Coach of the Year 2022	MAN Bus Forum 14 October 2021	Neoplan Cityliner		Bled, Slovenia 6-9 September 2021	Setra S 511 HD VDL Futura FDD2 Volvo 9700 DD
Coach of the Year 2020	Busworld Brussels 19 October 2019	MAN Lion's Coach C		Sibiu, Romania	Setra S 531 DT Iveco Crossway CNG Volvo 9900 VDL Futura FHD2
Bus of the Year 2019	IAA Nutzfahrzeuge; 22 September 2018	Mercedes-Benz Citaro hybrid		Zagreb, Croatia	Irizar ieTram; Heuliez GX337 Linium Elec
Coach of the Year 2018	Busworld Kortrijk; 19 October 2017	Irizar i8		Mantorp, Sweden; 4-7 September 2017	Iveco Evadys; Mercedes-Benz Tourismo; Neoplan Tourliner; Scania Interlink; VDL Futura FDD2
Bus of the Year 2017	IAA Nutzfahrzeuge 21 September 2016	Solaris Urbino 12 electric		Brussels, Belgium	Mercedes-Benz Citaro NGT Van Hool Exqui.City Irizar i2e Ebusco 2.1
Coach of the Year 2016	Busworld Kortrijk 2015	Iveco Magelys		Plovdiv, Bulgaria; 16-19 June 2015	Neoplan Skyliner; Setra S 516 HDH; Sunsundegui SC7; Temsa HD12; VDL Futura MD
Bus of the Year 2015	IAA Nutzfahrzeuge; 2014	MAN NG313-18,75 Lion's City GL CNG		Lucerne, Switzerland	Iveco Urbanway 18M Full Hybrid; Mercedes-Benz Citaro G Scania CN340UB Citywide LF CNG; VDL Citea SLFA-180/360
Coach of the Year 2014	Busworld Kortrijk; 18 October 2013	Setra S 515 HD		Ybbs, Austria; July 2013	Mercedes-Benz Travego M Van Hool TDX27 Astromega
Bus of the Year 2013	IAA Nutzfahrzeuge; 20 September 2012	Mercedes-Benz Citaro C2		Versailles, France	Irisbus Citelis 12M Hybrid; MAN NL253 Lion's City Hybrid; VDL Citea LLE-120/225; Volvo 7900 Hybrid
Coach of the Year 2012	Busworld Kortrijk; October 2011	VDL Futura FHD2		Arendal, Norway; 1–3 June 2011	Irizar i6 Integral; Setra S416GT-HD/2; Scania TK400EB Touring HD 6x2 Viseon C13; Volvo 9500
Bus of the Year 2011	IAA Nutzfahrzeuge; 21 September 2010	VDL Citea		Bucharest, Romania	Mercededes-Benz Citaro; Otokar Kent 290LF; Temsa Avenue LF; Volvo 7700 Hybrid
Coach of the Year 2010	Busworld Kortrijk; 15 October 2009	Mercedes-Benz Travego M		Senlis, France	Barbi Maestro; Neoplan Cityliner C Plaxton Elite; Van Hool TD920 Altano
Bus of the Year 2009	IAA Nutzfahrzeuge; 23 September 2008	Setra S 415 NF		Berlin, Germany; 7–9 May 2008	MAN NL 273 Lion's City H2; Optare Versa
Coach of the Year 2008	Busworld Kortrijk; 19 October 2007	Volvo 9700 NG		Zürich, Switzerland; June 2007	Irisbus Magelys; Mercedes-Benz Tourismo M Neoplan Cityliner; Noge Titanium; VDL Jonckheere
Bus of the Year 2007	IAA Nutzfahrzeuge; 19 September 2006	Mercedes-Benz Citaro LE Ü			
Coach of the Year 2006	Busworld Kortrijk; 20 October 2005	Neoplan N5218SHDL Starliner L			
Bus of the Year 2005	IAA Nutzfahrzeuge; 21 September 2004	MAN NLxx3 Lion's City			
Coach of the Year 2004	Busworld Kortrijk; 18 October 2003	MAN RHSxx4 Lion's Star			
Coach of the Year 2004	Busworld Kortrijk; 18 October 2003	Scania K124EB / Irizar PB			
Bus of the Year 2003	FIAA Madrid; 23 October 2002	Van Hool newA330			
Coach of the Year 2002	Busworld Kortrijk; 2001	Setra S 415 HDH			
Bus of the Year 2001	FIAA Madrid; 22 November 2000	Mercedes-Benz Cito			
Coach of the Year 2000	Busworld Kortrijk; 1999	Neoplan N 516/3 SHDL Starliner			
Bus of the Year 1999	FIAA Madrid; 18 November 1998	MAN NL 263 (A21)			
Coach of the Year 1998	Busworld Kortrijk; 16 October 1997	Van Hool T9 Acron			
Bus of the Year 1997		Setra S 315 NF			
Coach of the Year 1996	Car & Bus Kortrijk; 19 October 1995	Volvo B12-600 (Drögmöller E330H EuroComet)			
Bus of the Year 1995		Neoplan Metroshuttle N 4114			
Coach of the Year 1995	Autobus RAI Maastricht; October 1994	Iveco EuroClass HD			
Coach of the Year 1994	Car & Bus Kortrijk; October 1993	MAN RH403 Lion's Star			
Coach of the Year 1993		Setra S 315 HDH			
Coach of the Year 1992		Mercedes-Benz O404			
Coach of the Year 1991		Renault FR1 GTX			
Bus of the Year 1990		Neoplan Metroliner			
Bus & Coach of the Year 1989		Van Hool Acron			
Bus & Coach of the Year 1988		Berkhof Excellence 2000			
Bus & Coach of the Year 1987		Bova Futura			
Bus & Coach of the Year 1986		Volvo C10M			
Bus & Coach of the Year 1984		LAG Galaxy			

== See also ==
- List of motor vehicle awards
- International Truck of the Year
