= Solaris Urbino 12 electric =

Electric bus series produced by Solaris since 2013

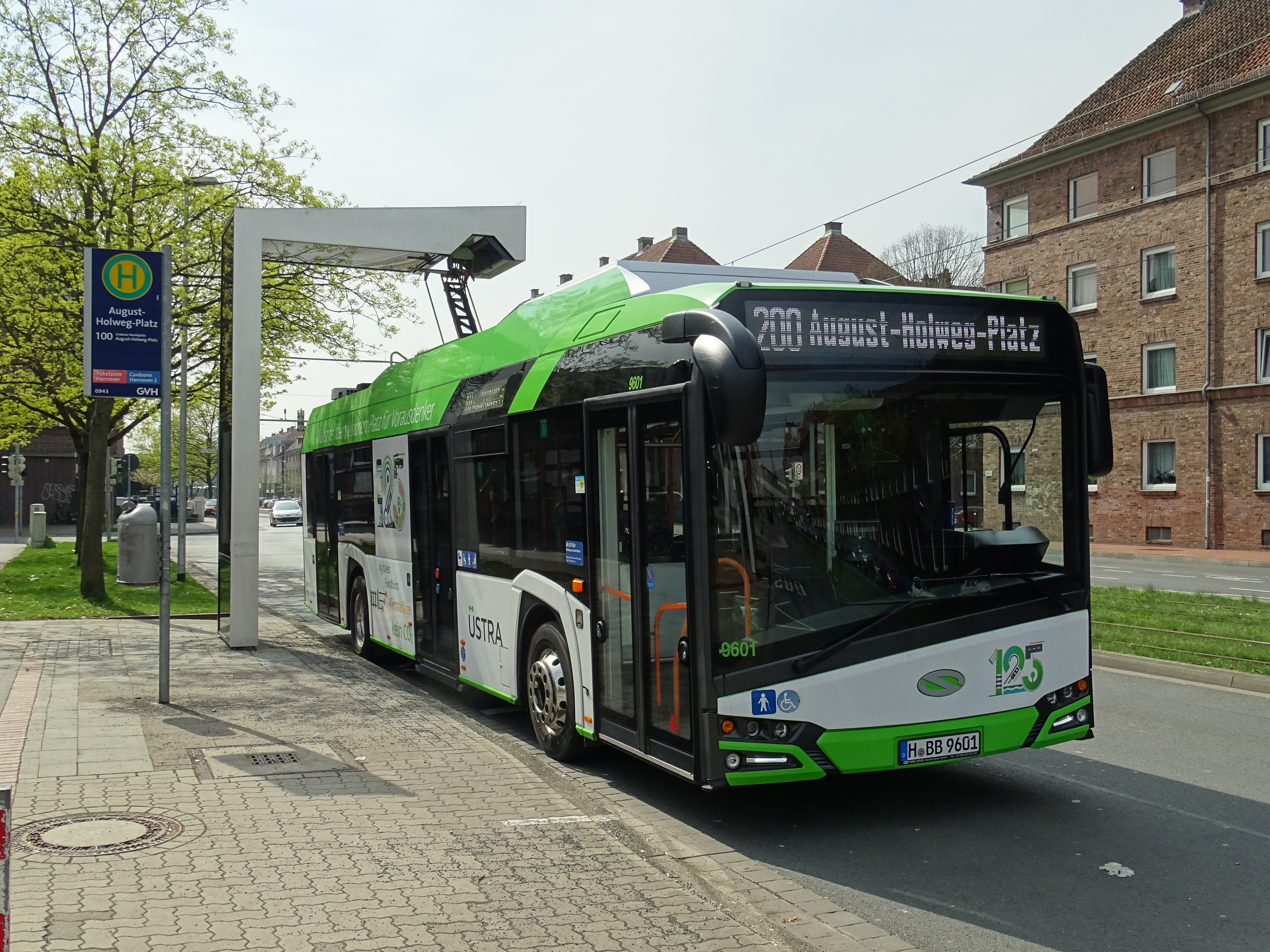
- Solaris Urbino 12 electric 4th generation

Overview
- Manufacturer: Solaris Bus & Coach
- Also called: Škoda Perun
- Production: 2013–present
- Assembly: Bolechowo, Poland

Body and chassis
- Class: Single-deck city-bus
- Platform: Solaris Urbino
- Doors: 2-3
- Floor type: Low-floor

Powertrain
- Electric motor: Asynchronous electric motor: TSA TMF 35-28-4 (1 × 160 kW [210 hp]) (third and fourth generation); ZF AVE130 350V driving axle (2 × 120 kW [160 hp]) (third generation and beginning of fourth generation); ZF AVE130 400V axle (2 × 125 kW [168 hp]) (fourth generation)
- Battery: Solaris High Energy
- Plug-in charging: Plug-in, pantograph, induction

Dimensions
- Wheelbase: 5,900 mm (230 in)
- Length: 12,000 mm (39 ft 4 in)
- Width: 2,550 mm (100 in)
- Height: 3,300–3,480 mm (10 ft 10 in – 11 ft 5 in)
- Curb weight: 19 t (19 long tons; 21 short tons)

The Solaris Urbino 12 electric is an electric version of the Solaris Urbino 12 low-floor transit bus series first unveiled in 2012. It has been in production since 2013, and in 2016, it was awarded the title of Bus of the Year 2017.

== Origins ==
In 1999 Solaris unveiled its first city bus of the Urbino family – the Solaris Urbino 12. In subsequent years the city bus range was broadened, as new models were added, though initially these were conventionally fuelled vehicles. In 2002, Solaris presented a new version of the Urbino, the so-called 2nd generation. Two years later, in 2004, the third generation of the Urbino had its première. In 2006, at the IAA Nutzfahrzeuge trade fair in Hanover, Solaris Bus & Coach displayed a third generation bus which was also the first of its hybrid models, the Solaris Urbino 18 Hybrid made in collaboration with US firms Allison Transmission and Cummins. It was the first serially produced hybrid bus in Europe. As a result, Solaris joined the European leaders of eco-friendly technology in public transport.

Solaris' first fully electric bus, the Urbino 8,9 LE electric, was unveiled in 2012. Initially, the bus only had a 100-kilometre (62 mi) range, however, with time, thanks to technological progress, the achievable range increased. The vehicle was tested among others in Poznań, Cracow, and in Warsaw. The first buyer of that electric Solaris bus was an Austrian operator, from Klagenfurt. Vehicles of that type were also the first electric buses in Poland used by a public transport operator.

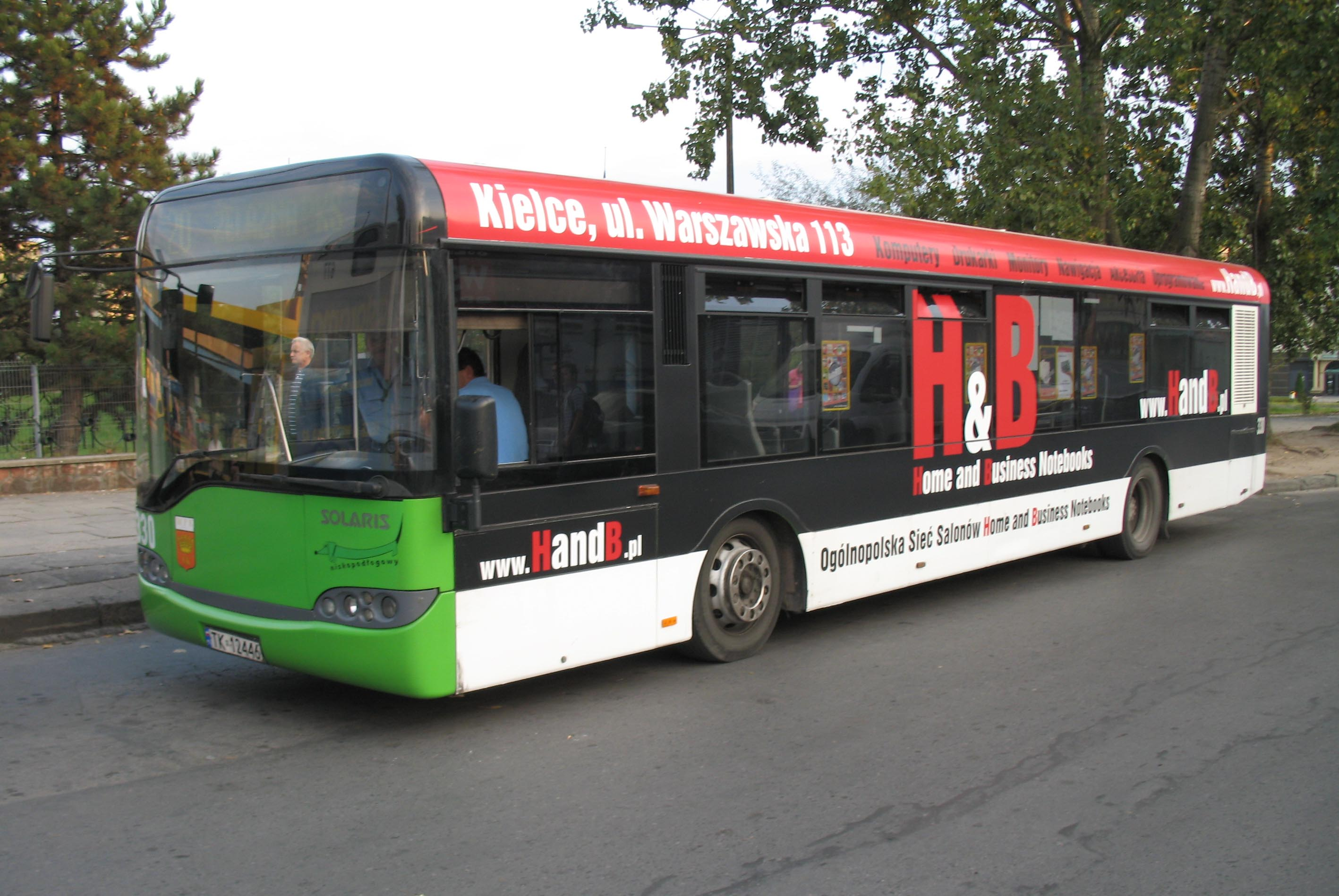
Solaris Urbino 12 of the 1st generation

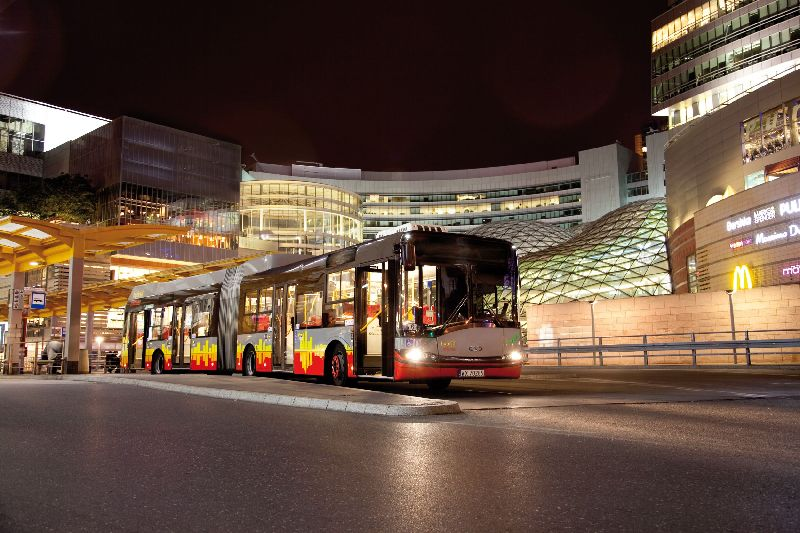
Solaris Urbino 18 Hybrid

== Third generation ==
The IAA 2012 in Hanover saw the première of the first 100% electric bus of the MAXI class – the Urbino 12 electric. The manufacturer used a powertrain based on an asynchronous, four-pole motor of 160 kW (210 hp) in the prototype vehicle. Moreover, lithium-ion batteries with a capacity of 210 kWh were used to store energy recuperated during braking. A plug-in connector installed in the vehicle enabled recharging by means of an external power source. The producer also decided to electrify all external devices usually fed from a diesel engine, including i.a. air conditioning with an in-built CO_{2} heat pump, that is a device also used for heating in the bus. External and interior lighting was based on LED technology. The graphic symbol of the Urbino electric featured a green dachshund, the trademark symbol of Solaris, with a cable and plug instead of a tail.

After its première in 2012, the Solaris Urbino 12 electric was produced in many different configurations, with a wide range of suppliers of powertrains and charging systems, so as to offer solutions fitted best to the individual needs of its clients.

The first five 12-metre electric buses made it to the public transport operator in Braunschweig, Germany, in 2014, as part of the EMIL programme. They were equipped with the inductive charging system PRIMOVE by Bombardier. In May 2015, public transport operator PKM Jaworzno was the first in Poland to receive an Urbino 12 electric. The same month operator MPK Kraków started test runs for two prototype vehicles. Once the tests were completed, one of the buses was bought by MPK. In May 2015, the first of a batch of 10 buses for Warsaw public transport operator MZA Warszawa was delivered. Mid-2015, Solaris also supplied four emission-free buses to Berlin municipal operator BVG. Other cities using Solaris Urbino 12 electric of the third generation include Oberhausen, Düsseldorf, Drezno and Västerås.

The electric bus model Škoda Perun was crafted based on the third generation Solaris Urbino 12 electric, and in collaboration with Czech firm Škoda Transportation. The chassis and bodywork are made by Solaris, while powertrain and electric fittings are supplied by Škoda Electric. Vehicles in this configuration are offered by Škoda Electric mostly to customers on the Czech and the Slovak market.

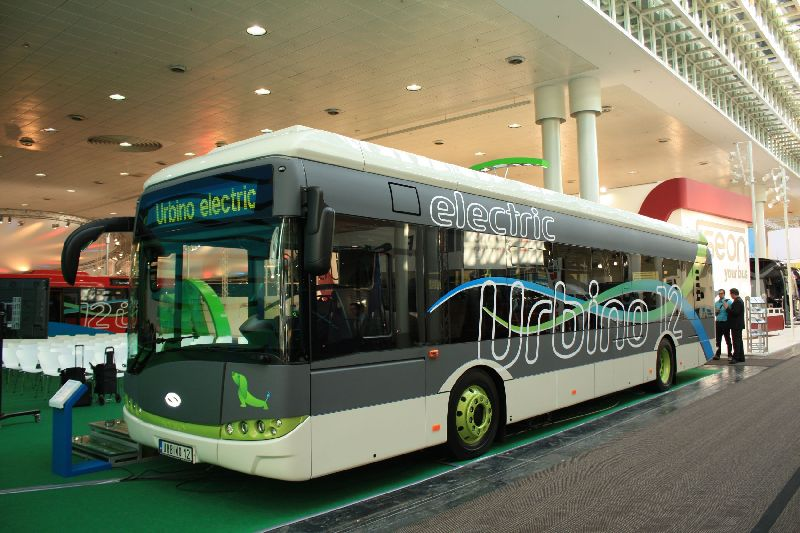
Worldwide première of Solaris Urbino 12 electric in Hanover

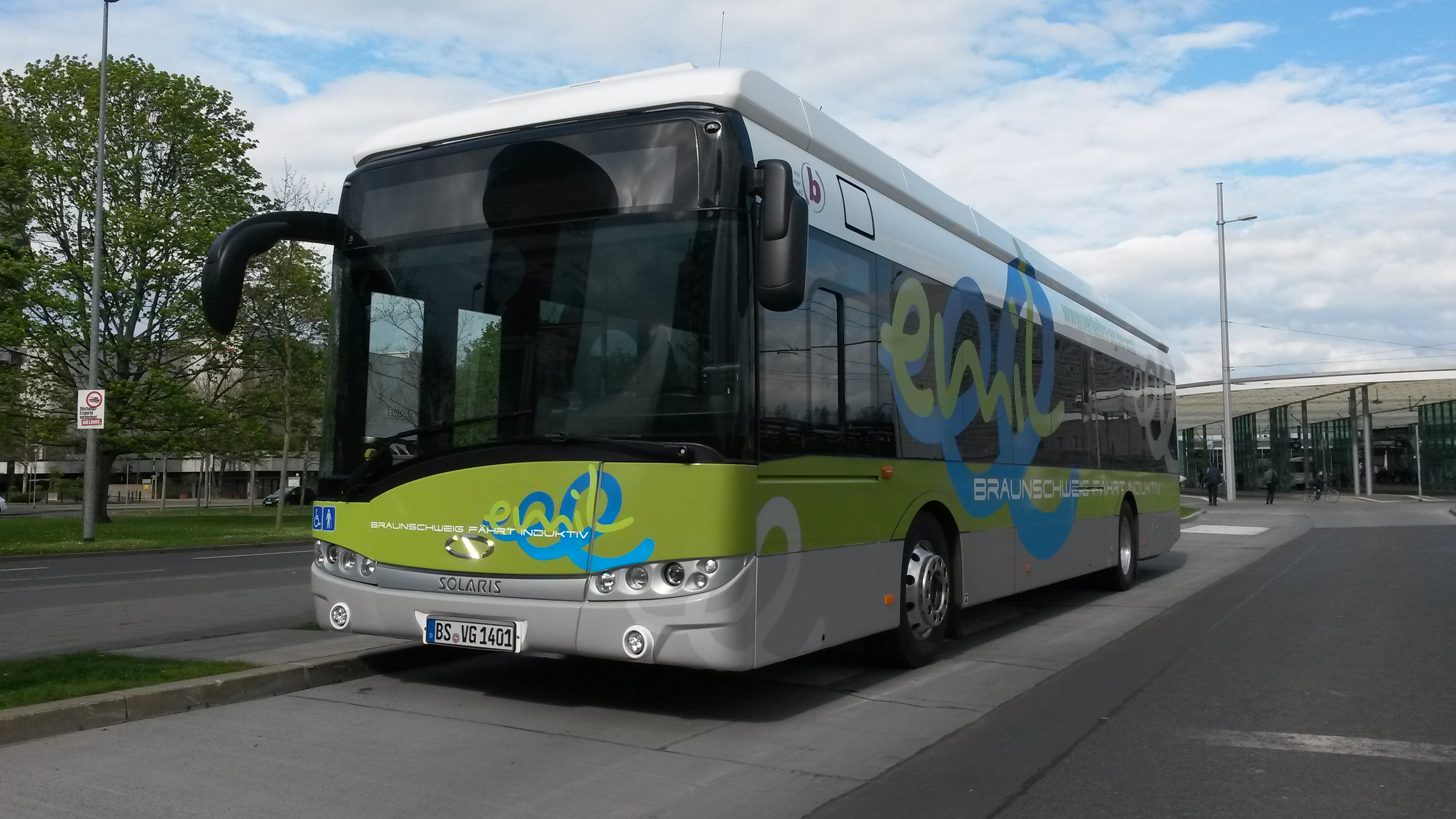
Solaris Urbino 12 electric in Braunschweig - one of the five first serially produced buses

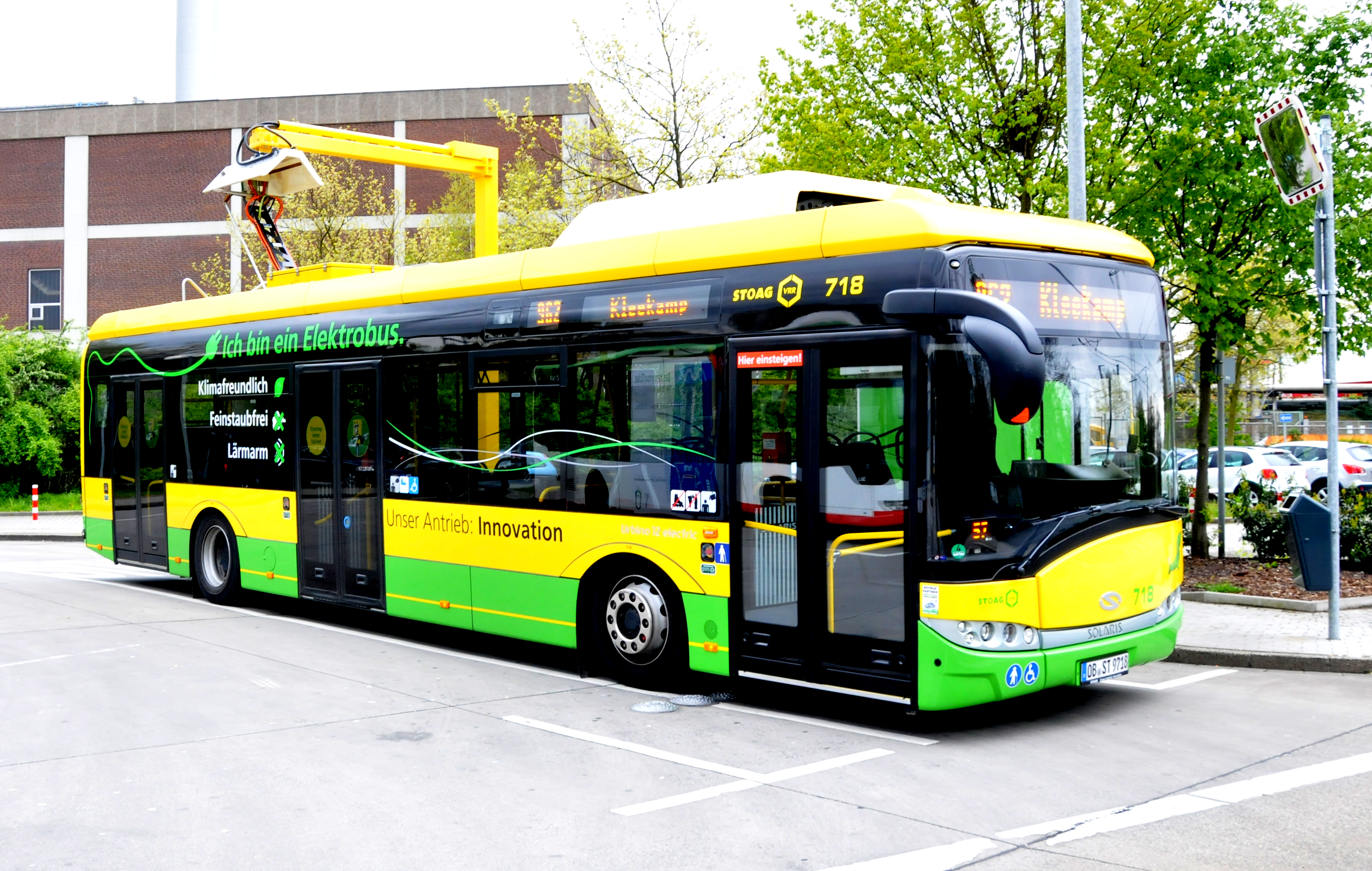
Solaris Urbino 12 electric in Oberhausen

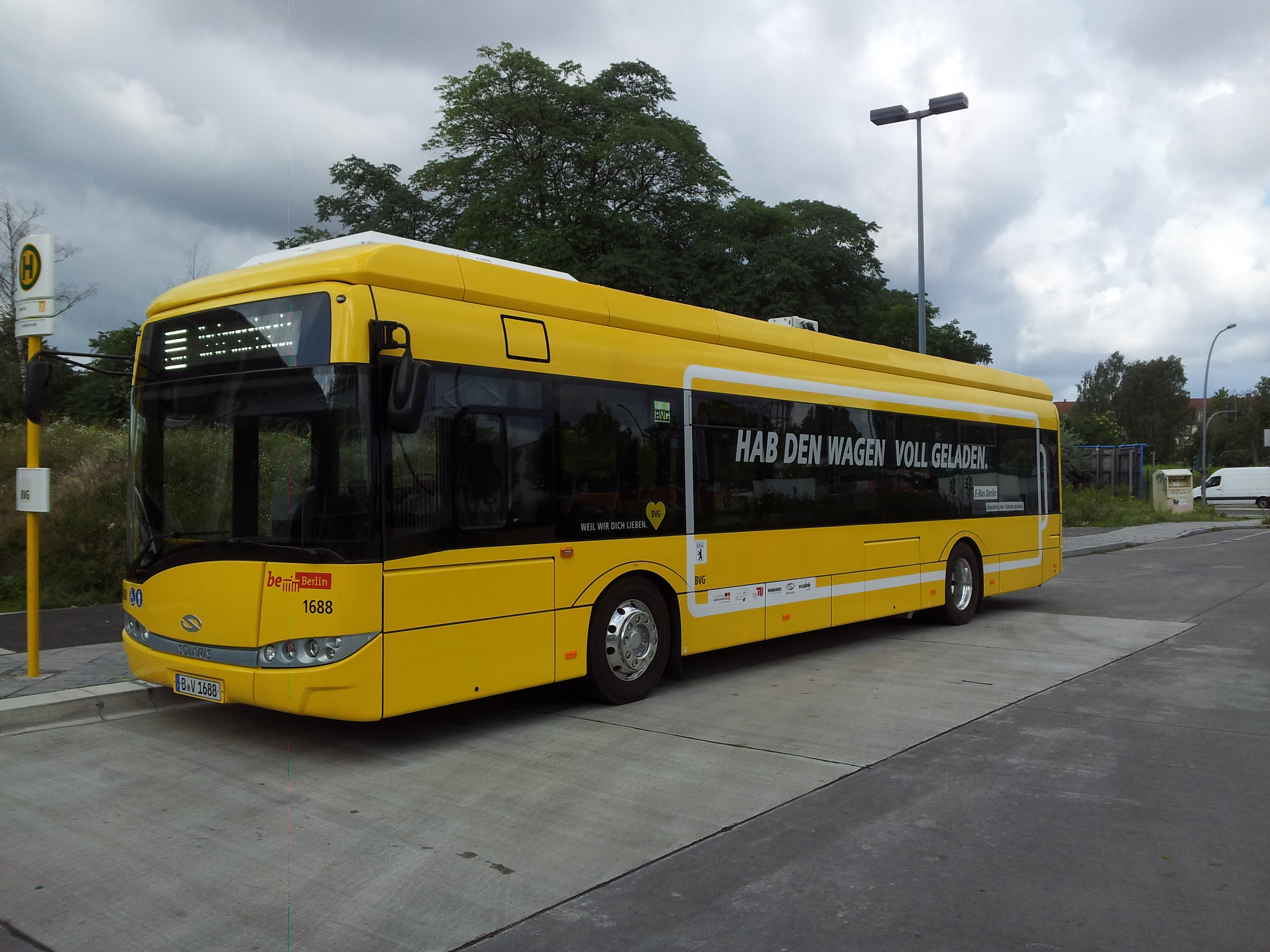
In Berlin, electric Solaris buses service line 204.

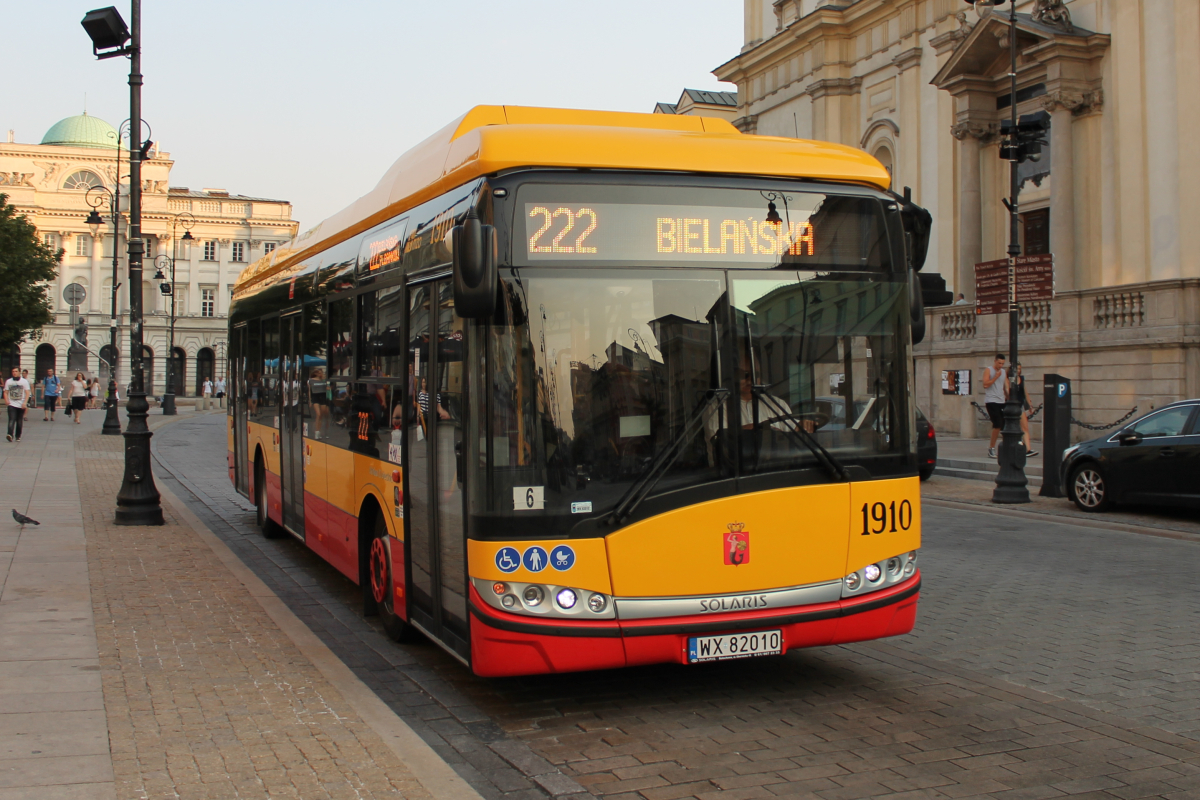
Warsaw's Urbino 12 electric running on representative street Krakowskie Przedmieście (line 222)

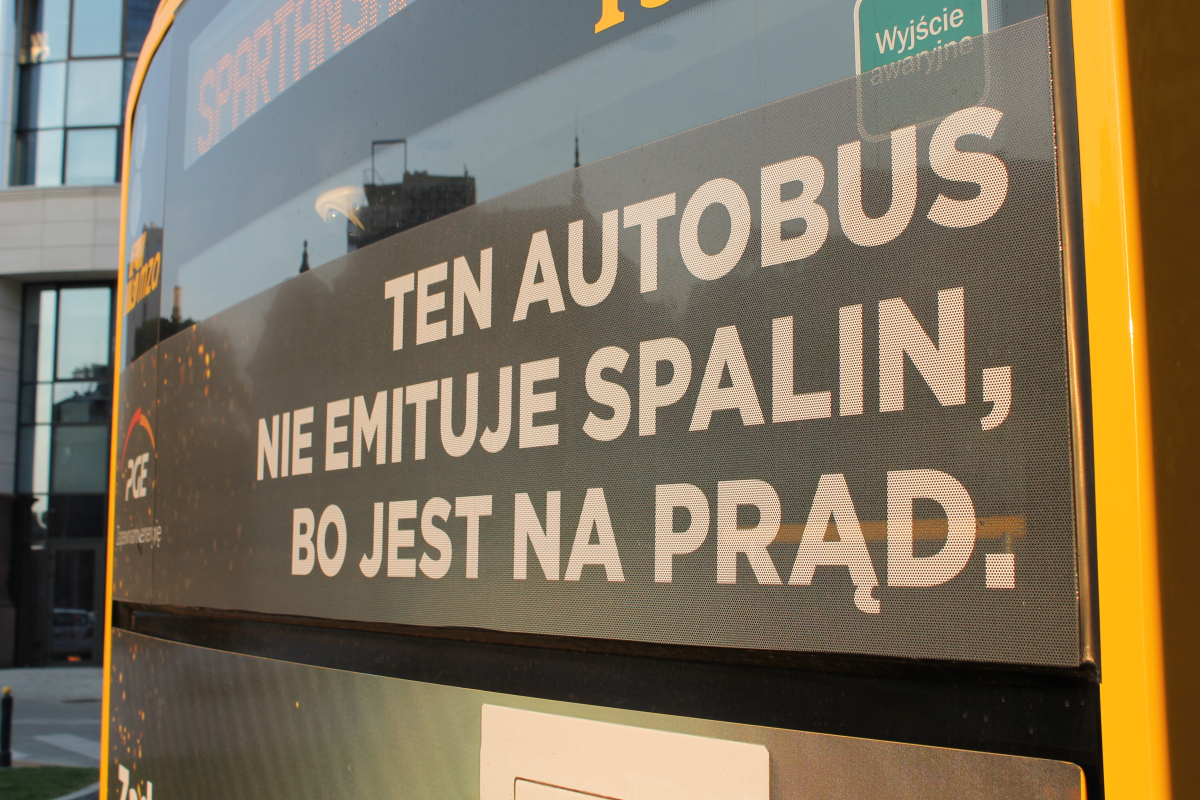
Ad informing about the environmentally friendly driveline of buses used by operator MZA Warszawa

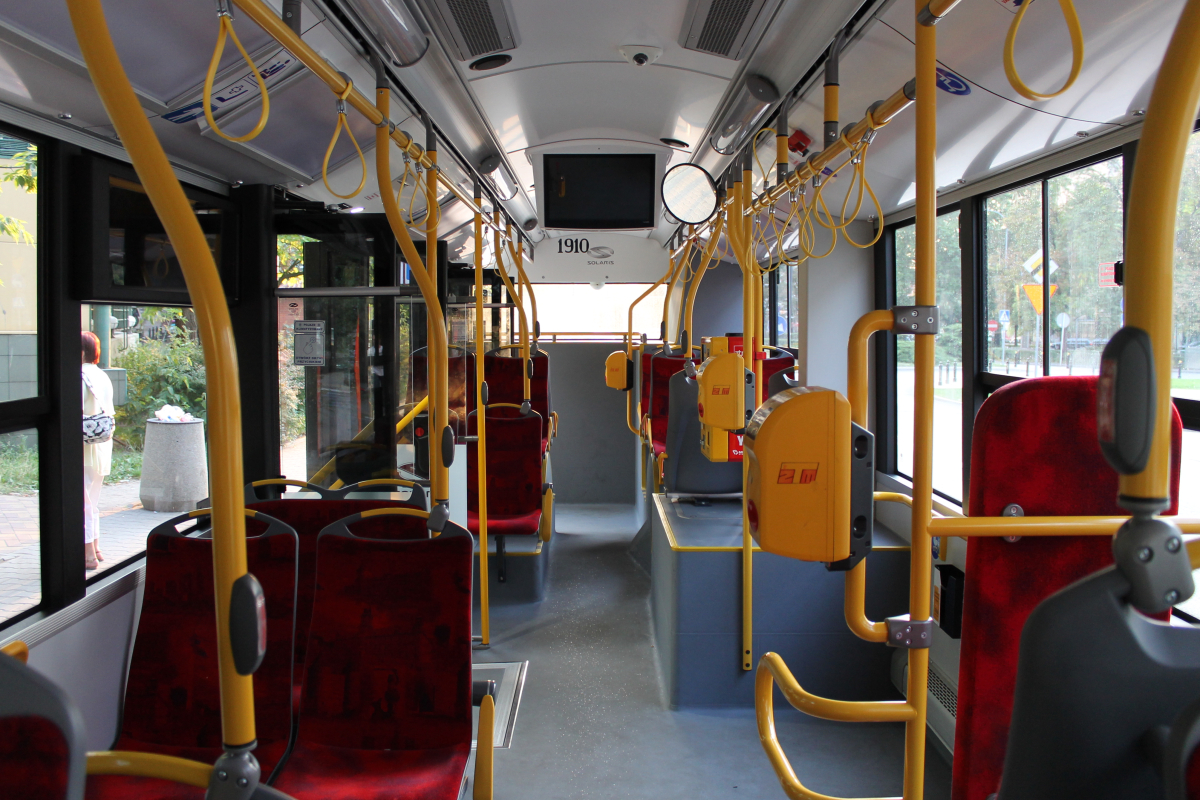
Interior of MZA Warszawa bus

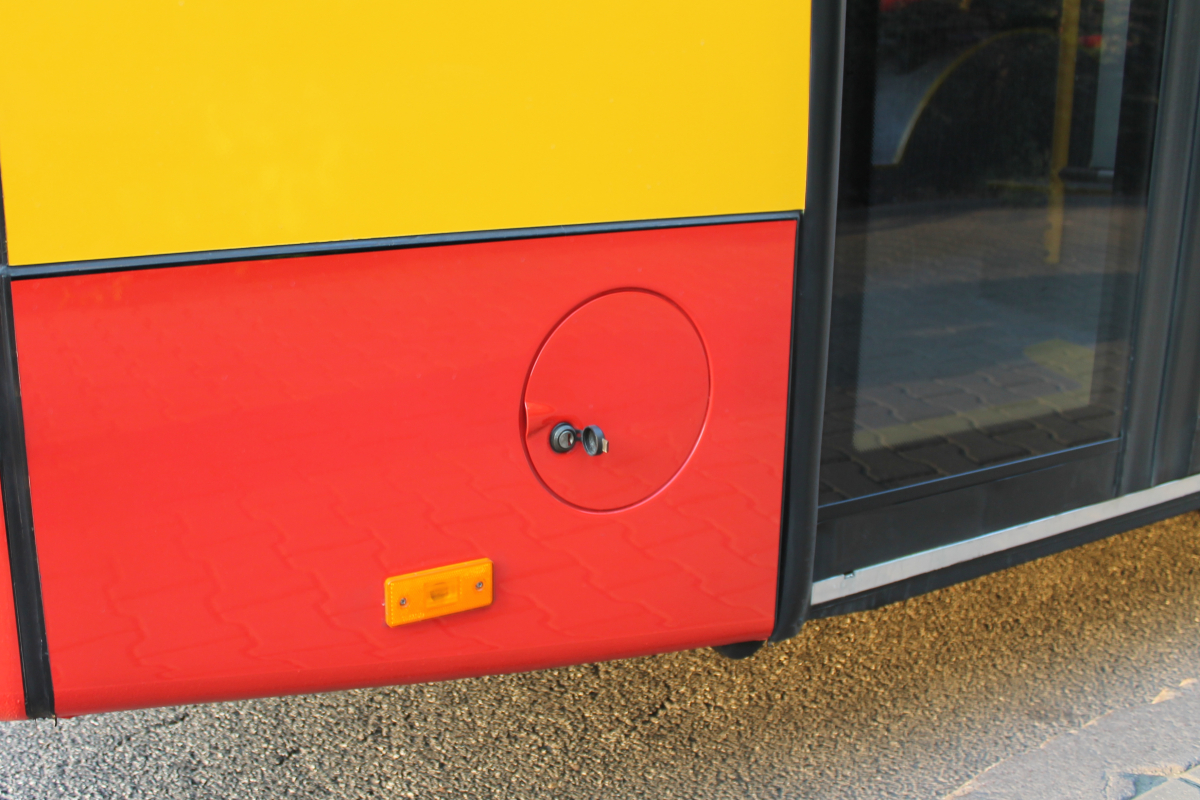
Plug-in charging socket

== Fourth generation ==
In 2014, during the September IAA trade fair, Solaris displayed a diesel model of the Solaris 12 and 18 buses of the new generation (contrary to previous generations, this time instead of using the consecutive number, Solaris preferred the term ‘new generation’). A year later, at the Busworld in Kortrijk, Solaris presented the electric version of the new generation bus. Various configurations can be applied in the new generation vehicles, depending on customer needs, including two wheel hub-mounted ZF AVE 130 motors, each with an output of 125 kilowatts (168 hp) or, optionally, a central engine. The producer enables also the installation of different battery configurations, from 120 to 240 kWh (for Solaris High Energy batteries) and from 58 to 145 kWh (for Solaris High Power batteries) with or without the option of fast charging. The vehicles use either plug-in or pantograph recharging.

The first order for new vehicles was secured even before the official unveiling; it was placed by public transport operator Üstra from Hanover, where three buses in the new design ended up in 2015. In December 2015 tests of the battery bus of Solaris were launched by French operator RATP Paris. The first Polish city to receive a new electric Urbino was Cracow. Later on, the buses made it also to Jaworzno and Ostrów Wielkopolski, as well as Warsaw and Sosnowiec.

An equivalent of the Škoda Perun for the Urbino 12 electric of the new, fourth generation was crafted on the same terms as the previous model. In 2018 on international fair InnoTrans in Berlin German company Voith presented electric bus based on Solaris Urbino 12 electric.

The Solaris Urbino 12 electric was on display at the Hannover Messe, a public transport fair, from 23 until 28 April 2017, on the stand representing Poland's innovation power. During the trade fair, this stand was visited among others by then Polish Prime Minister Beata Szydło and Germany's Chancellor Angela Merkel.

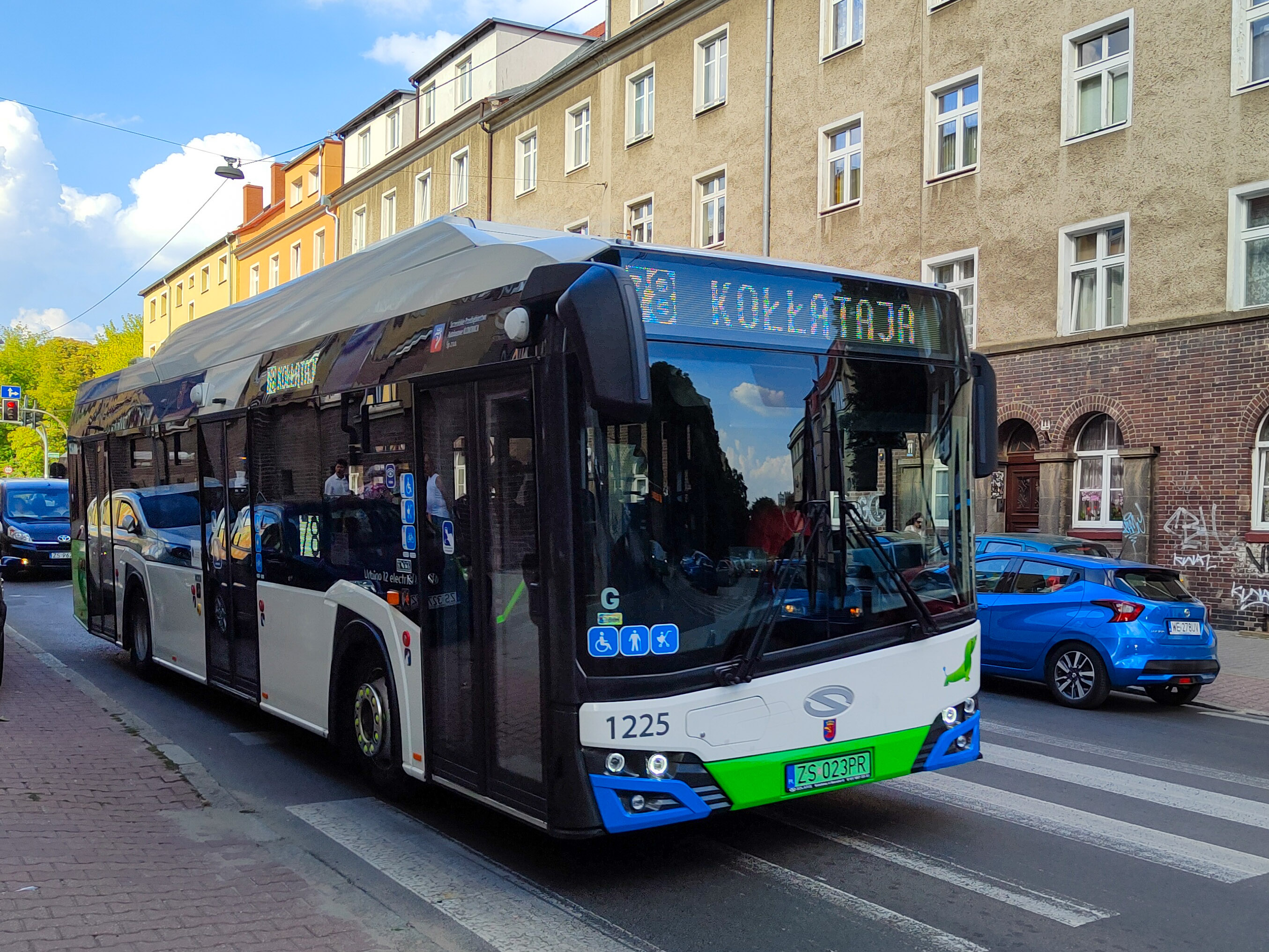
Solaris Urbino 12 electric in Szczecin

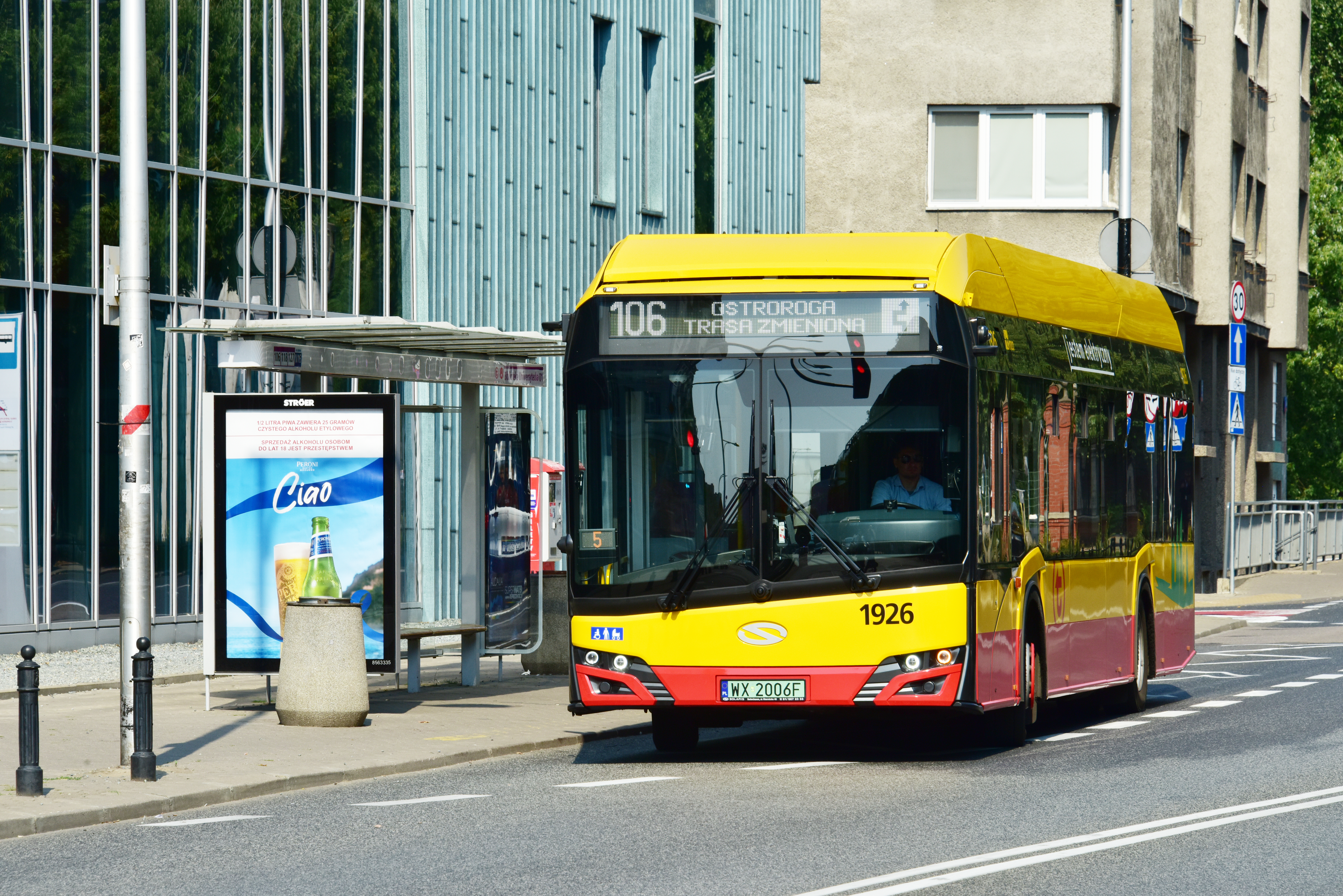
Solaris Urbino 12 electric in Warsaw

Solaris Urbino 12 electric in Tallinn

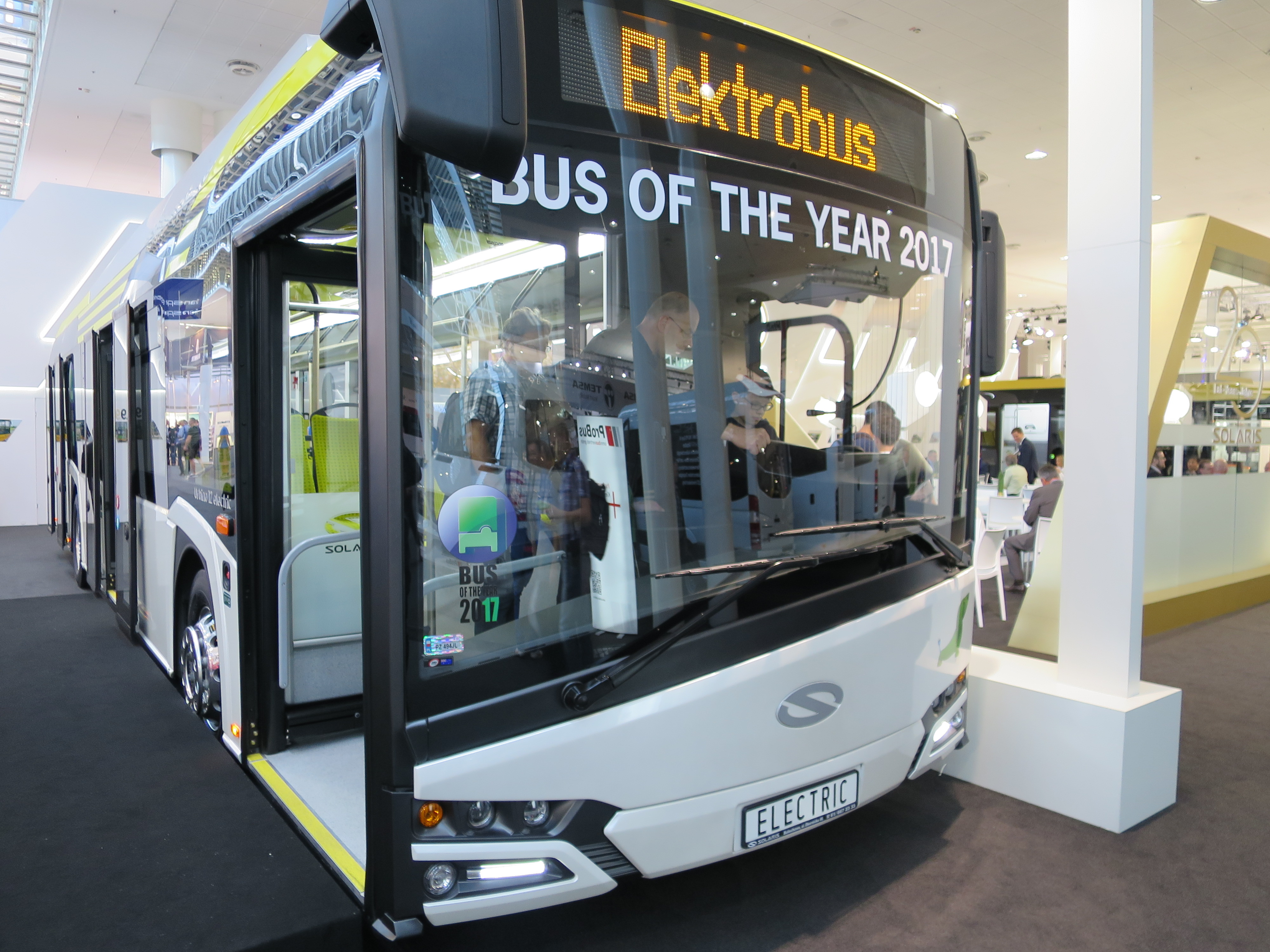
Solaris Urbino 12 electric at the IAA 2016, with its title of Bus of the Year

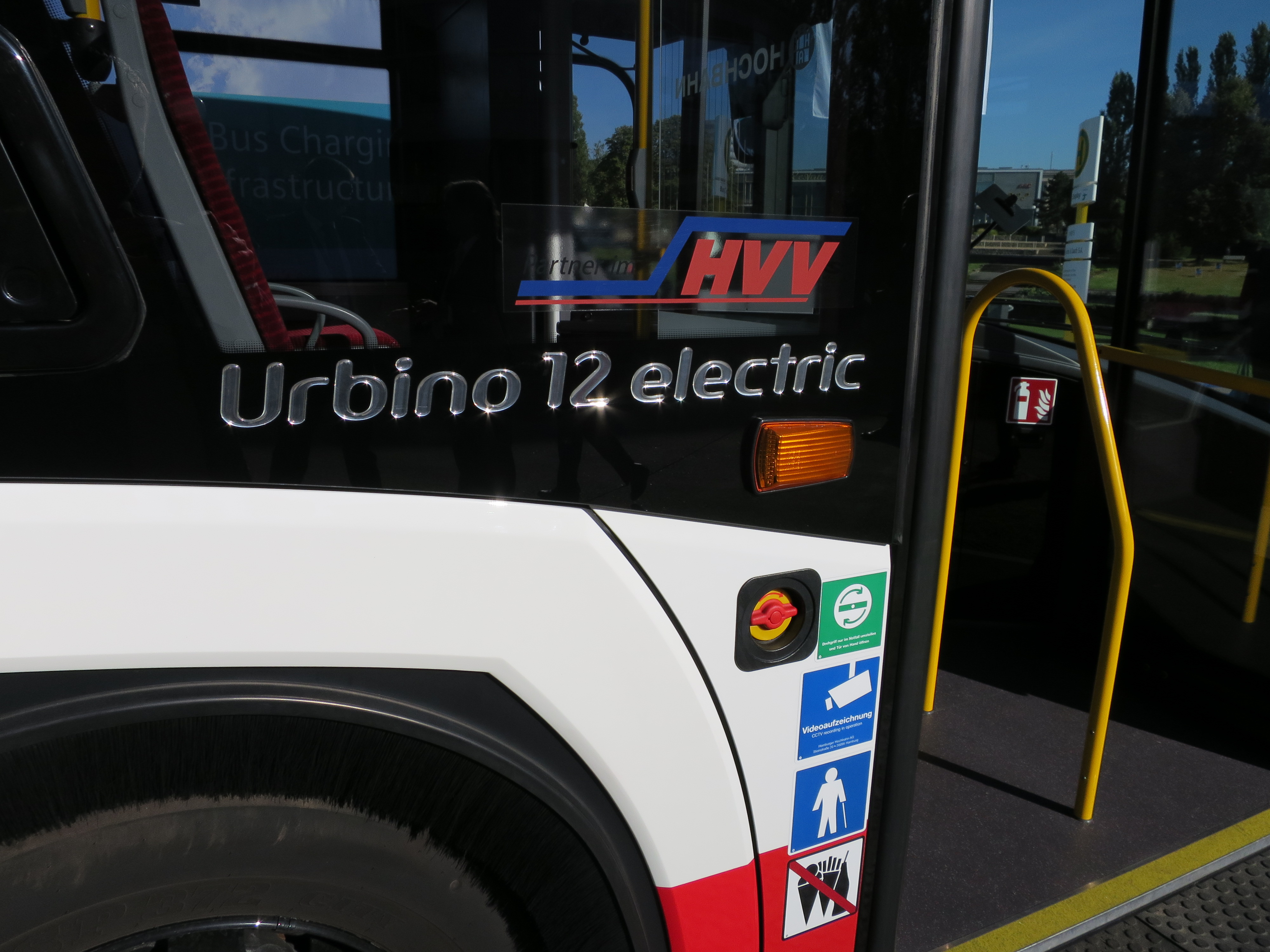
Symbol of the model above front wheel arch

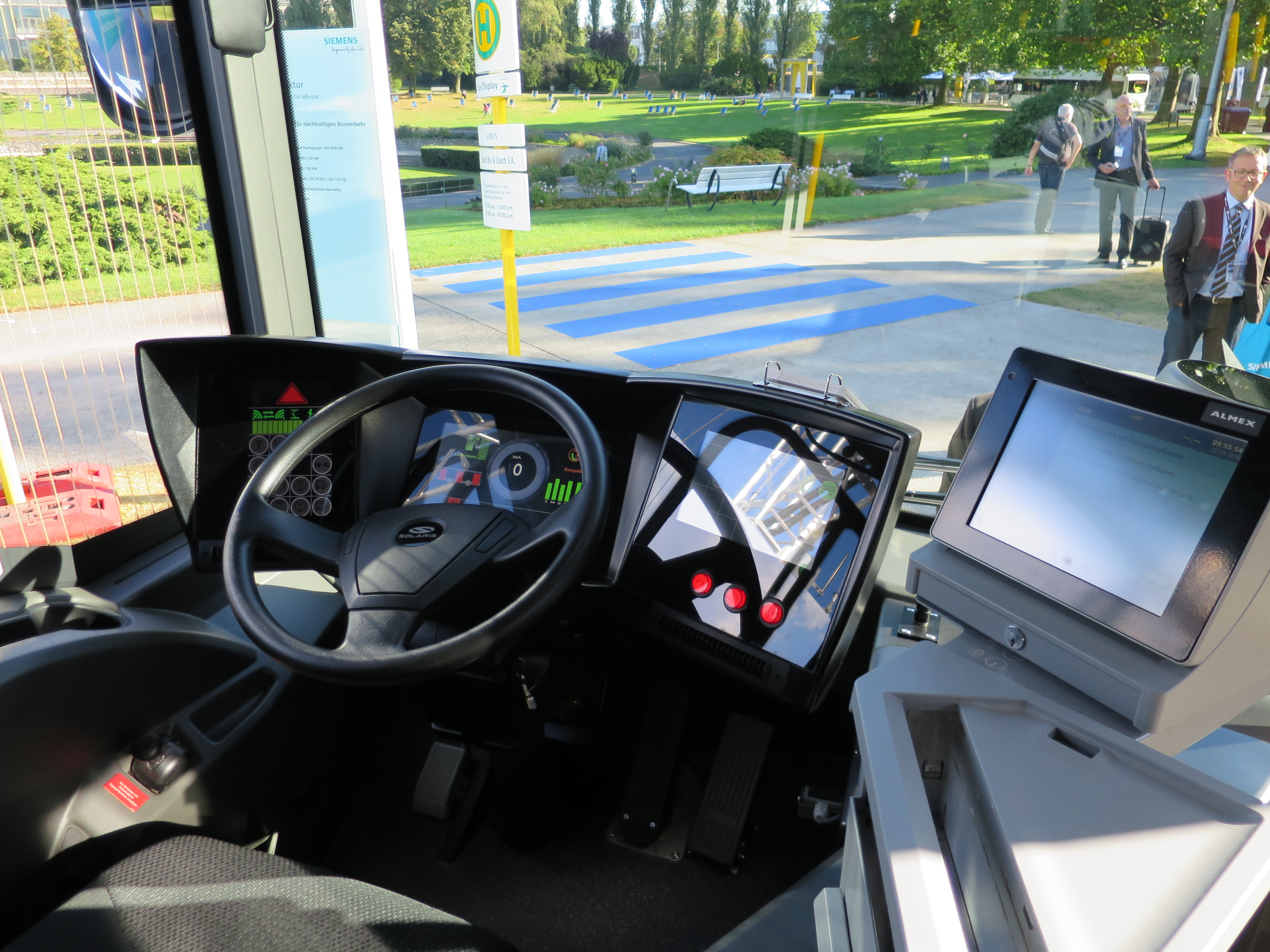
Driver's cabin

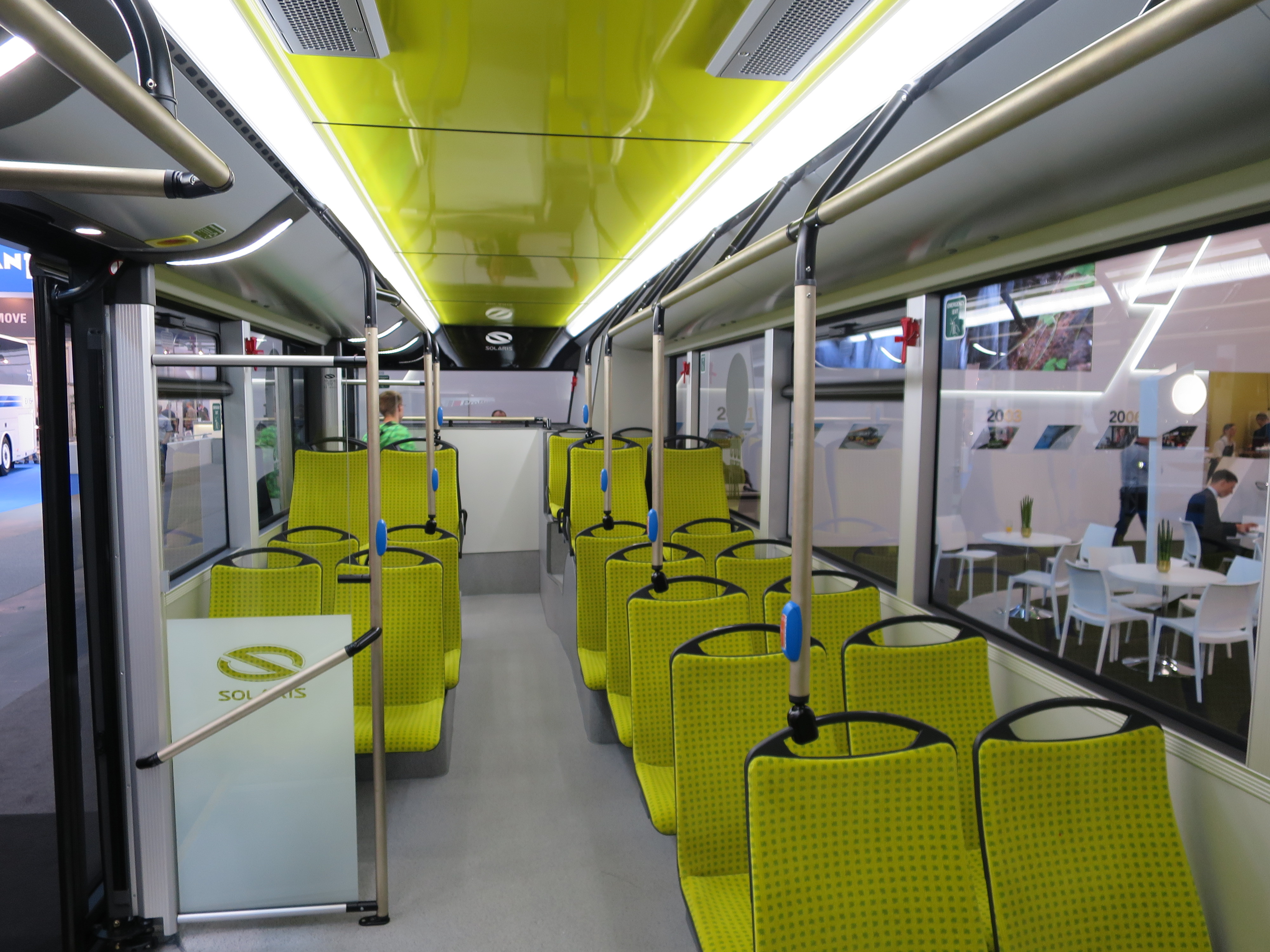
Interior

== Prizes and distinctions ==
=== Bus of the Year ===
In May 2016, Solaris Bus & Coach announced that the Solaris Urbino 12 electric would take part in the Bus Euro Test 2016, an event during which the winner of the title “Bus of the Year 2017” was to be chosen. The vehicle test was held from 30 May until 3 June, on the streets of Brussels. Three other electric vehicles competed against Solaris: Irizar i2e, EbusCo 2.1, VanHool Exqui.City and the CNG fuelled Mercedes-Benz Citaro NGT. According to jurors from 20 European states, the vehicle of the Polish manufacturer scored best. The award was handed out during the IAA Nutzfahrzeuge trade fair in Hanover, in September 2016.

=== Other awards ===
- 2012: The Solaris Urbino 12 electric was named best in the bus category by the jury of the International Fair of Public Transport Transexpo 2012 in Kielce
- 2013: Solaris Urbino 12 electric gets awarded the “Sustainability Prize” by German bus industry magazine “Busplaner”
- 2013: The Solaris Urbino 12 electric, with an automatic system for roof-mounted fast charging, is awarded the Gold Medal of trade fair TRANSEXPO in Kielce in the “Bus” category
- 2017: EBUS Award 2017 for Solaris Urbino 12 electric

== Operators ==
Country	City	Operator	Number of vehicles	Years of delivery
Poland	Jaworzno	PKM Jaworzno	10	2015, 2017
Poland	Cracow	MPK Kraków	17	2015, 2016, 2017
Poland	Warsaw	MZA Warszawa	20	2015, 2018
Poland	Inowrocław	MPK Inowrocław	2	2015
Poland	Sosnowiec	PKM Sosnowiec	3	2018
Poland	Opole	MZK Opole	3/5	2022
Poland	Ostrów Wlkp.	MZK Ostrów Wlkp.	4	2017
Poland	Rzeszów	MPK Rzeszów	10	2018
Poland	Łomianki	Komunikacja Miejska	2	2019
Poland	Bełchatów	MZK Bełchatów	4	2019 2023
Poland	Piła	MZK Piła	5	2022
Poland	Poznań	MPK Poznań	0/6	2020
Poland	Włocławek	MPK Włocławek	0/3	2019
country-wide in total 66 out of 80
Germany	Braunschweig	Braunschweiger Verkehrs	5	2014
Germany	Berlin	BVG	5/20	2015, 2018, 2019
Germany	Hamburg	Hochbahn	7/15	2016, 2018, 2019
Germany	Dresden	DVB	1	2015
Germany	Oberhausen	STOAG	2	2015
Germany	Düsseldorf	Rheinbahn	2	2014
Germany	Hanover	Üstra	3	2015
Germany	Nuremberg	VAG	1	2017
Germany	Fürth	Fürth Verkehr	1	2017
Germany	Lahr	SWAG	1	2018
Germany	Frankfurt	In der City Bus	5	2018
Germany	Munich	Ettenhuber	0/3	2019
Germany	country-wide in total 33 out of 59			
Italy	Milan	ATM Milano	170	2023
Italy	Bergamo	ATB Bergamo	12	2018
Italy	Genova	AMT S.p.A.	30	2022
Italy	country-wide in total 112			
Czechia	Plzeň	PMDP	3 (Škoda)	2015
Czechia	Třinec	Arriva Morava	10 (Škoda)	2017
Czechia	Trutnov	Arriva	0/4 (Škoda)	2019
Czechia	Ostrava	DPO	24	2022
Czechia	country-wide in total 13 out of 17			
Norway	Oslo	Unibuss	2	2017
Norway	Kristiansand	Norgebuss	2	2017
Norway	Oppegård	Boreal Norge	5	2018
Norway	country-wide in total 9			
Hungary	Paks	Paksi Közlekedési Kft.	6	2020
Hungary	country-wide in total 6			
Sweden	Västerås	Västerås Lokaltrafik	1	2014
Sweden	Ystad	Ferry terminal	1	2018
Sweden	country-wide in total 2			
Romania	Cluj-Napoca	CTP Cluj-Napoca	41	2018
Romania	Iași	CTP Iași	20	2022
Romania	Pitești	Publitrans 2000	40	2022
Romania	Sibiu	Tursib	9	2022
Romania	Sighetu Marmației	Mara Nord Transport	7	2022
Romania	Suceava	TPL Suceava	15	2022
Romania	Târgu Mureș	Transport Local	32	2022
Romania	country-wide in total 153 out of 164			
Finland	Tampere	TKL	4	2016
France	Paris	RATP	1	2015
Slovakia	Šaľa	Arriva Nove Zamky	1 (Škoda)	2017
Luxemburg	Bascharage	Sales-Lentz	0/2	2019
Serbia	Novi Sad	JGSP Novi Sad	10	2021, 2023
Latvia	Riga	Rīgas Satiksme	35	2023
Estonia	Tallinn	AS Tallinna Linnatransport	15	2024
