= Ebusco =

Dutch electric bus manufacturer

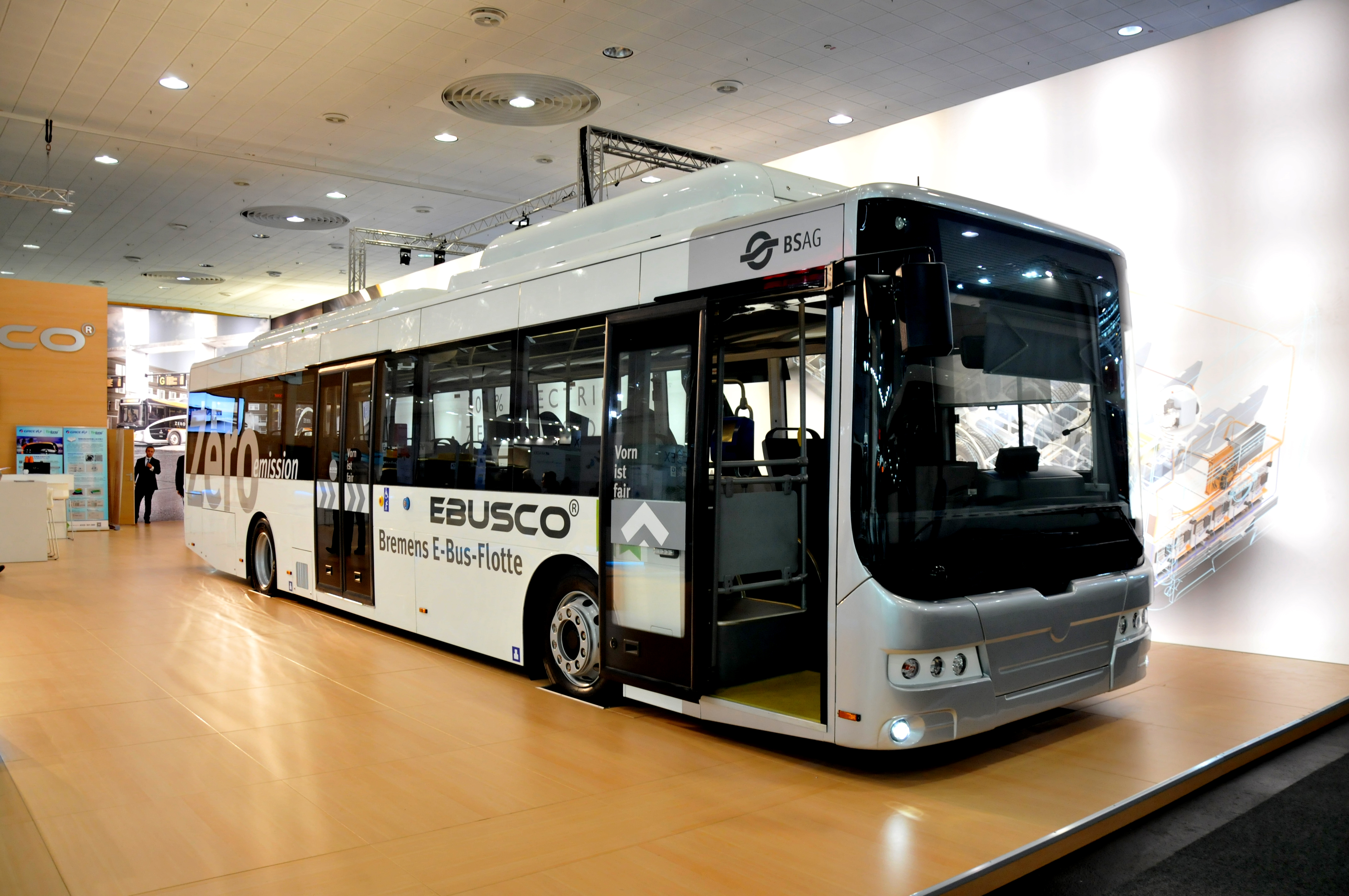
- Ebusco 2.0 for Bremen
- Traded as: Euronext Amsterdam: EBUS
- ISIN: NL0015000CZ2
- Industry: Electric buses
- Founded: 27 April 2012; 14 years ago
- Key people: Christian Schreyer (CEO)
- Revenue: €100 million (2020)
- Number of employees: 214
- Website: www.ebusco.com

Ebusco is a Dutch manufacturer of electric buses and accompanying charging infrastructure.

== History ==
=== 2010s: Foundation and relocation ===
Ebusco was founded in 2012 in Helmond. The vehicle workshop and the office were located in two different neighbourhoods of the city about 3 kilometres apart. In September 2018, Ebusco moved to Deurne, where it had acquired a production hall of more than 7,000 m^{2} and sufficient office space.

=== 2020s: Euronext and near bankruptcy ===
Since 22 October 2021, Ebusco has been listed on the Euronext in Amsterdam. The major shareholder is the company's founder, Peter Bijvelds. After the IPO in October 2021, Bijvelds held 35.4% of the shares. ING Group was the next largest shareholder with an equity interest of 21%.

In 2024 the company failed to deliver 59 buses to Qbuzz by the agreed delivery date. Spare parts for buses already in service were also not be delivered, causing 10% of Qbuzz buses to be out of service. Qbuzz demanded payment of the previously agreed compensation for late delivery . After Ebusco failed to pay the compensation, Qbuzz seized €1.2 million of Ebusco's bank accounts, which meant that Ebusco was unable to pay its staff's salaries. In October 2024 Ebusco announced cutbacks in an attempt to avoid bankruptcy, with €33 million in debt.

In 2026 it is close to collapse after more delivery goals were not met, an order of 23 buses canceled, and losses continue.

== Models ==
Ebusco 1.0 was produced in 2012. The buses were used for test drives in various European cities.

Ebusco 2.0 was a 12 m long low-floor bus. It was presented to the public for the first time at the IAA Commercial Vehicles 2014 in Hanover and had a battery with an energy content of 242 kWh.

Ebusco 2.1 is also a 12 m long bus. The first vehicle was delivered in April 2017. Its battery has an energy content of 311 kWh.

Ebusco 2.2 has been available since 2018 and is produced in three different variants: as LF (Low Floor) with three doors, LE (Low Entry) with two doors both 12 m (39.4 ft) long and an articulated type 18 m (59.1 ft) long.

Ebusco 3.0 was presented at Busworld 2019, and was 33% lighter than its predecessor, the Ebusco 2.2, and could drive up to 500 kilometres on battery charge.

== Awards ==
- Automotive Innovation Award 2021
- JEC Composites Innovation Award: Automotive & Road Transportation Structural 2021
- Automotive Brand Contest (ABC) – German Design Council 2020
- Top 250 Scale ups – Erasmus 2020
- Busworld Innovation Label – Busworld 2019
- Busworld Ecology Label – Busworld 2015
- Busworld Ecology Label – Busworld 2013
