= Van Hool =

Belgian bus, coach and trailer manufacturer

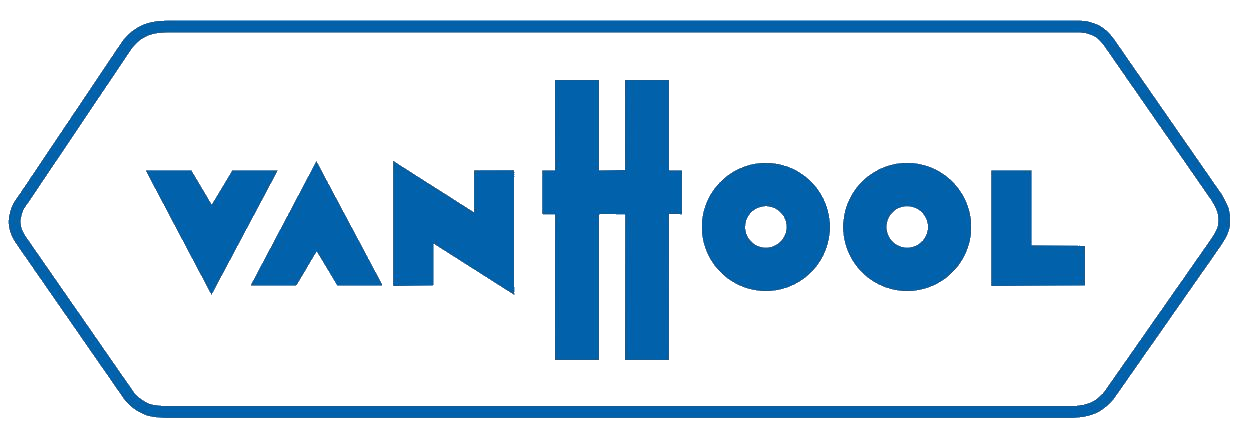
- Type: Private (1947-2024); Subsidiary (2024-present)
- Industry: Automotive manufacture; Automotive engineering
- Founded: 1947
- Fate: Bankruptcy and taken over by VDL & Schmitz Cargobull
- Headquarters: Koningshooikt, Belgium
- Key people: Bernard Van Hool (founder); Filip Van Hool (CEO); Marc Zwaaneveld (co-CEO)
- Products: Bus; Coach; Semi-trailers
- Parent: VDL Groep, VDL Bus, and Coach
- Subsidiaries: Van Hool USA; Van Hool North Macedonia ABC Companies
- Website: Official website

VDL-Van Hool ([vɑn ˈɦoːl]) (formerly known as Van Hool NV) is a Belgian coachbuilder and manufacturer of buses, coaches, trolleybuses, and trailers.

Most of the buses and coaches are built entirely by Van Hool, with engines and axles sourced from Caterpillar, Cummins, DAF and MAN and gearboxes from ZF or Voith. Some production involved building bus and coach bodies on separate bus chassis from manufacturers such as Volvo and Scania.

Worldwide, Van Hool employed 4,500 people and manufactured more than 1,700 buses and coaches (bodyworks and complete vehicles combined) and 5,000 trailers each year. It sold an average of 600 coaches annually in the United States.

Van Hool filed for bankruptcy on Friday, 5 April 2024, and was declared bankrupt the following Monday (8 April 2024) by the Commercial Court of Belgium. On 10 April 2024, it was announced that Van Hool's trustees had accepted a takeover bid from Netherlands-based bus manufacturer VDL and Germany-based semi-trailer manufacturer Schmitz Cargobull.

== History ==
Bernard Van Hool (1902–1974) was a farmer in Koningshooikt, near Lier, Belgium; he and wife Bertha Van Asch had eight sons and two daughters. Bernard built his own bus to take workers to his farm in Koningshooikt, and founded the company in 1947 in response to other farmers asking for similar vehicles. The company was a family business: of the 22 initial employees, five were related to Bernard, including his brother-in-law and his four eldest sons; it changed its name in 1954 to Van Hool en Zonen ("and Sons").

In the early years, Van Hool was a bus coachbuilder using motor vehicle chassis from other companies; it introduced serial production and exported their products all over Europe. The company has also been active on the North American market since the mid 1980s.

=== Van Hool-Fiat ===
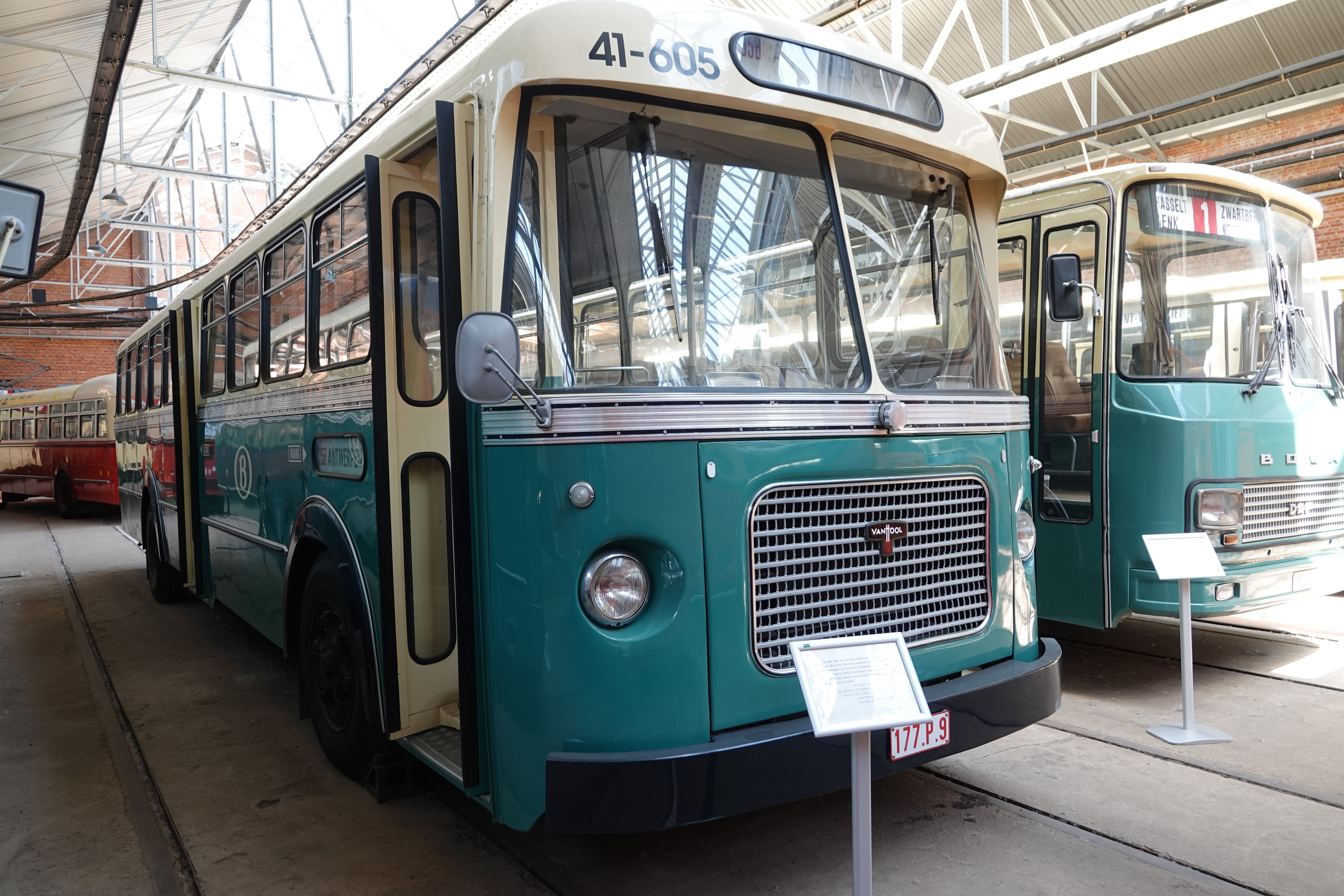
Preserved VanHool-Fiat 682 in VlaTAM (2022)

On February 15, 1957, Van Hool signed a commercial agreement with Fiat; Van Hool would incorporate Fiat engines and other mechanical components (gearboxes, axles, steering) in its vehicles. It developed from a coachbuilder to a Belgian manufacturer of integral buses and coaches, known as Van Hool-Fiat. Alongside these activities, the company continued as a coachbuilder, enabling further expansion.

In August 1958, a year and a half after the agreement with Fiat was signed, the 100th Van Hool-Fiat was delivered, and by July 1961, the figure had exceeded 500. The co-operation agreement with Fiat was terminated in 1981.

=== Global expansion ===
Bernard van Hool retired from daily management in 1969 and died in 1974. Between 1974 and 1978 Van Hool and Dundalk-based coachbuilders Thomas McArdle entered into a partnership known as Van Hool McArdle to take over the bus building factory of CIÉ at Spa Road, Dublin, Ireland. The factory mainly built buses for CIÉ in Ireland plus some for export to the UK. The factory was then closed leaving the Republic of Ireland without a bus manufacturer for several years.

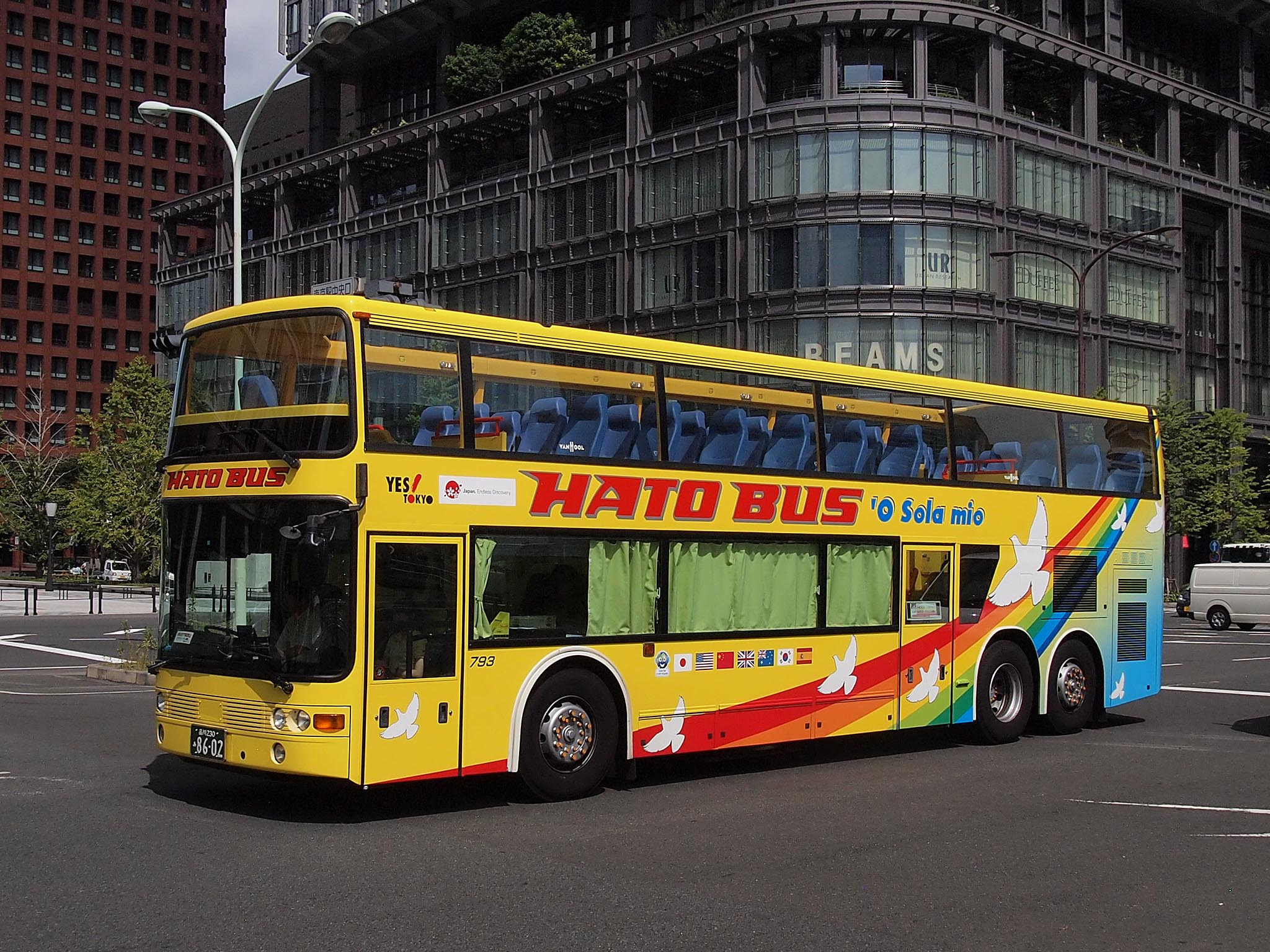
Hato Bus TD824 Astromega in Japan (2012)

Van Hool entered the Japanese market in the early-1980s when the Meitetsu Group imported several Astromega double-decker buses for use as highway buses, followed by Hato Bus who imported two Astromegas in 1997. Since 2016, Van Hool and Scania have jointly developed and produced the TDX24 Astromega double-decker highway bus (also marketed as the J-InterCity DD) solely for the Japanese market, as the spiritual successor to the Mitsubishi Fuso Aero King which was discontinued six years earlier.

In 1990, Van Hool purchased the coachbuilding business of LAG Manufacturing in Belgium and continued producing their EOS models for about ten years.

=== Bankruptcy and acquisition ===
Crisis manager Marc Zwaaneveld was brought into the company in early 2024 as co-CEO alongside Filip Van Hool. As part of a reorganization plan, Zwaaneveld announced that Van Hool would discontinue transit bus production on March 11 and shift production to North Macedonia. However, the family could not agree on implementation; in an interview later that month with De Standaard, he said bankruptcy was unavoidable. Van Hool filed for bankruptcy on Friday, 5 April 2024 and was declared bankrupt the following Monday (8 April 2024) by the Commercial Court of Belgium, with production stopping and putting 1550 jobs at risk.

On 10 April 2024, it was announced that Van Hool's trustees had accepted a takeover bid from Netherlands-based bus manufacturer VDL and Germany-based semi-trailer manufacturer Schmitz Cargobull.

In June 2026, it was announced that Dutch transport company G.A. Den Otter Trucks purchased the remaining 30 hectares of Van Hool grounds.

== Product range (Europe) ==
In Europe, Van Hool has a broad range of coaches, though all designs share similar looks and are based on the same platform, the TX. The same philosophy is used on the transit bus range, the A-series. In recent years, the company has been focusing on new propulsion technologies, introducing fuel-cell hybrid buses as well as diesel-electric hybrids.

=== Previous products ===
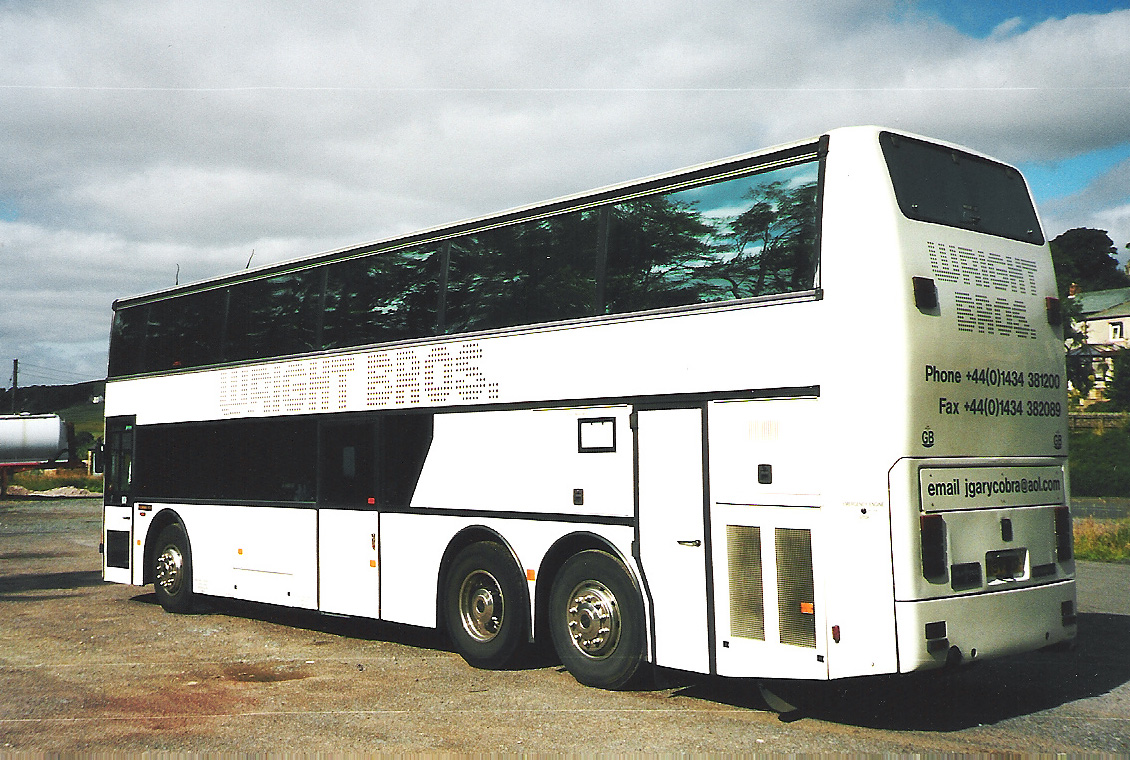
A British spec double deck Van Hool coach

==== T8 series touring coach ====
The T8 platform was introduced in 1979. The body was based on the Alizee bodywork that had been launched the previous year. Over the course of several years, a range of touring coaches were developed based on this platform, each distinguished by a number and a name, following a clear naming convention. For example, in "TD824 Astromega":

- T = Touringcar (touring coach)
- D = Dubbeldek (double deck)
- 8 = Part of the T8 series
- 24 = theoretical maximum number of seat rows
- Astromega = name of the double deck integrals

In 1991, an updated "T8 New Look" was introduced, called the T9 in its North American version. Production was ended in the late 1990s, following the introduction of the new (European) T9 platform.

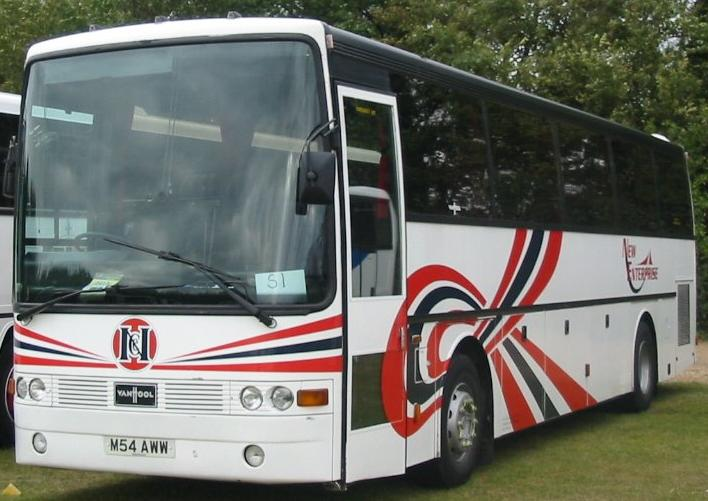
New Enterprise Coaches Van Hool Alizée HE-II body on a Scania K113CRB

Model names used during the T8's production run included:

- Alicron = integral single deck coach (standard height)
- Acron = integral single deck coach (high floor)
- Astron = integral single deck (formerly interdeck) coach (3.88 m or 12 ft 8 3/4 inhigh, two-axle, mid engine, small lower saloon at rear)
- Alizee = short length integral single deck coach, single deck coach body on other manufacturers' chassis
- Alligator = integral articulated single deck coach
- Altano = integral interdeck coach (low driving position and passenger seating above driver)
- Aragon = single deck coach body built by Van Hool España on other manufacturers' chassis
- Astral = interdeck coach body on mid-engined Volvo B10M chassis (two- or three-axle, small lower saloon at rear)
- Astrobel = double deck coach body on other manufacturers' chassis (4 m or 13 ft 1 1/2 in high, three-axle, rear engine). A one-off extra-high body was also built on a mid-engined Volvo B10MT chassis for use in Britain.
- Amarant = integral double deck coach (3.88 m or 12 ft 8 3/4 in high, two-axle, rear engine)
- Astromega = integral double deck coach (4 m or 13 ft 1 1/2 in high, three-axle, rear engine)

==== A-series transit bus ====
AGG300 bi-articulated bus

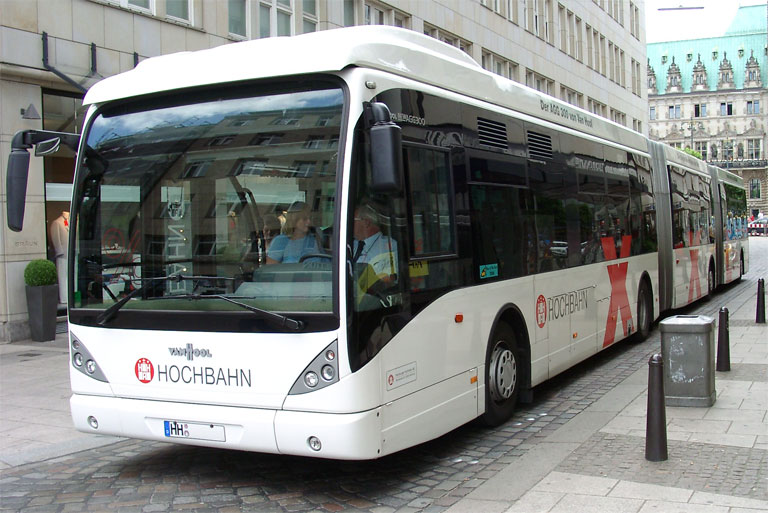
Front

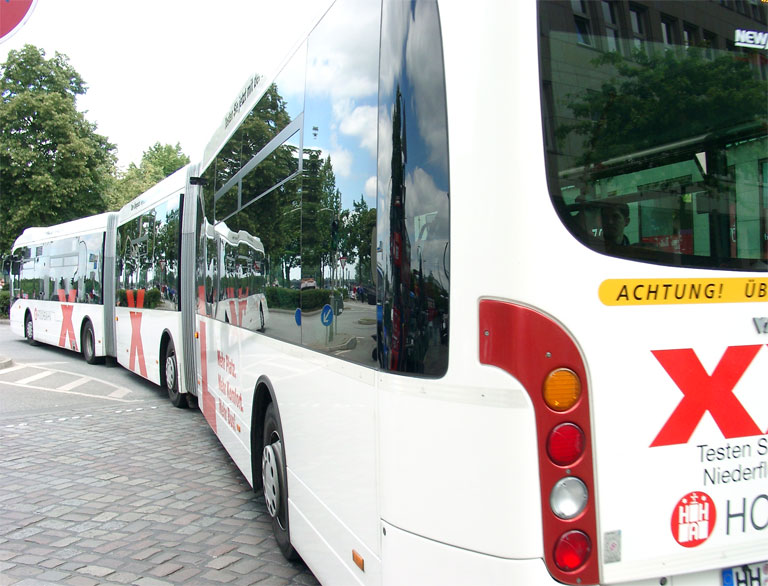
Rear

In the 1980s, European countries started to move away from standard bus designs, leaving the design of transit buses to the manufacturers. Van Hool's response was the development of the A-series transit buses. The first member, the A500, was introduced in 1985. A complete family would follow, again following a clear naming convention. For example, in 'AG500':

- A = Autobus (transit bus)
- G = Geleed (articulated)
- 500 = height of the floor, in millimeters

Production of the A-series continued into the early 21st century, when it was replaced by the newA-series.

=== Current products ===
==== T9 series touring coaches ====
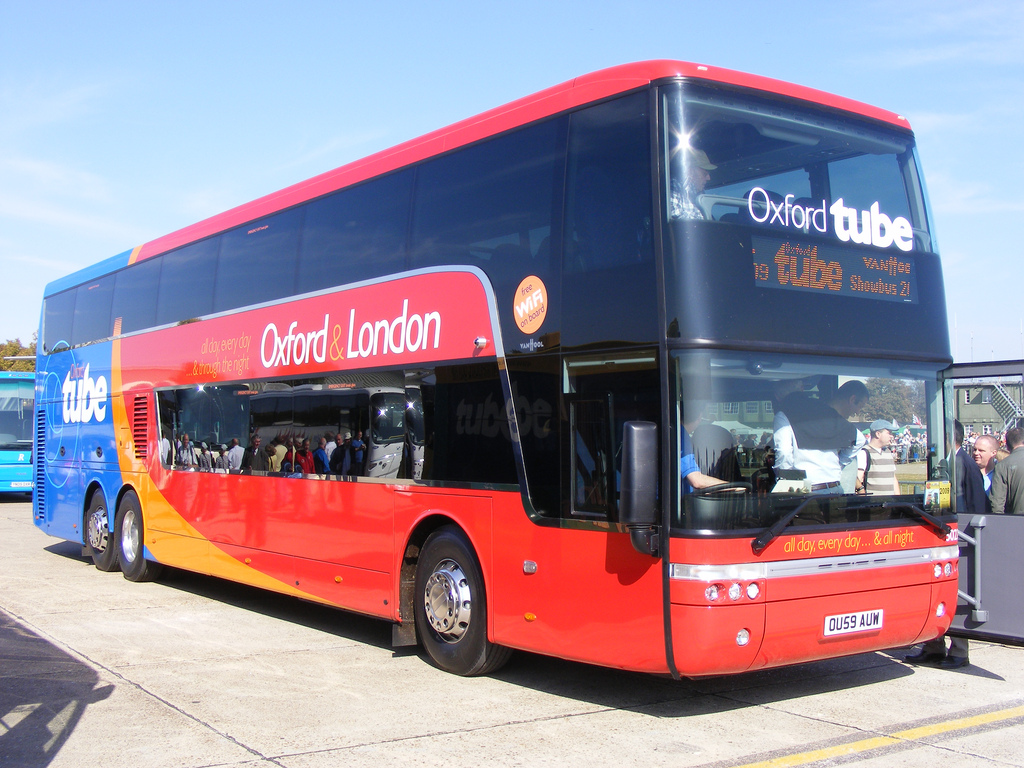
Oxford Tube Van Hool Astromega TD927 coach

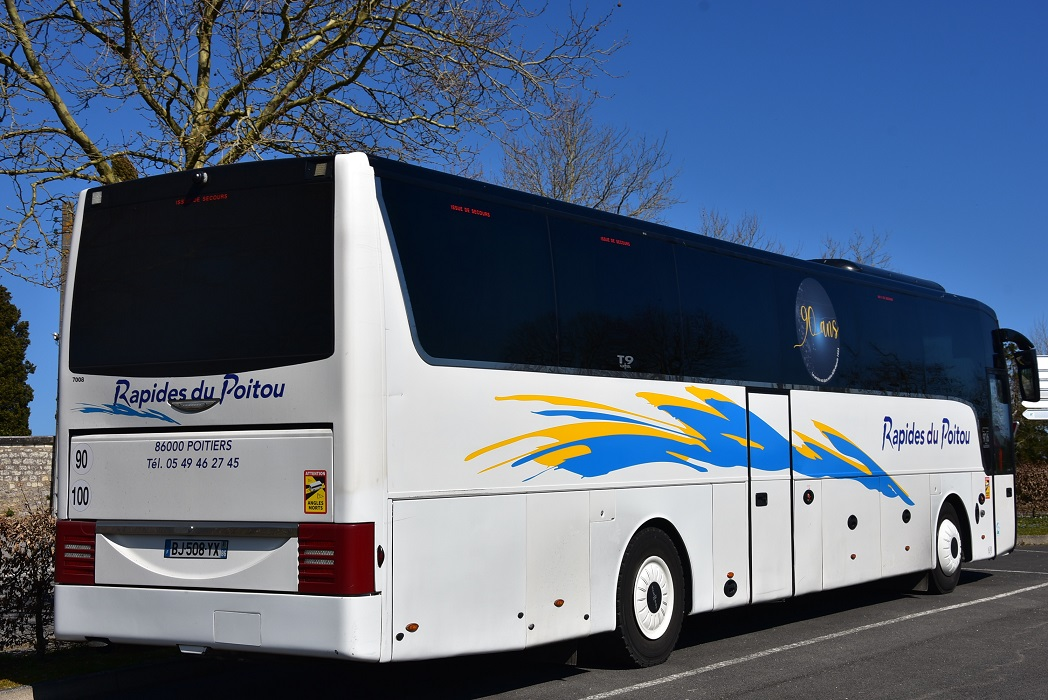
Van Hool T916 Alicron (2010), France

The T9 series was launched in 1995. It included a completely new body design and many other changes. The same philosophy as with the T8 was applied: one platform, many different versions. Also, the naming convention was retained. Over the years, many new variants have been developed. Different models (all available in at least two lengths, see 'products' below) include the Atlino and Atlon, with different floor heights, the Alicron, Acron and Astron, standard touring coaches with different heights and thus different luggage space, the Altano, which has an underfloor cockpit, the Astronef, which features a sloping theatre-style floor, and the double deck Astromega.

The T9 body is available on chassis by Scania, Volvo, and VDL, though only in Sweden and the British Isles. These motorcoaches are referred to as Alizee (single deck) and Astrobel (double deck).

(The European T9 series should not be confused with the T9 series in the United States market, which corresponds with the European T8 New Look.)

==== TX series touring coaches ====
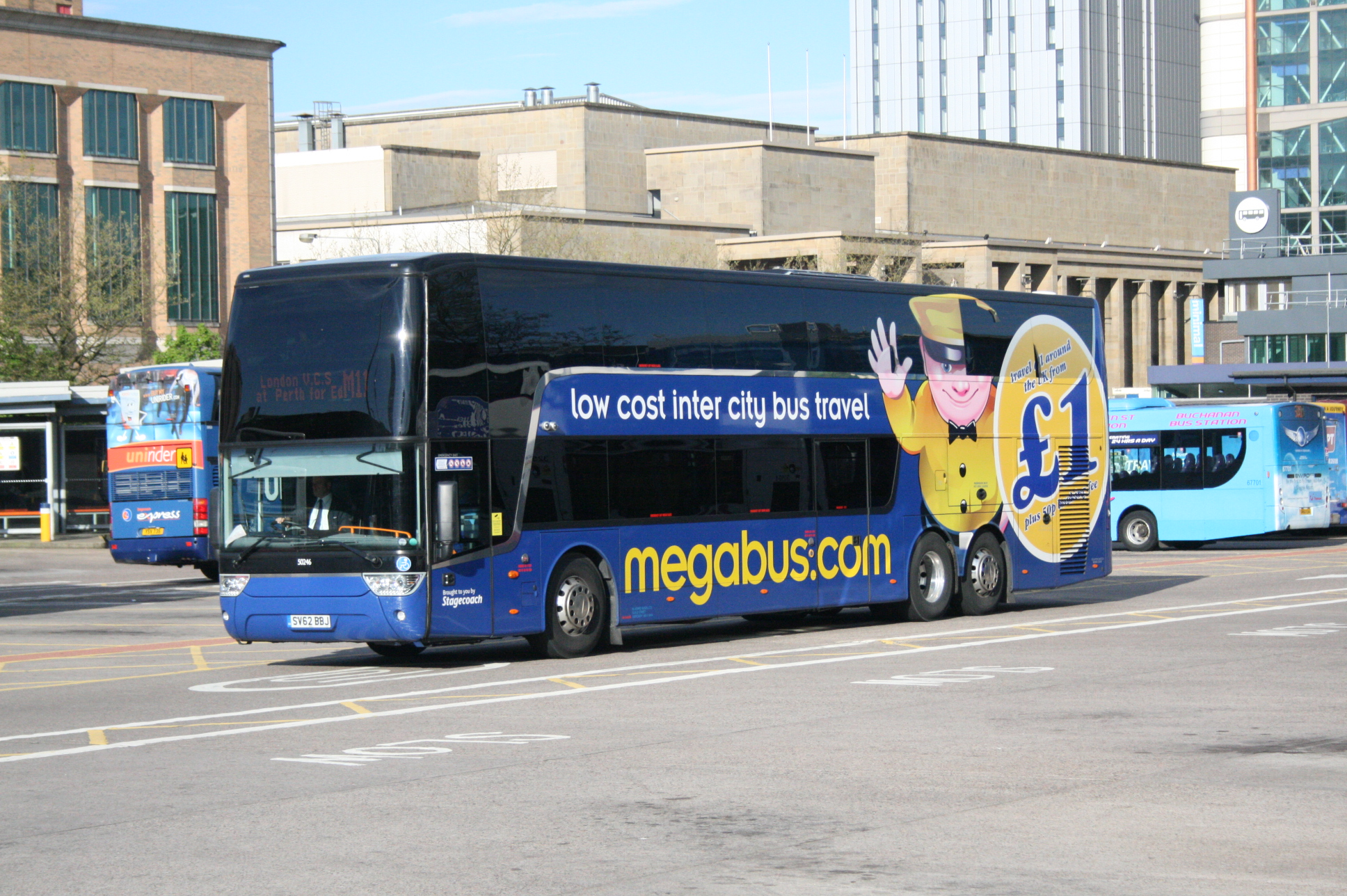
A Megabus Van Hool TDX27 Astromega at Buchanan bus station

At Busworld 2011 in Kortrijk, Belgium, Van Hool presented the successor to the T9 series. The new series is called TX.

==== newA series transit buses ====
In 2001, Van Hool introduced the newA series transit buses, replacing the A series. It featured a new body design and many other changes. A complete family was developed, with different length and configurations.

==== ExquiCity BRT solution ====
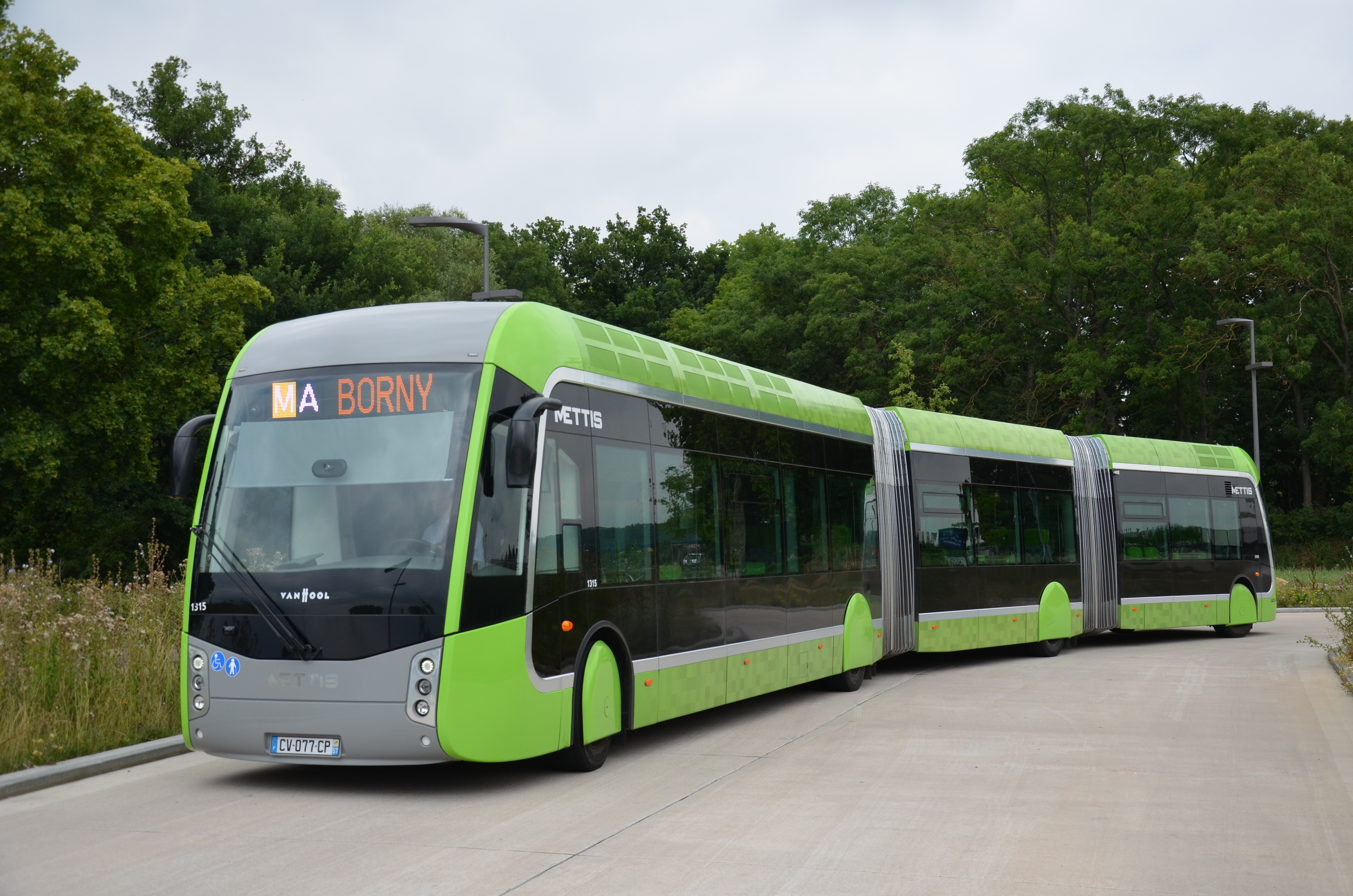
A double-articulated ExquiCity 24 Mettis at Metz

In April 2011, Van Hool launched the ExquiCity platform, aimed specifically at the BRT market. The bus has the styling and comfort of a tram, with the flexibility and cost of a bus. The ExquiCity was launched in two lengths, the single-articulated ExquiCity 18 and the double-articulated ExquiCity 24. Both are available as trolley buses, diesel-electric hybrids, fuel-cell hybrids or full-electric buses.

First orders were placed by the Italian city of Parma (ExquiCity 18 trolley) and the French city of Metz (ExquiCity 24 diesel electric hybrid). A mock-up was presented at the UITP Congress in Dubai. A fleet of ExquiCity 18s commenced service in Belfast, Northern Ireland on 3 September 2018 delivering the bus rapid transit service marketed under the name Glider.

==== EX series touring coaches ====
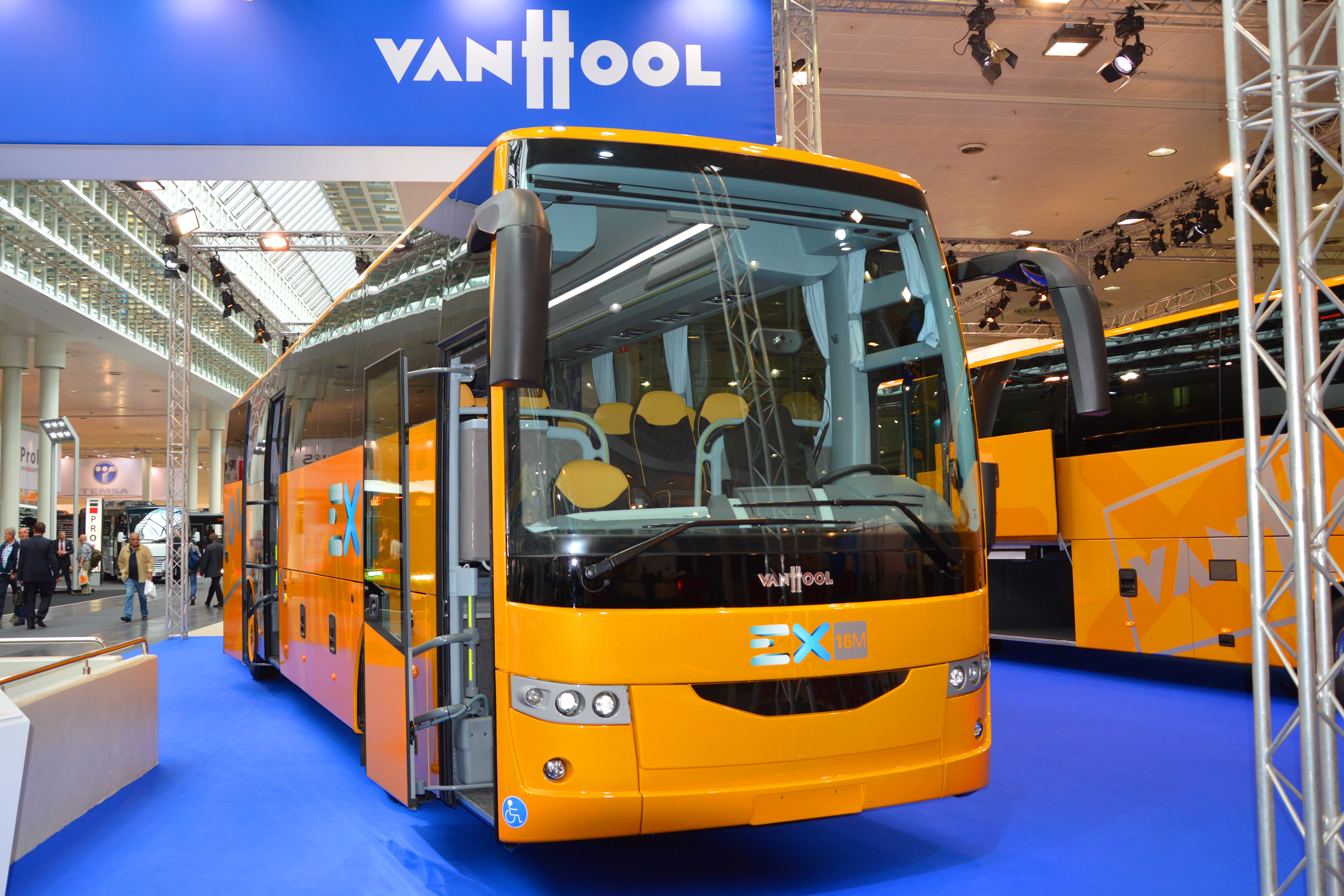
A Van Hool EX16M produced in North Macedonia. Shown at the IAA 2014.

At the Internationale Automobil-Ausstellung 2014 in Hanover, Germany, Van Hool presented the new EX series of touring coaches for the European market. It is produced in the Van Hool factory in Skopje, the capital of the North Macedonia.

== Product range (North America) ==
Due to the Buy America Act of 1982, only coach buses were introduced in the United States starting in 1987, and were aimed at the private and charter bus market. Low floor transit coaches by Van Hool were not introduced until 2002. Currently, Van Hool has four separate product lines: the TX series deluxe touring coaches, the CX series touring coaches, the TD925 and TDX double-decker coach, and the A-series transit buses. Van Hool's exclusive dealer in North America is ABC Companies.

In 2018, Van Hool Headquarters announced plans to construct a new manufacturing facility in Morristown, Tennessee designed to produce public transit buses. The facility was planned to open in 2020, and employ 600 workers, capable of making approximately 400 buses annually. In 2022, the planned factory was delayed until 2025, with Van Hool citing the downturn in the market for tour buses due to the global COVID-19 pandemic. However, construction never began and in April 2024, Van Hool declared bankruptcy and was acquired by VDL Groep and GRW.

=== Discontinued products ===
==== T8 series touring coach ====
The T815 was first introduced to the United States market in 1987. Later subsequent models are collectively known as the T8 series. The earliest use Cummins L10 diesels. Later versions use Cummins M11 diesels. It was available in 30,-40-and-45-foot (9.14, 12.19 and 13.72 m) length versions.

==== T9 series touring coach ====
T9 series are almost identical to the T8 series visually, and are largely identical mechanically as well, except for incremental updates. Later models in the T9 series have larger suspension airbags, as well as front disc brakes instead of drum brakes. Van Hool's VIN consider T8 and T9 to be the same family. It was available as 40-foot (12.2 m) T940 or extended 45-foot (13.7 m) T945 versions.

==== A3 transit bus series ====
Van Hool and ABC partnered with AC Transit (Alameda and Contra Costa counties, California) to demonstrate the A3 series as a future transit alternative in 2002. The AG300 is an articulated 60-foot (18.3 m) bus, while the A330 is a 40-foot (12.2 m) bus. The A330 and AG300 low floor transit coaches formally entered service in AC Transit's fleet in June 2003. AC Transit has over 290 Van Hool buses either in its fleet or on order as of August 2016.

Van Hool was building sixteen hydrogen fuel cell buses for the United States as of August 2009. These buses are powered by fuel cells from UTC Power and lithium batteries from EnerDell. Twelve of the buses are being purchased by AC Transit and four by CT Transit of Hartford, Connecticut. This project is unusual in that the buses have been designed from the ground up as fuel cell buses and are designed, built, and integrated by a single manufacturer.

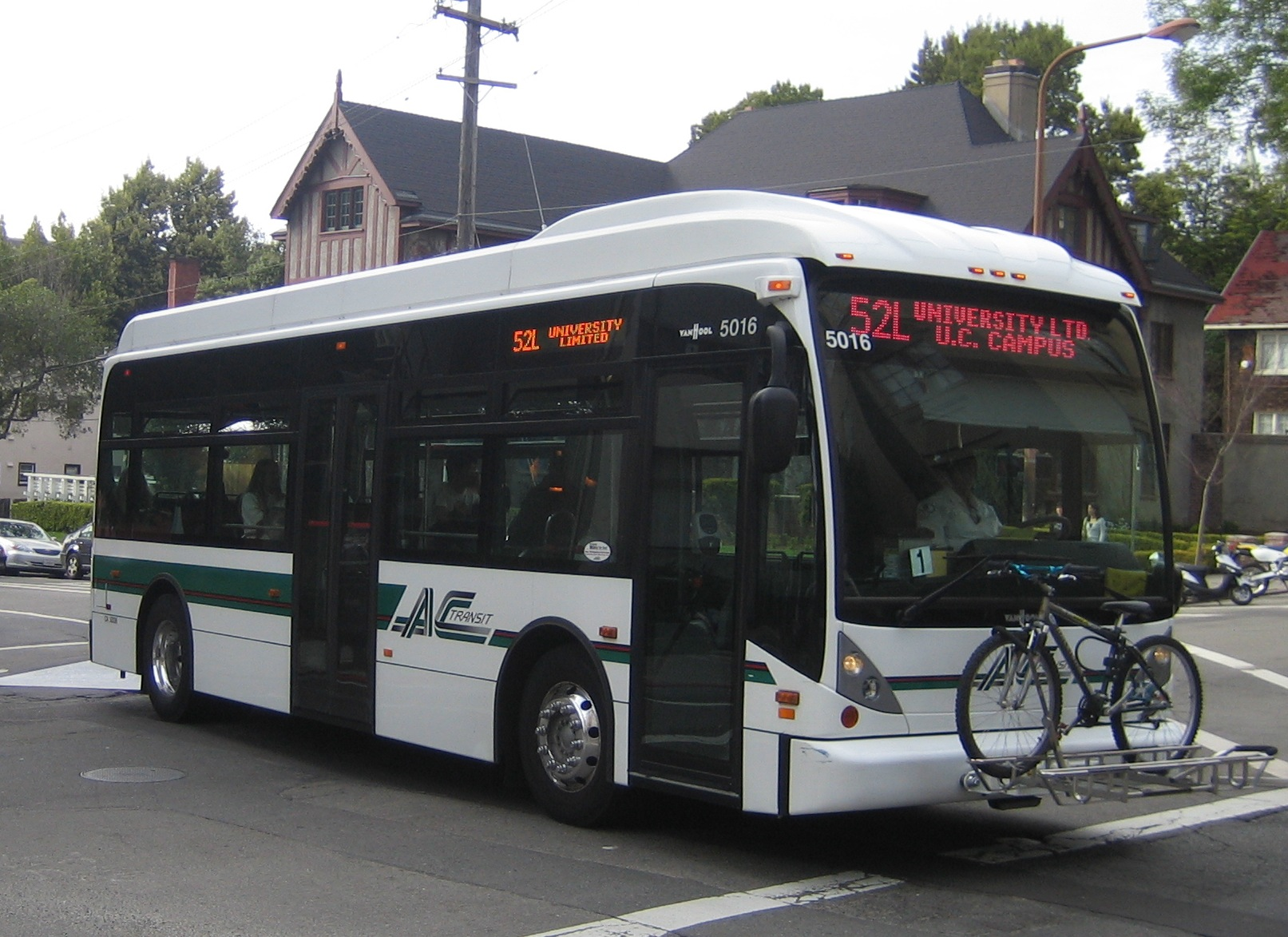
An AC Transit 30-foot (9.1 m) Van Hool A300K bus

In 2008, AC Transit took delivery of a fleet of new model A300L 40-foot (12.2 m) buses. These buses are unique in the United States market, as they have their engines mounted between the front and rear axles in an attempt to improve the ride quality. This bus is a longer version of the previously introduced 30-foot (9.1 m) A300K (K stands for kort, "short" in Dutch and L for lang, "long"). A survey of AC Transit riders found that they approved of the design and quality of the new buses.

Utah Transit Authority (based in Salt Lake City) purchased ten A300L 40-foot (12.2 m) buses in 2008, followed by four more in 2009, for its MAX bus rapid transit system. These buses differ from AC Transit's A300Ls as they have three doors and are equipped for cold weather and high altitude operations.

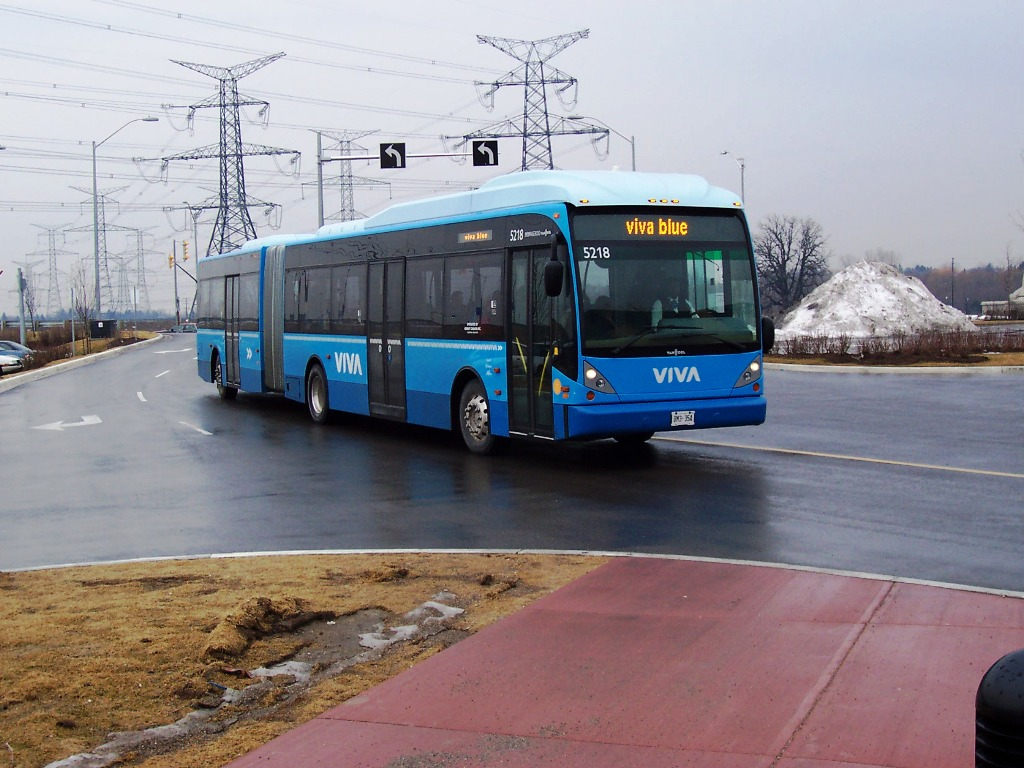
A Van Hool single articulated bus with North American specifications operated by York Region Transit north of Toronto, Ontario, Canada

York Region Transit (north of Toronto, Ontario) uses the A330 and AG300 buses on its Viva routes, though the A330 buses are being transferred to the conventional YRT service as more Nova LFX buses arrive for the Viva services. The Réseau de transport de Longueuil (south of Montreal, Quebec) also used the AG300 buses, and was the first to use Van Hool transit buses in North America (AG700) in 1989.

Washington, D.C.'s Circulator uses the A330 buses. These 29 buses were purchased from AC Transit in 2005. In addition to the A330 models, the Circulator now uses the new A300K buses, which first went into service in April 2009. The Circulator recently took delivery of fourteen A300K, 31-foot (9.4 m) buses to build out its route structure. The A300K was chosen because of its ability to do the work of 40-foot (12.2 m) buses for nearly all operations with the smaller body and engine of a midi bus.

FirstTransit took delivery of twelve A300Ls and four AG300s in early 2009, for use on the University of Minnesota Campus Connector.

Baltimore, Maryland's Charm City Circulator have recently ordered and since put five A300Ls into service early 2011. The A300L was a supplement order to their already existing, but rehabilitating Designline buses.

==== TX- American Version highway Coach ====
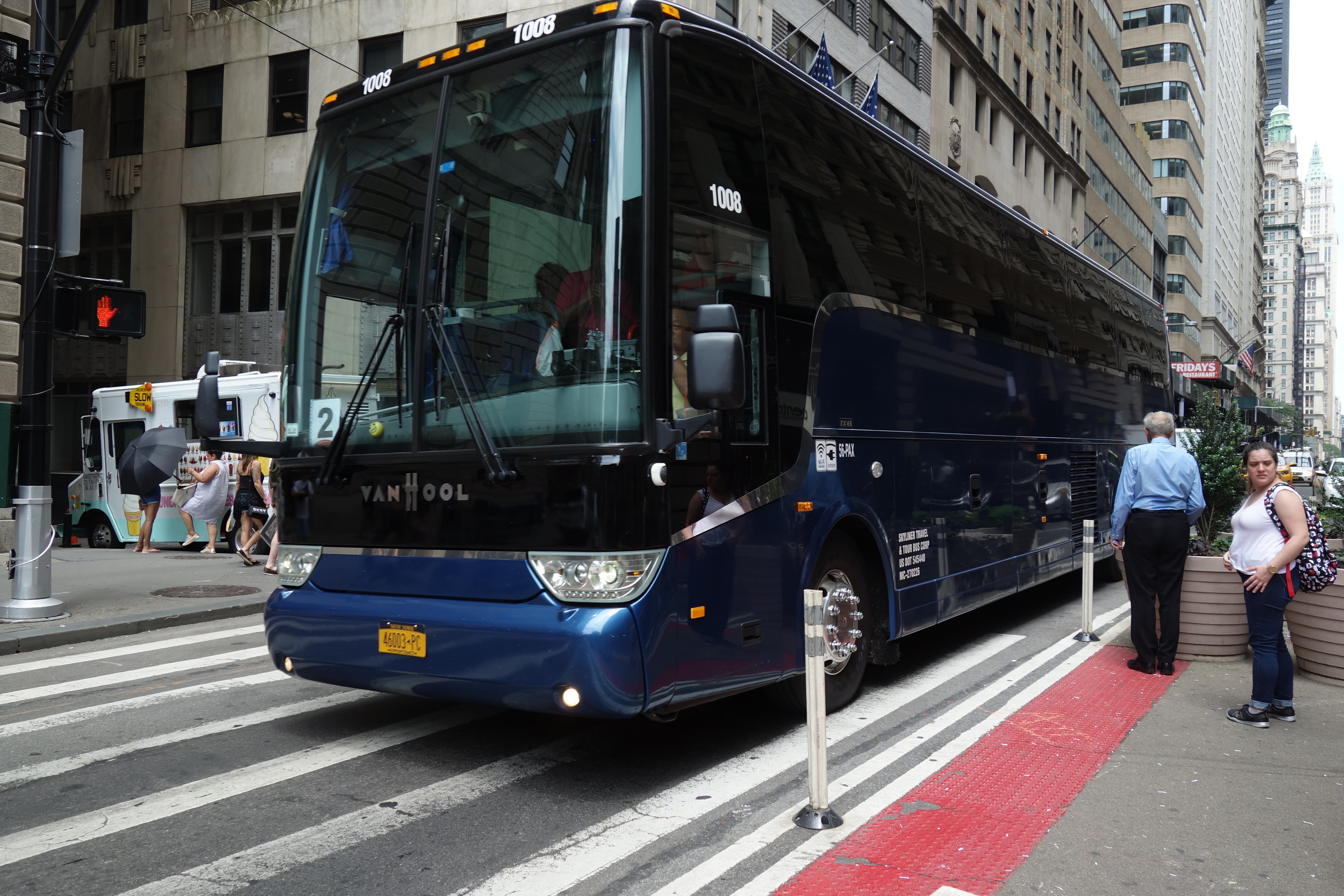
Van Hool TX45 going through Downtown NYC

In 2015, Van Hool started production of the TX40 and TX45 highway coach in the US. In 2018, production of the TX series stopped in the US.

=== Current products ===
==== T21 series luxury touring coach ====
Introduced in 1995 and based on the European T9 platform, the T21 series features an updated design and more engine choices. Whereas the T8 and T9 series are almost exclusively powered by Cummins diesel engines, the T21 series is available with Cummins M11 plus, Detroit Diesel Series 60, or Caterpillar C13 ACERT engines. Later models of the T21 simplified the windshield into two panes only, replaced headlight assemblies with individual projector lamps, and consolidated the driver console. It is available as 40-foot (12.2 m) T2140 or extended 45-foot (13.7 m) T2145 versions.

==== C2000 series touring coach ====
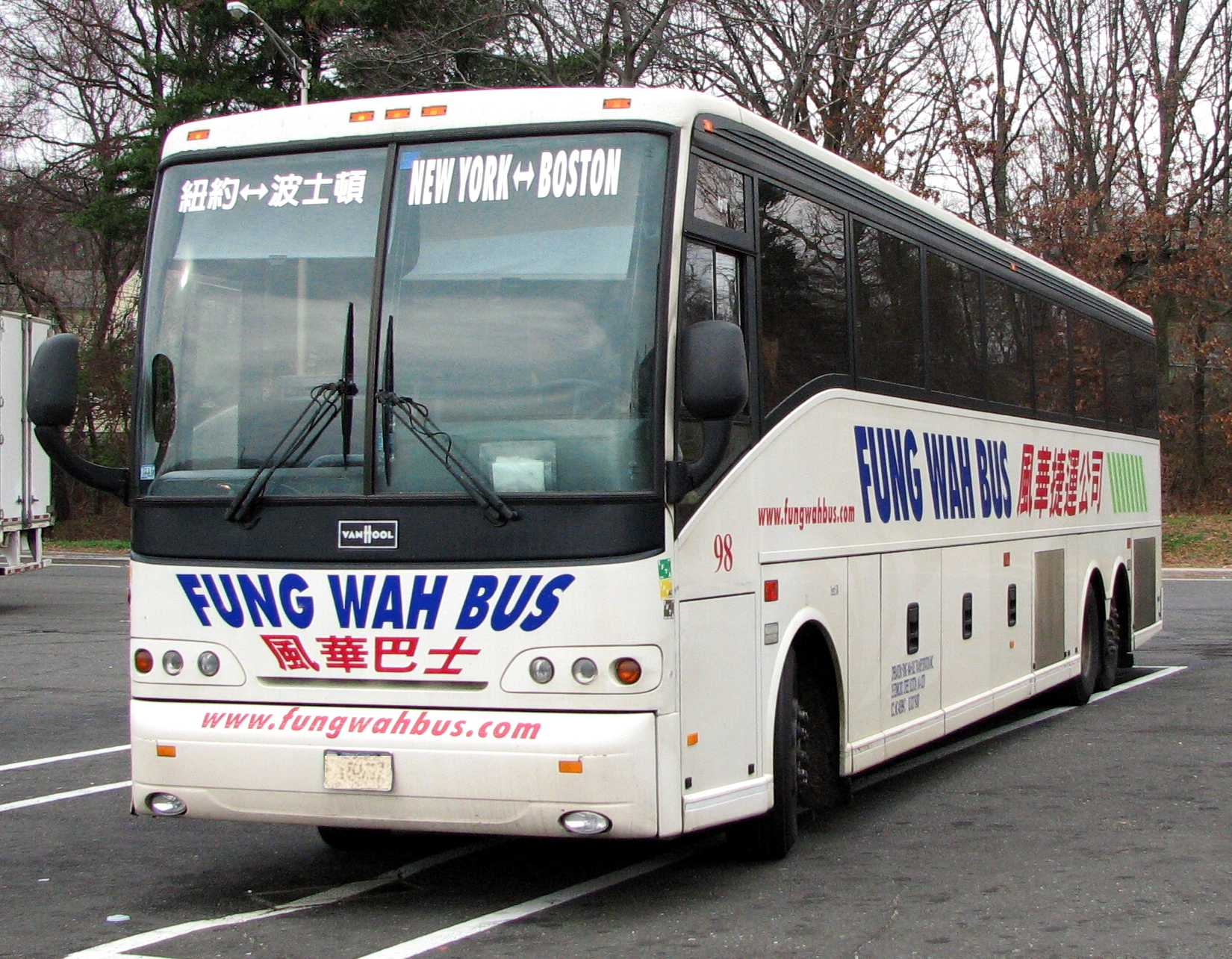
A Fung Wah Bus Van Hool C2045 in eastern Connecticut

Introduced as a lower-cost coach for long-distance routes, the C20 series, styled similarly to the T21 series, was introduced in 2000 to the United States market. C20 is available with Cummins ISX12 or Detroit Diesel DD13 engines. Previous generations could also be equipped with Cummins M11 plus, Cummins ISM, Detroit Diesel series 60 and Caterpillar C13 engines. Both Allison B500 automatic and ZF AS Tronic automated gearboxes are available. Greyhound operates a fleet of C2045s along with its MCI buses in Michigan.

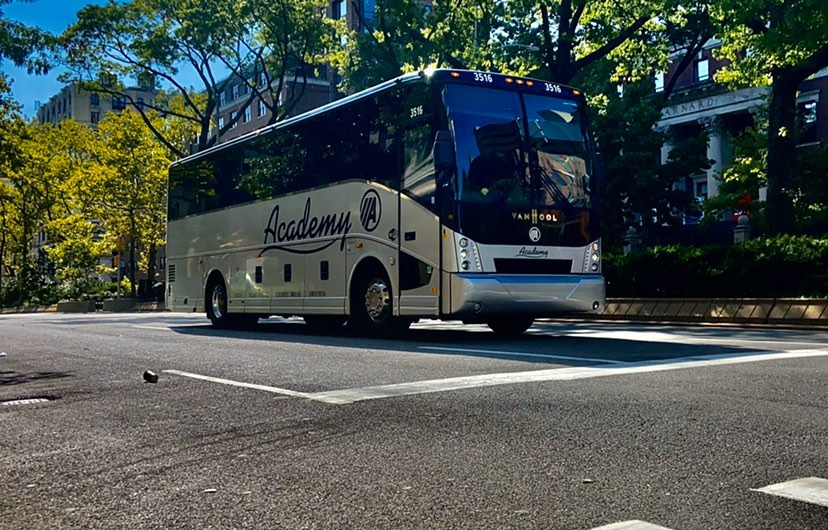
An Academy Bus Lines CX35 in New York City

==== CX series touring coach ====
Introduced in 2013 for the 2014 model year, the CX45 is a redesigned C2045 with a redesigned front end, new rear cap, and new interior features. It was offered with the Cummins ISX12 until 2019, before switching to the Cummins X12. The Detroit Diesel DD13 is also offered.

In 2015, Van Hool introduced a 35-foot coach to the North American market to compete with the MCI J3500. This coach is called the CX35 and is offered with a Cummins L9 (ISL9 before 2017) engine.

Introduced in 2019, the CX45E is an all-electric version of the CX45, with Proterra batteries. A CX35E is in the works, but has not been released as of yet.

==== TD925 Astromega double-deck touring motorcoach ====
The TD925 Astromega is a closed-top double-decker motor coach meeting United States specifications. It is a variant of the TD925 Astromega coach available in Europe.

== Products ==
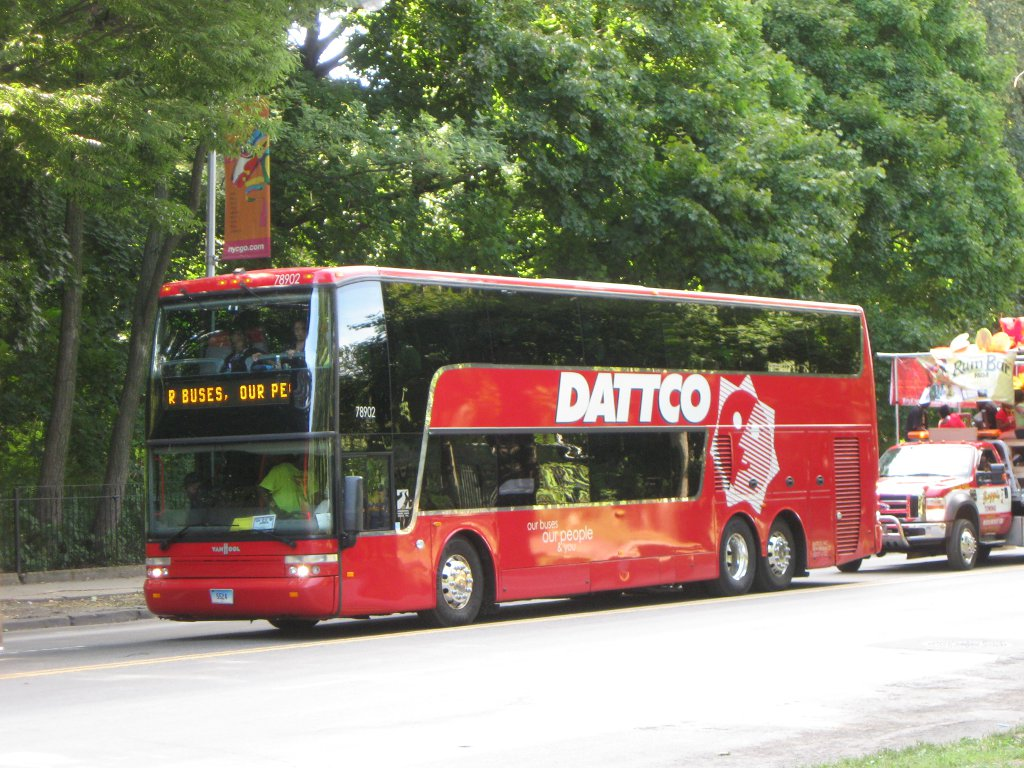
A Van Hool TD925 bus in New York City

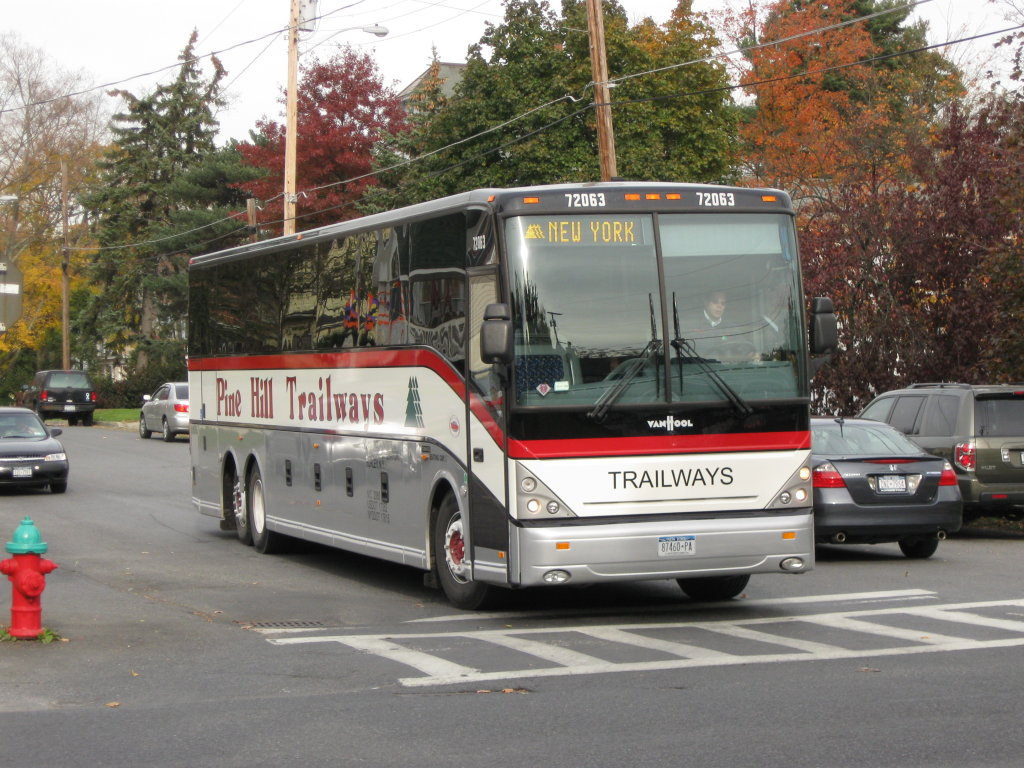
A Van Hool C2045-L in New York City

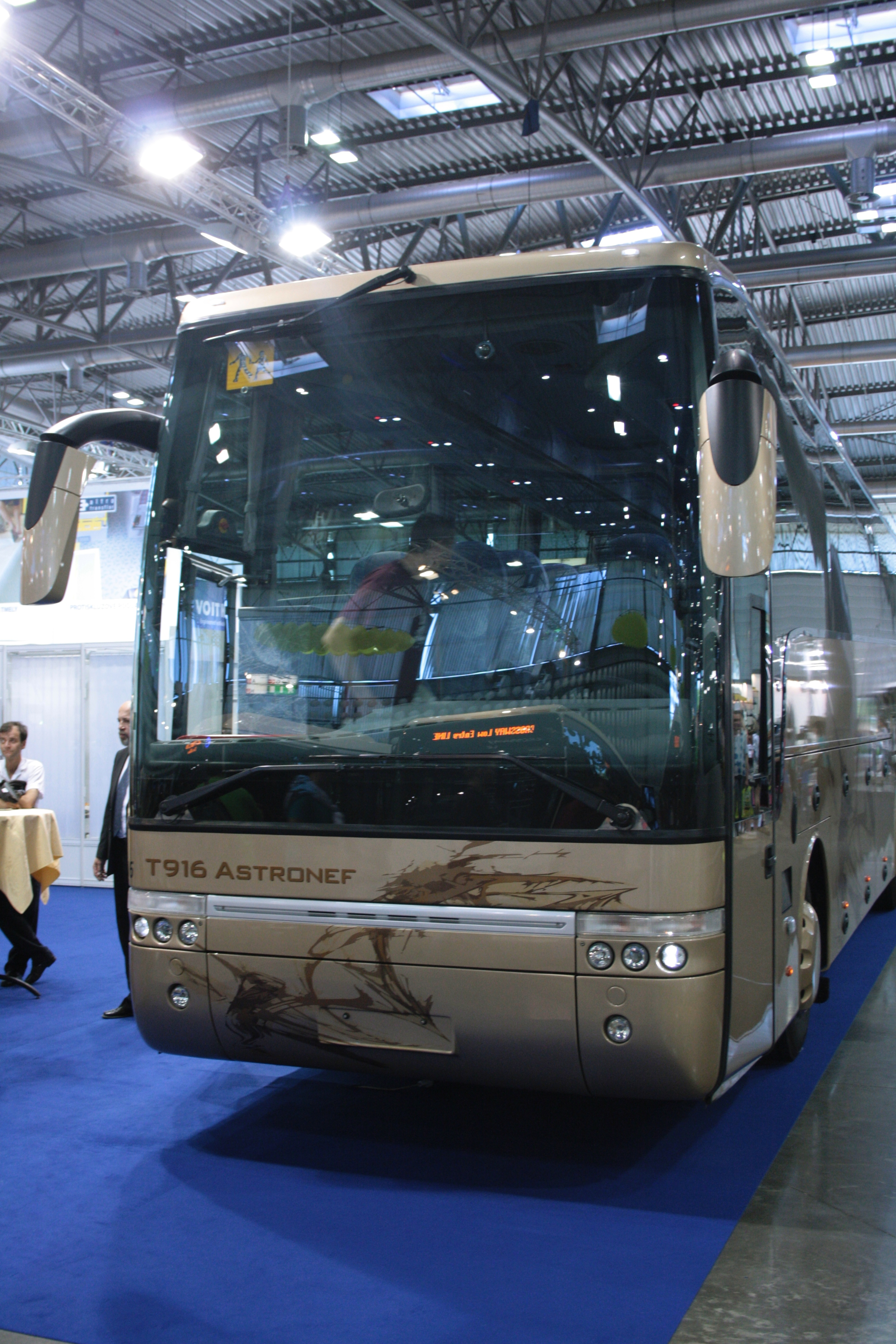
Van Hool T916 Astronef

=== Transit buses ===
==== Europe ====
- A308 midibus, full low floor, with side-mounted engine. Also available as diesel-electric hybrid.
- A309 midibus, low entry (low floor up to the second door). Also available as diesel-electric hybrid.
- A320 standard bus (out of production)
- A300 standard bus, full low floor, with side-mounted engine. Also available as diesel-electric hybrid.
- A300 CNG standard bus
- A360 standard bus, low entry. Also available as diesel-electric hybrid.
- A330 standard bus, full low floor, engine placed horizontally in the back. Also available as diesel-electric hybrid.
- A330 CNG standard bus
- AG300 articulated bus. Also available as diesel-electric hybrid.
- AGG300 bi-articulated bus
- A330T trolleybus
- AG300T articulated trolleybus
- AG300 CNG articulated bus
- ExquiCity 18 articulated BRT bus (diesel electric hybrid, trolley, fuel cell or electric)
- ExquiCity 24 bi-articulated BRT bus (diesel electric hybrid, trolley, fuel cell or electric
- A308E electric bus
- newA300K 30-foot (9.1 m) bus, shortened A300L
- newA300L 40-foot (12.2 m) full low floor bus, side-mounted midship engine
- newA330 40-foot (12.2 m) full low floor bus, side-mounted rear engine
- newAG300 60-foot (18.3 m) articulated full low floor bus, side-mounted midship engine

=== Touring coaches ===
==== Europe ====
- T915 Atlon
- T916 Atlon
- TX11 Alicron
- TX15 Alicron
- TX16 Alicron
- TX15 Acron
- TX16 Acron
- TX17 Acron
- TX18 Acron
- TX16 Astron
- TX17 Astron
- TX15 Astronef
- TX16 Astronef
- TX17 Astronef
- TX17 Altano
- TX18 Altano
- TX19 Altano

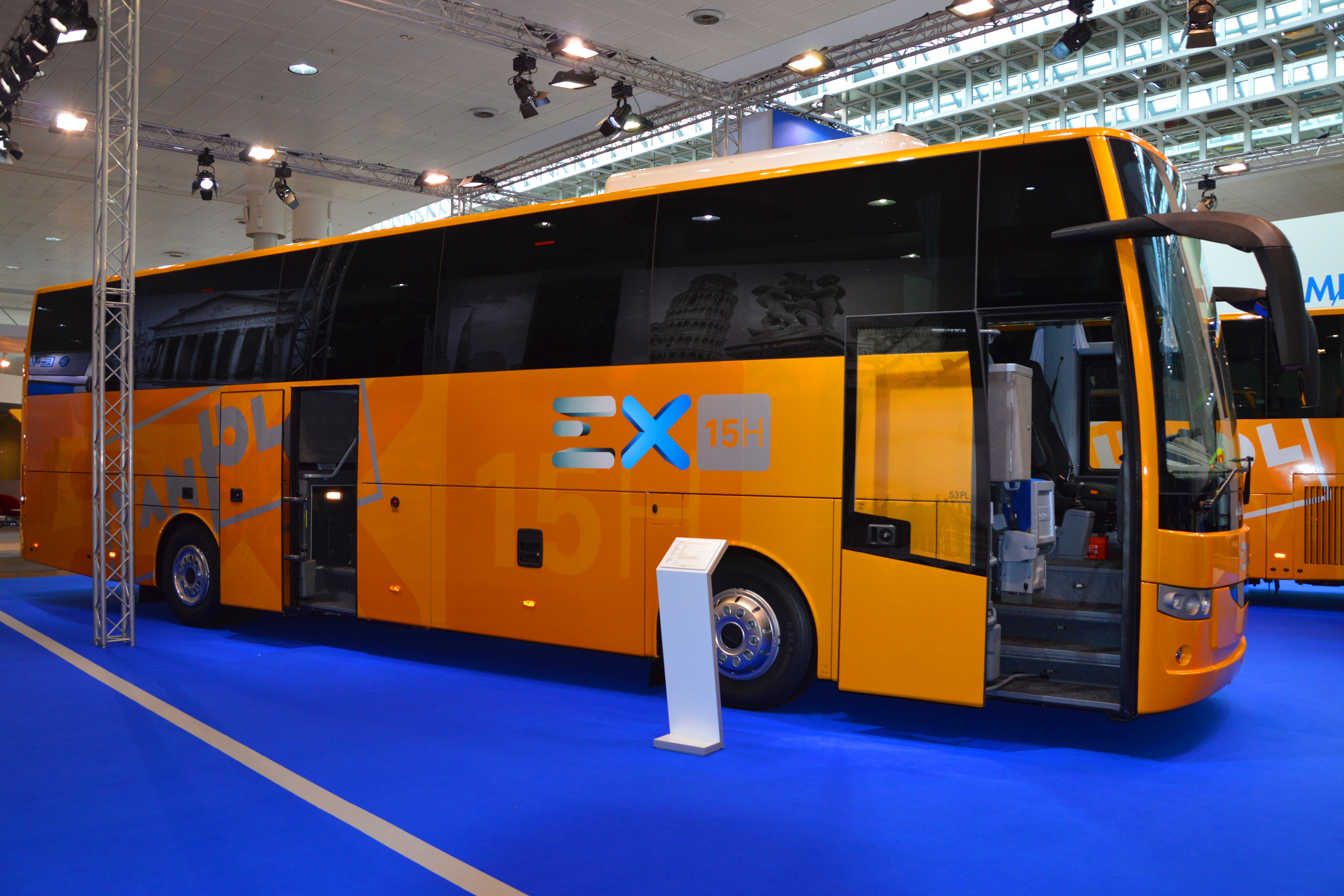
A Van Hool EX15H available 2015

- TDX20 Altano
- TDX21 Altano
- TDX25 Astromega
- TDX27 Astromega
- TD925 Astromega
- EX15H
- EX16M
- EX17H

==== North America ====
- TX40(Discontinued)
- TX45(Discontinued)
- CX35
- CX45
- TD925 Astromega USA

==== Japan ====
- TDX24 Astromega（Model for intercity buses is called “J-InterCity DD”.）

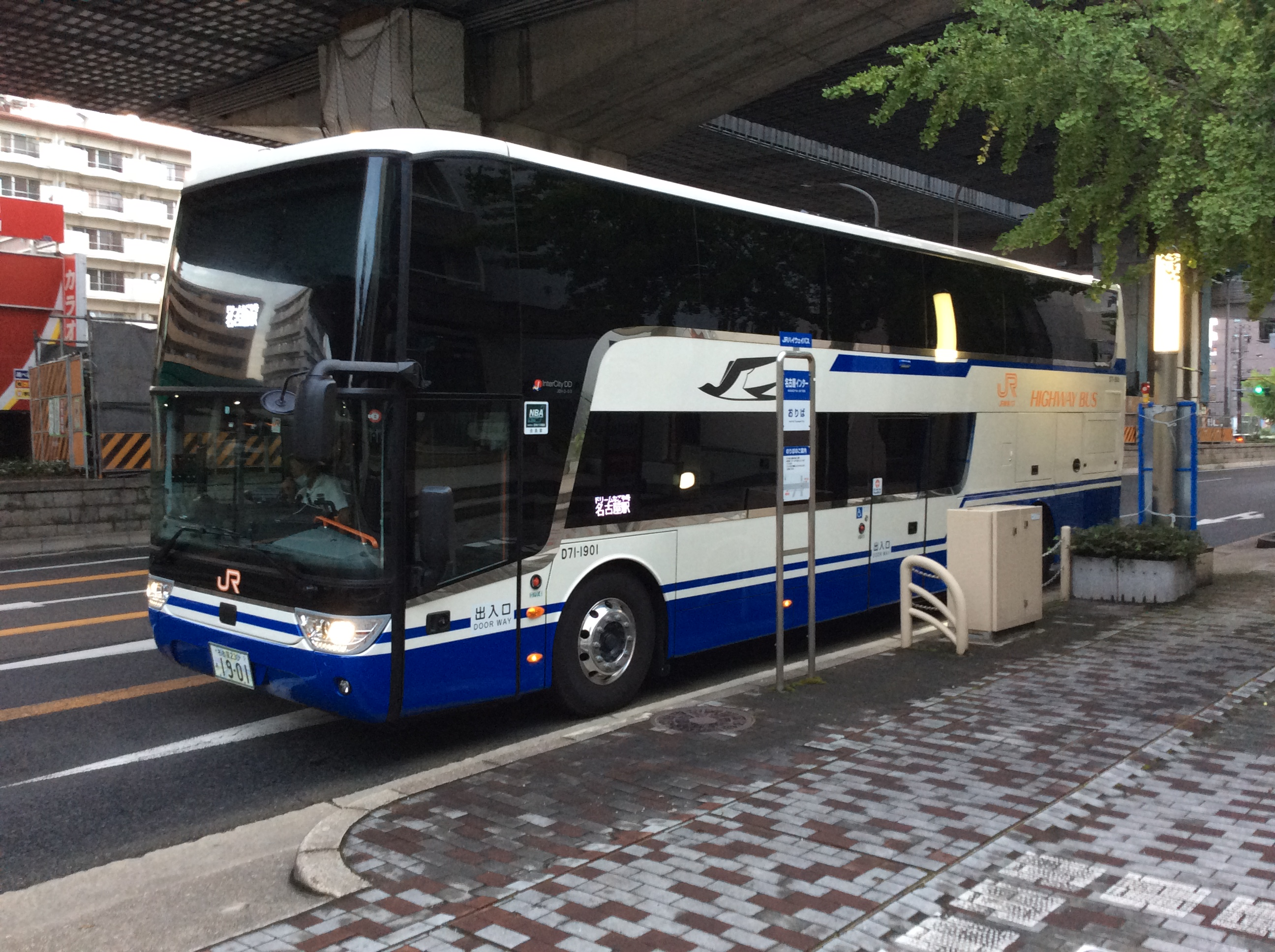
TDX24 Astromega in Meitō-ku, Nagoya (JR Tokai bus)

=== Trolleybuses ===
- Van Hool A300T
- ExquiCity Trolleybus
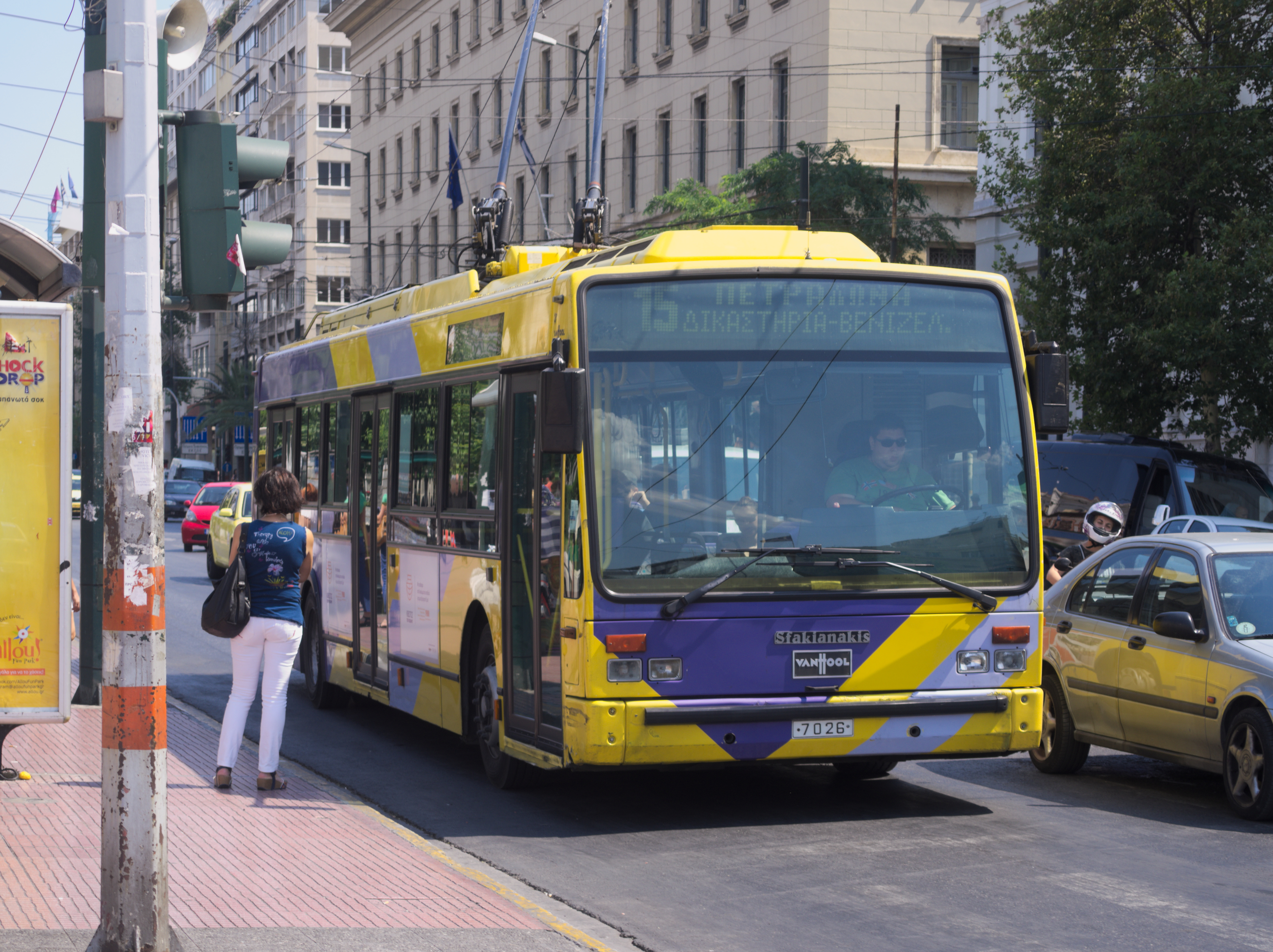
VanHool A300T in Greece

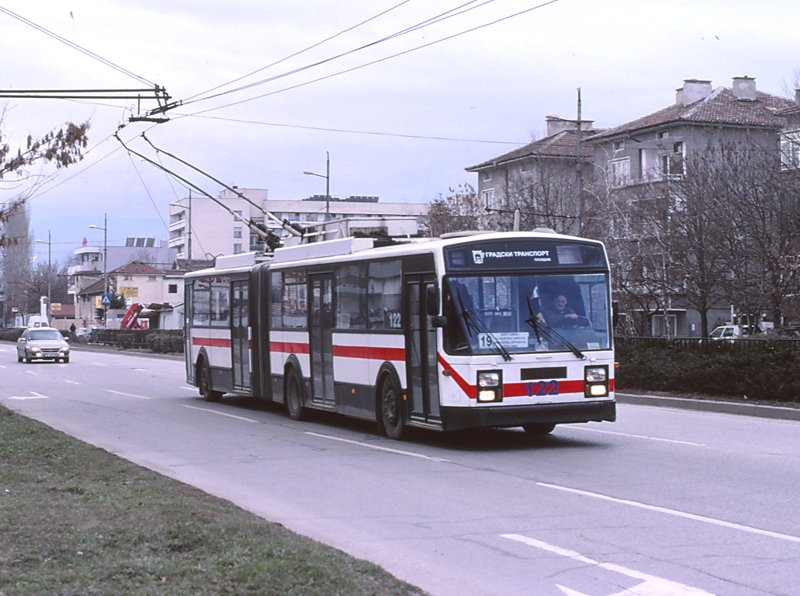
Van Hool AG280T in Bulgaria

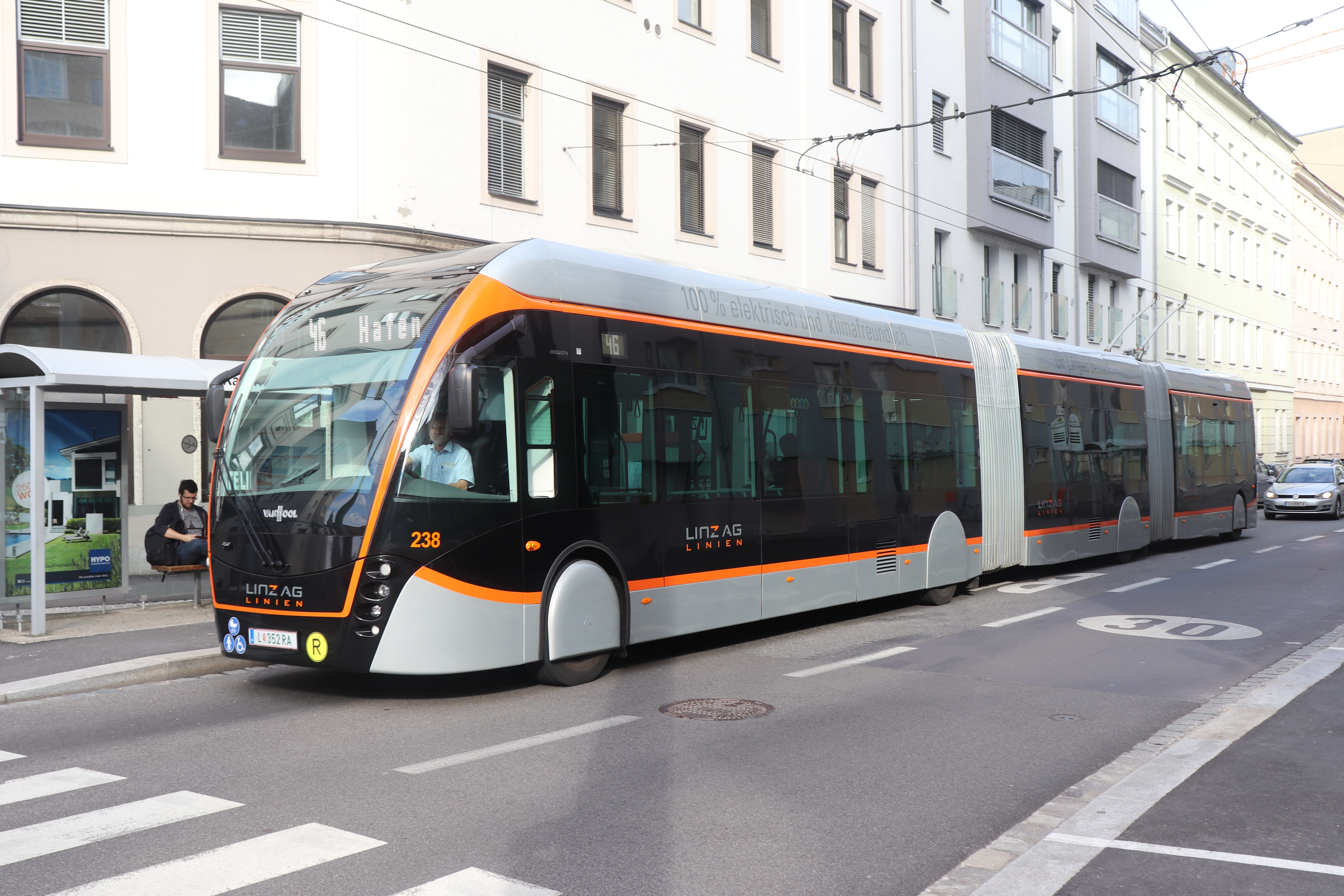
Van Hool ExquiCity in Austria

=== Airside transfer buses ===
- Van Hool AP1130
- Van Hool AP1137
- Van Hool AP1237
- Van Hool AP1325
- Van Hool AP2375
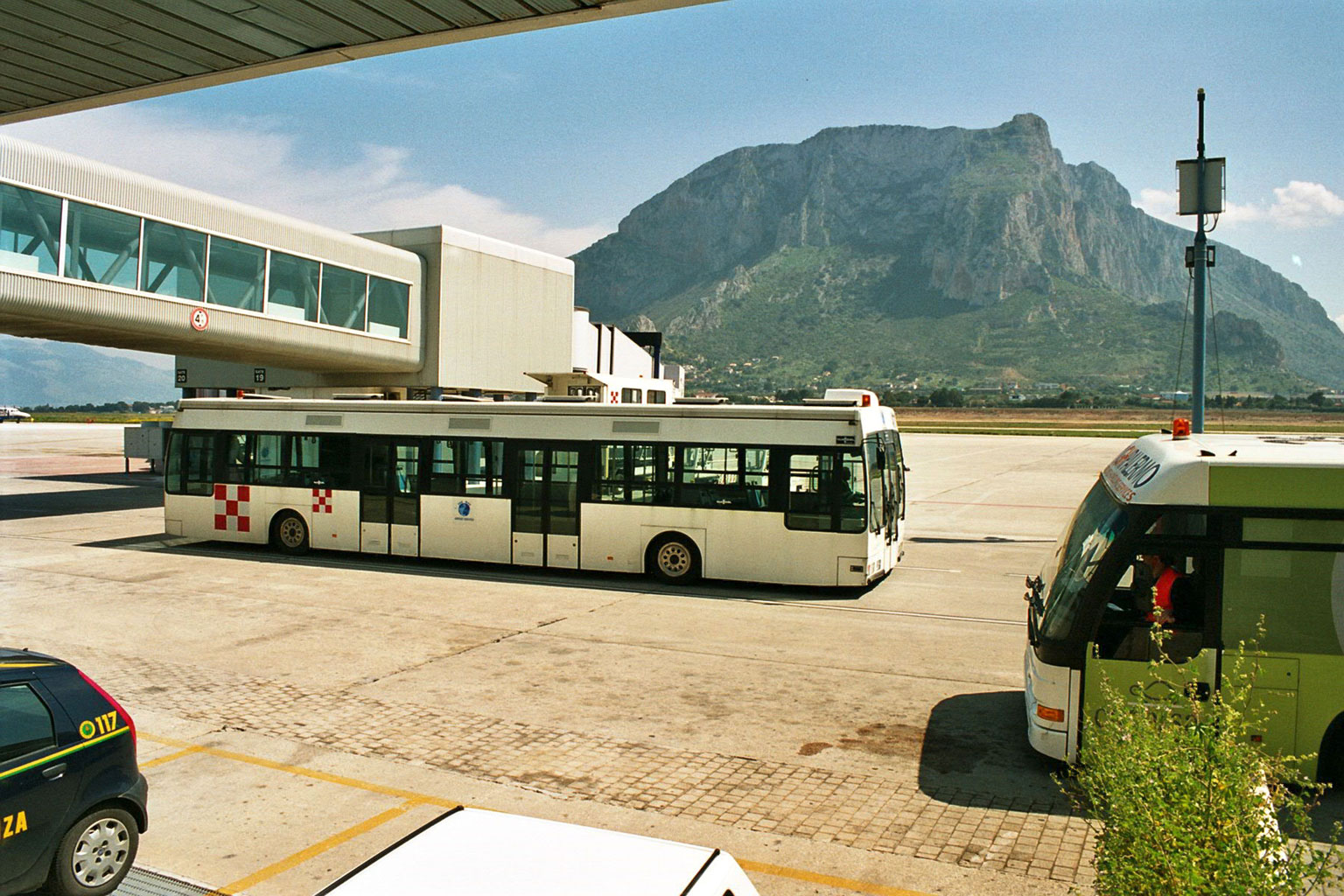
Van Hool AP-series bus at Palermo Airport, Italy

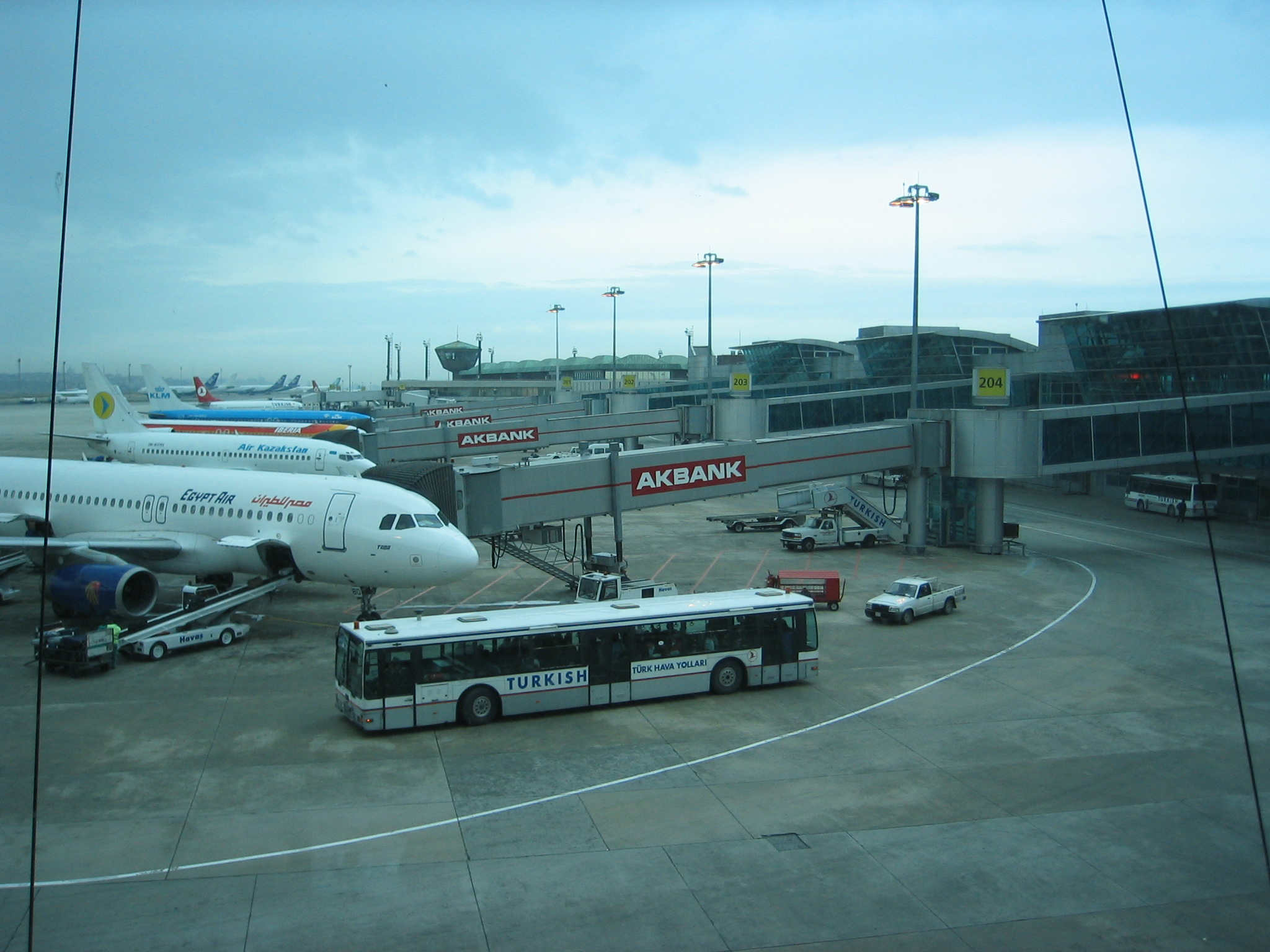
Van Hool AP1137 in Turkey

== In motorsport ==
Van Hool owned Team Astromega, which competed in International Formula 3000 and A1 Grand Prix with drivers including family member Mikke Van Hool.
