= LAG Motorcoach =

LAG Bus
- Company type: Private
- Industry: Coach builder
- Predecessor: Lambert et Arnold Geusens
- Founded: Bree, Belgium (1947)
- Founder: Lambert Geusens & Arnold Geusens
- Defunct: 1990
- Fate: Spin-off
- Successor: EOS Coach Manufacturing Company
- Area served: Europe, North America
- Products: Galaxy 300T, Panoramic 350T, EOS
- Subsidiaries: LAG Motorcoach (Bel Air, MD, U.S.A.)

LAG Motorcoach was the North American subsidiary of LAG Manufacturing Company, of Bree, Belgium.

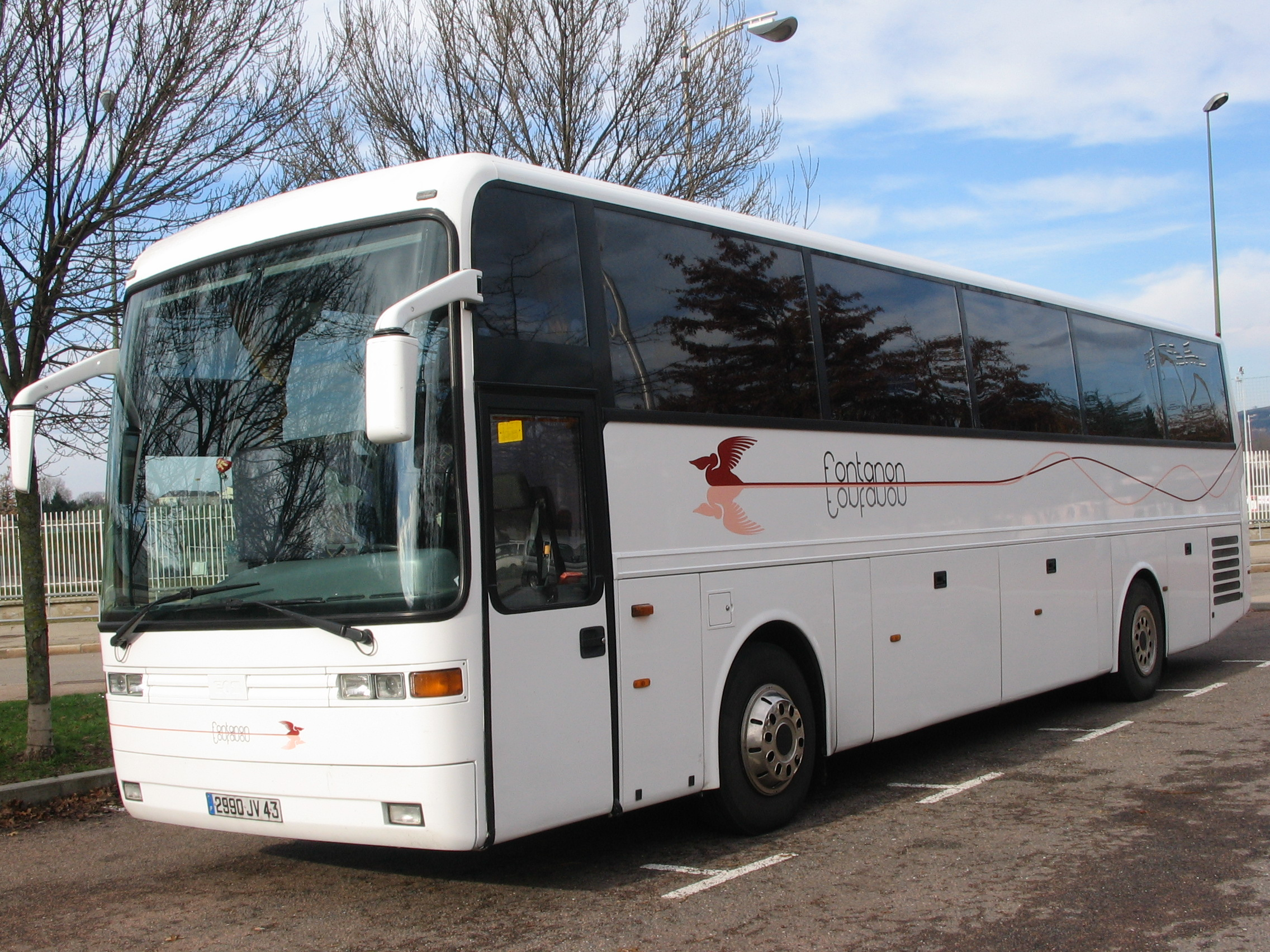
An EOS 90 in the Stade Geoffroy-Guichard parking lot in Saint-Étienne, France in November 2008

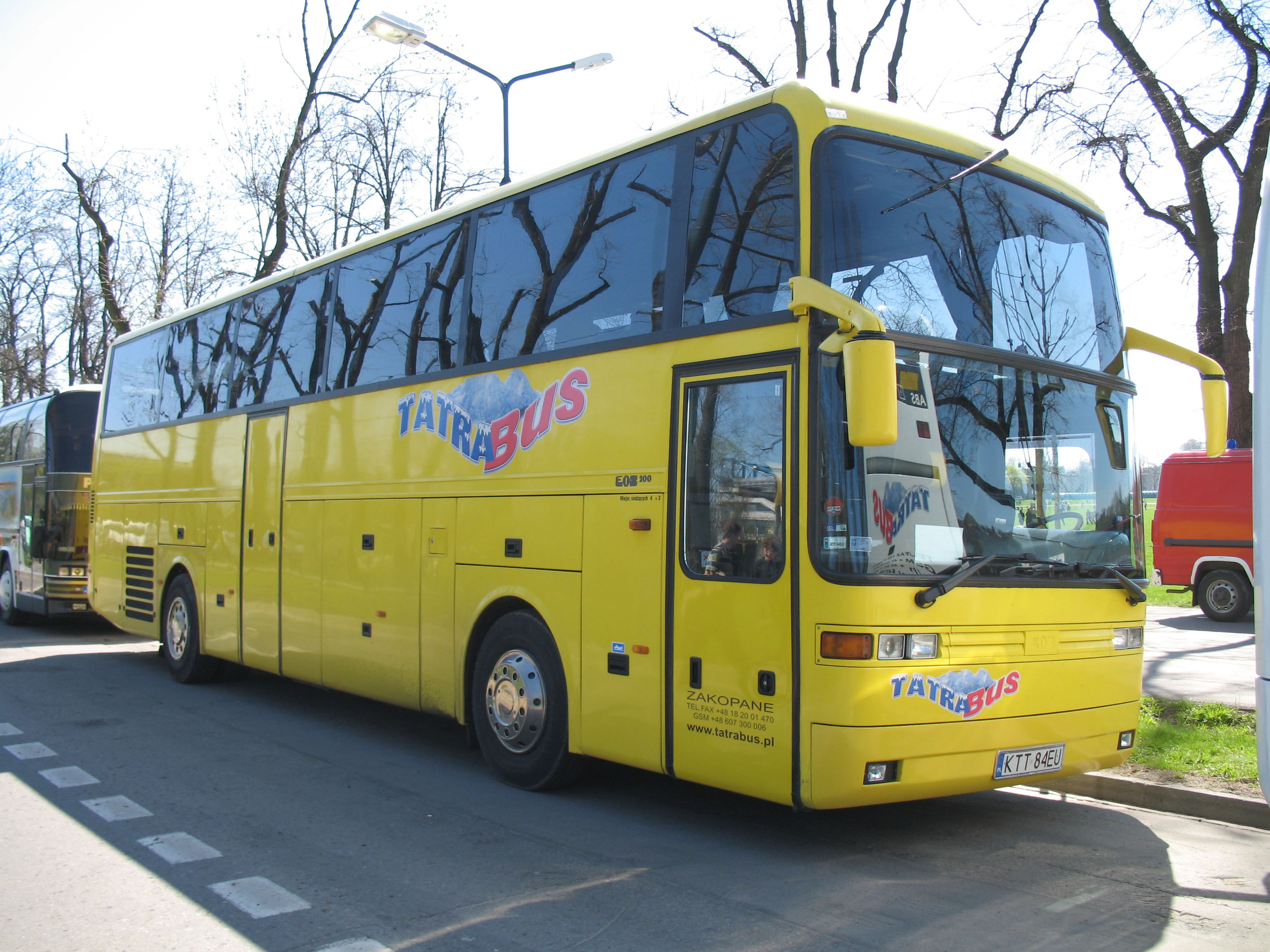
A 1998 Tatra Bus Zakopane EOS 200 coach in Kraków, Poland

== History ==
LAG is a Belgian company founded in 1947 by two brothers, Lambert and Arnold Geusens, hence the name. The two started by manufacturing construction machinery, but soon moved into semi-trailers, especially dump and stainless steel and aluminum tankers. In 1974, a neighbouring firm convinced LAG to diversify into products for passenger transport. After some initial hesitation, LAG introduced a small series of school- and mixed-use buses. By the end of the decade, a dedicated LAG Bus division was created.

The Galaxy 300T was introduced in 1979. It was built on a Renault or Volvo chassis, with a DAF or MAN engine. It was also offered later on DAF or Scania chassis. An integral version was available from 1982. In 1984 the Panoramic 350T was introduced, also as a unibody coach or on others' chassis. It achieved modest success as an export model luxury touring coach, primarily in the United States because of its relatively low price. The main difference between European and North American LAG coaches was the third (tag) axle on the latter. The lavatory's position was also optional in America, as it could be located mid-ship on the lower level, or at the rear of the passenger area. In either instance it reduced passenger capacity by four, rather than the more common two seats. In 1989 the 3-series was replaced by the EOS 100.

In the summer of 1990 LAG spun off its coachbuilding operation as the EOS Coach Manufacturing Co. and sold it to nearby manufacturer Van Hool, which also produced both buses and tank trailers. Under Van Hool management, the product line was expanded:

| Model | Type | Discontinued |
|---|---|---|
| EOS 80 | short low-height body | late 2000 |
| EOS 90 | short version | early 2001 |
| EOS 90L | 12.8 metres (42 ft) lengthened version | mid-2001 |
| EOS 100 | | 1994 |
| EOS 200 | restyled EOS 100 | early 2003 |
| EOS 200L | restyled EOS 100 12.8 metres (42 ft) lengthened version | mid-2002 |
| EOS 230 | 3-axle 12 metres (39 ft) mainly for the UK | unknown |
| EOS 233 | 3-axle 13.6 metres (45 ft) long version | mid-2002 |

The EOS line was phased out in 2001–2002, when Van Hool transferred production of its own T9-series coach into the Bree plant.

=== LAG today ===
In 1996, the Dutch company Burg Industries BV purchased LAG Trailers NV. In 2010 the Flemish company employed approximately 500 employees, and had an annual production of over 2,000 vehicles of all types.

== See also ==
- Van Hool
