= Hato Bus =

Japanese sightseeing bus operator

Hato Bus Co., Ltd

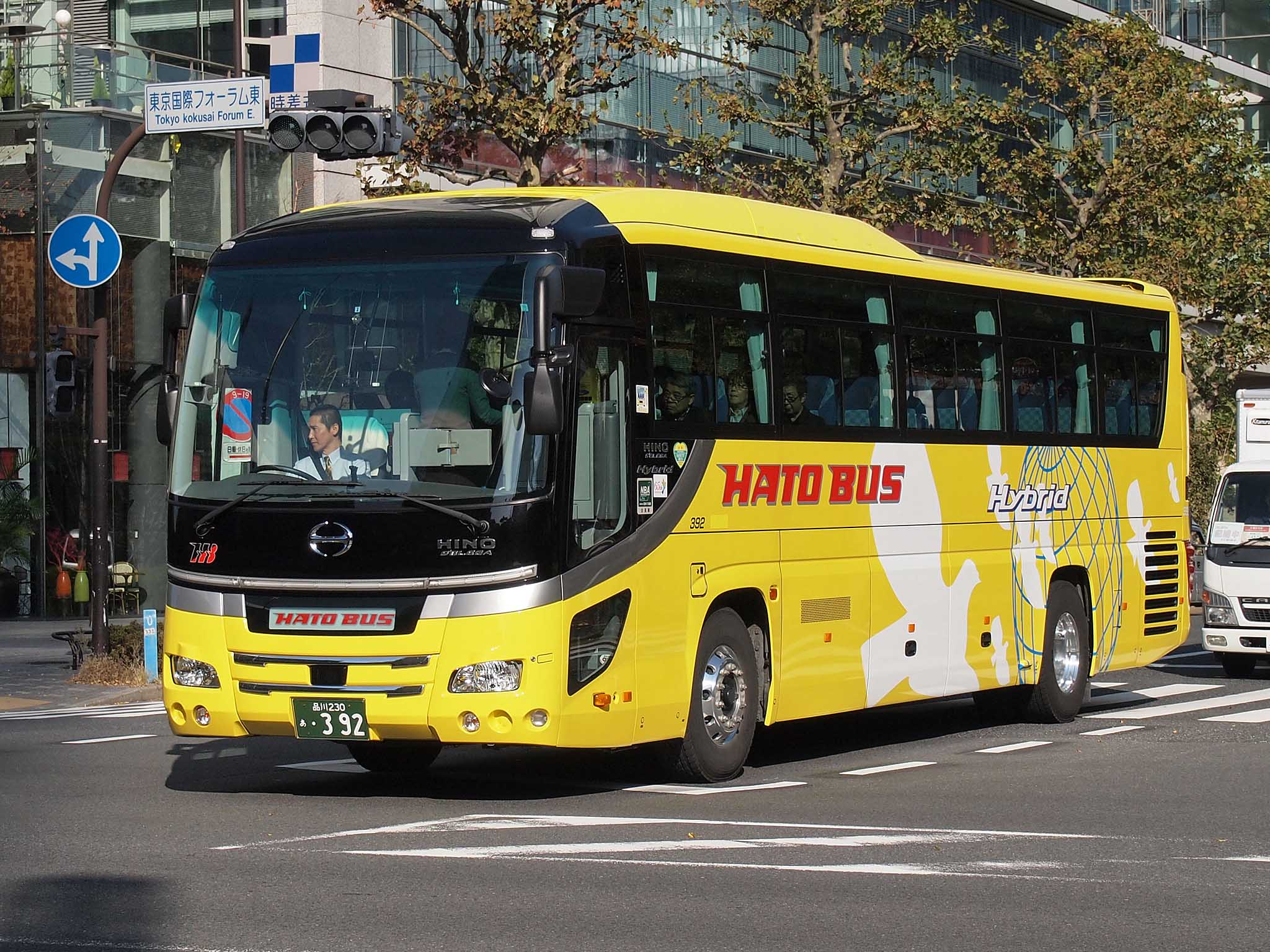
- Parent: Tokyo Metropolitan Government (37.93%); JTB Corporation (27.57%)
- Founded: August 14, 1948
- Locale: Metropolitan Tokyo region and Kanagawa Prefecture
- Service area: Tokyo, Kanagawa, Japan
- Service type: Sightseeing Bus
- Routes: Around 100 routes
- Fleet: 136 buses
- Chief executive: 中村 靖 (Nakamura Yasushi)
- Employees: 1,064

Hato Bus Co., Ltd (はとバス株式会社) is a sightseeing bus company in Japan, based in Heiwajima, Ohta-ku, Tokyo. It mainly operates regular routes in Tokyo, Kanagawa Prefecture, and Chiba Prefecture, as well as regular sightseeing buses within the Kanto Region. The company also provides bus rental services.

Hato Bus is currently an unlisted public company with a registered capital of 450 million yen. Tokyo Metropolitan Government is the largest shareholder, which holds 37.9% of the shares in the company. Hato Bus has 1,064 employees, its net sales are 17.4 billion yen, and it owns 136 sightseeing buses as of 2019.

Hato Bus Company's main businesses are reserved sightseeing buses and planned bus tours. The Tokyo government established Hato Bus in 1948 to help Japanese tourists travel around Tokyo.

Hato Bus Company has branched into a number of different industries, including tourism, hospitality, car repair and real estate leasing. It now offers various bus tour offerings in other languages for foreign tourists.

== History ==
On August 14, 1948, New Japan Tourism Co., Ltd. was established with a capital of 20,000,000 yen, and it operated its first group chartered bus in January 1949. In March 1949, the sightseeing bus business was transferred to the Tokyo Metropolitan Government with an initial staff of five female guides. The company started regular Tokyo half-day sightseeing bus services. In April 1951, the company launched regular night time sightseeing services. In September 1951, it began full-day courses in Tokyo, and in June 1953 English-language tour serves for non-Japanese visitors.

In September 1963, the company changed to its current name Hato Bus Co., Ltd. From 1964 with the arrival of the Tokyo Summer Olympics the company further expanded services and offerings to meet visitor demand. Over the next 50 years it continued to substantially improve upon its services, destination offerings, and language services.

The company has used several models in its promotional campaigns, including Miya Kitani in 2006, Hisako Murakami in 2009, Natsumi Hirata in 2011, Momota Takada in 2013, Reina Hoshino in 2016, Airi Asako in 2017, and Chiharu Inaba in 2018.

== Bus tour courses and main bus stop ==
Hato Bus offers both middle and long distance sightseeing buses across the Kanto region, covering about 100 courses each day and night.

Hato Bus offers some tour itineraries in Chinese and English for foreign travelers.

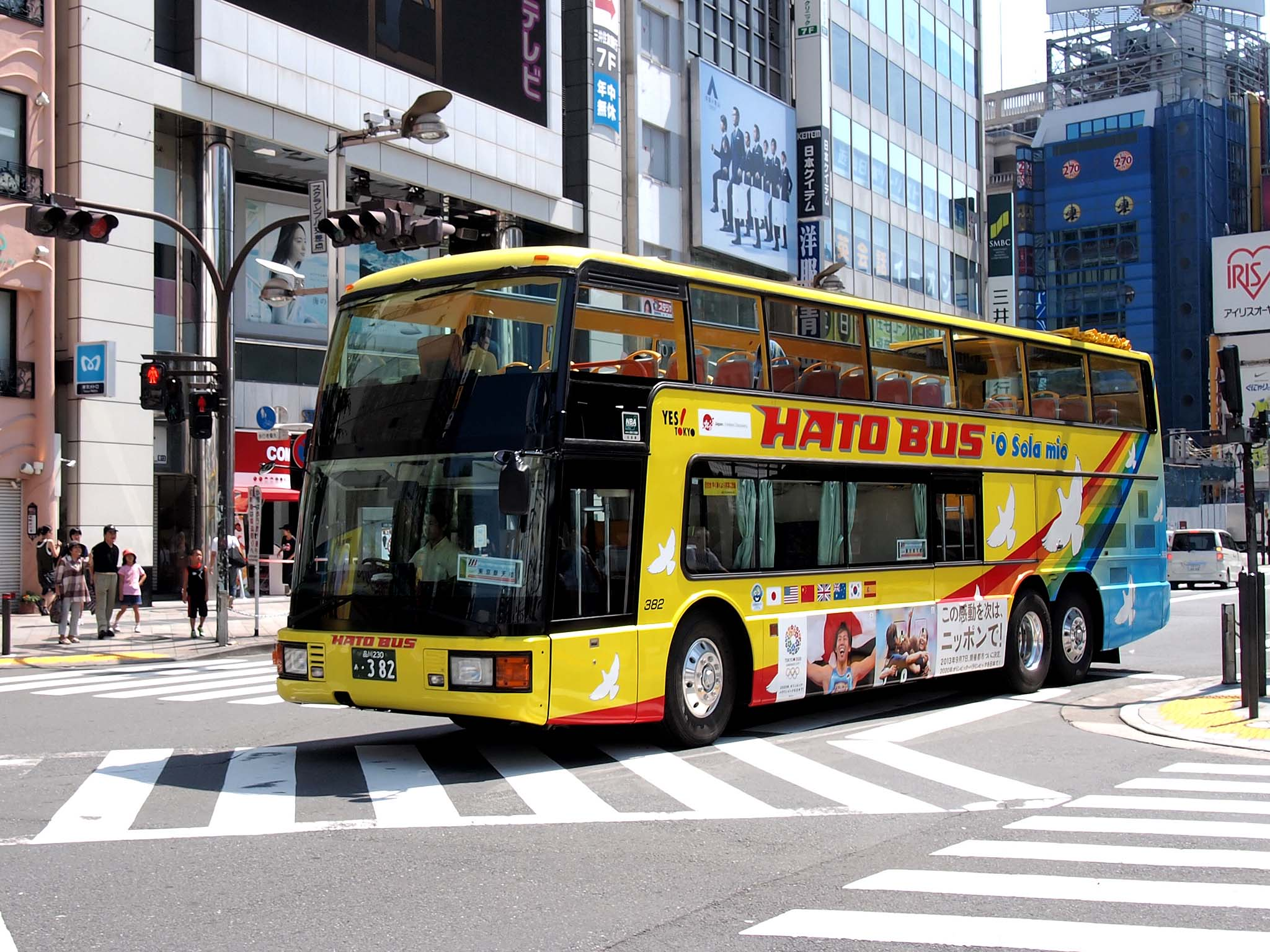

Specialized tours include haunted places in Tokyo with a professional ghost story guide.

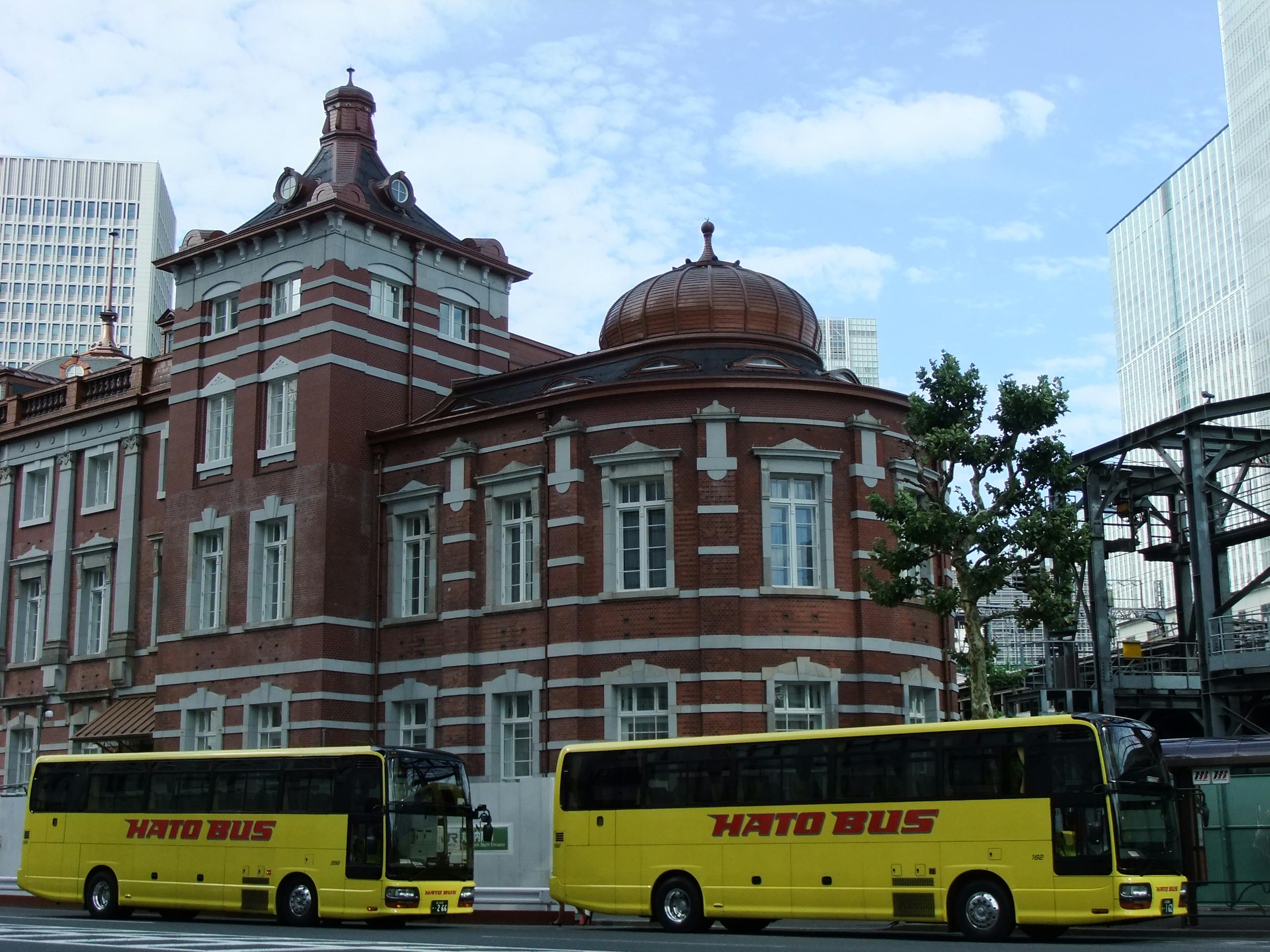

Tourists can also choose overnight bus tours with accommodations for 2 night/3 day itineraries.

The Hato Bus Company has 4 main bus stops in Tokyo and Yokohama in Hamamatsucho Station west exit, Tokyo Station south exit, Shinjuku Station west exit, and Yokohama Station east exit.

== Guides and services ==
Hato Bus Company currently has 153 bus guides: 151 females and 2 males. All guides are professionally trained by the company.

Sweets and beverages are included onboard the bus on longer-distance tours.

== Metropolitan bus service consignment ==
Hato Bus has been entrusted with route bus operations from the metropolitan bus, starting with Suginami in fiscal 2003 since Tokyo Metropolitan Government is the largest shareholder. As Hato Bus is already open as a regular sightseeing bus, there is no general route transferred from the metropolitan bus for consignment.

- Tokyo Metropolitan Bus Otakibashi bus office Suginami branch (小滝橋営業所杉並支所)
- Tokyo Metropolitan Bus Edogawa bus office Rinkai branch (江戸川営業所臨海支所)
- Tokyo Metropolitan Bus Minami-Senju bus office Aoto branch (南千住営業所青戸支所)
- Tokyo Metropolitan Bus Shinagawa bus office Konan branch (品川営業所港南支所)
- Tokyo Metropolitan Bus Shibuya bus office Shinjuku branch (渋谷営業所新宿支所)

== Related business ==
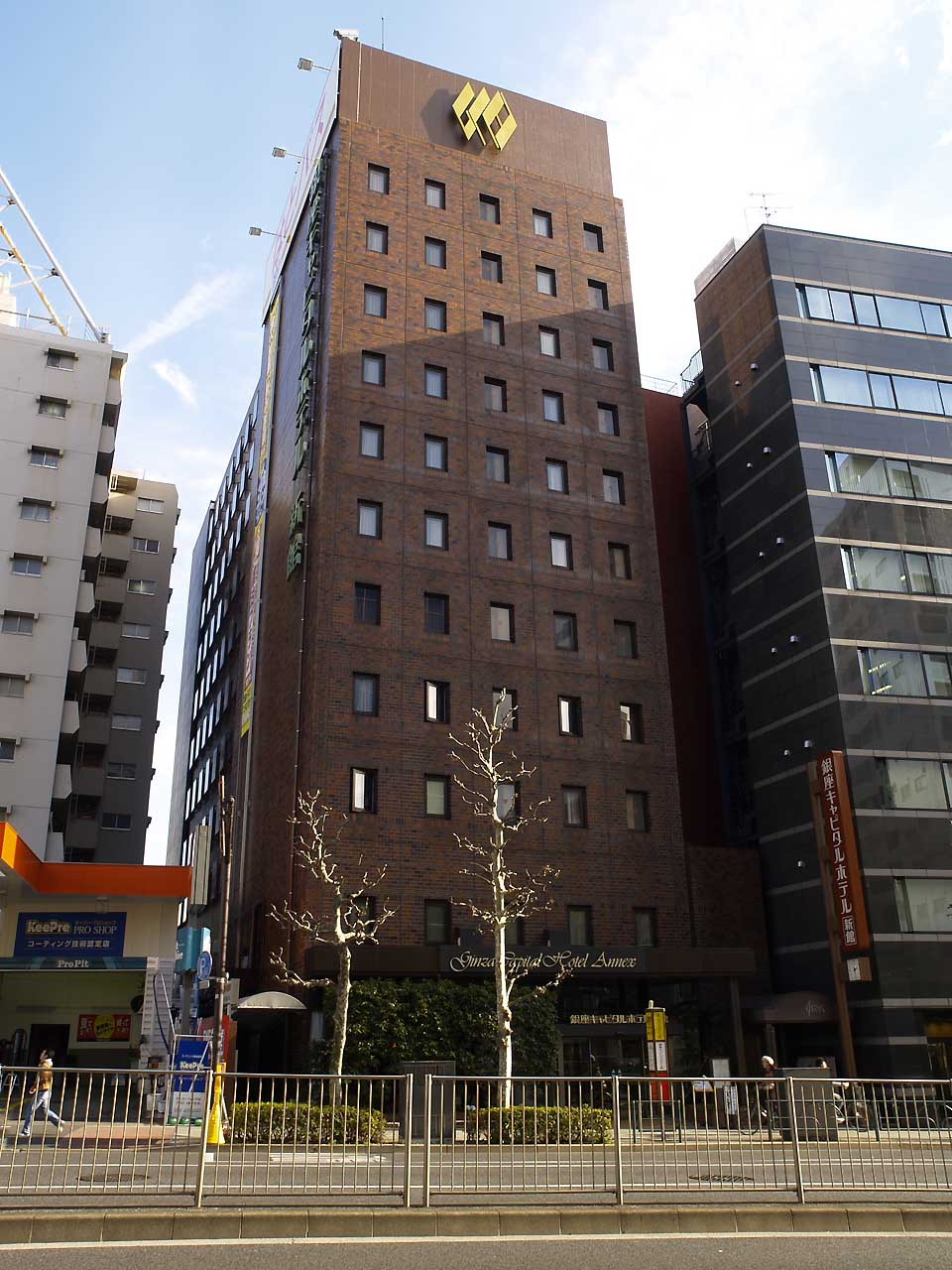
Ginza Capital Hotel annex

Hato Bus Company is the owner of the Ginza Capital Hotel in Tsukiji, Tokyo since July 1972. Transfers from the hotel to Tokyo Station Marunouchi South Entrance can be incorporated depending on the course of regular sightseeing.

The company operates a Japanese restaurant, 和膳 道灌かがり, in the Tamachi Kotsu Building. It also operates a restaurant-ship "Symphony" which is based at the Port of Tokyo, as well as night cruise tours from Koshakushi to Iku Yoru no Kaidan every year.
