= Airport Flyer =

Bus routes in Bristol, England

Airport Flyer is a brand of bus routes that serve Bristol Airport. The routes are operated by First West of England.

== History ==
In 2012, the route began operating 24 hours per day.

The A2 service was withdrawn in January 2018, after having its frequency halved from hourly to two-hourly in January.

In 2018, twelve double-decker Alexander Dennis Enviro400 MMC-bodied Scania N250UD buses were deployed on the route.

During the COVID-19 pandemic when passenger numbers to the airport had reduced, the A1 route was changed and the bus began serving local stops. This arrangement was discontinued in April 2022. From May 2022, Bristol Zone bus tickets were no longer accepted on the route.

From spring 2026, 21 new Yutong electric vehicles will be introduced to the services. 17 Yutong U11DDs will enter service on the A1 and 4 Yutong E12s on the A3. These will replace all diesel powered vehicles on the A1, but will be added to the current A3 fleet with the new A2 service.

Starting in April 2026, a new A2 service will operate between the airport and Portishead. The service will be operated by First West of England via Nailsea & Backwell Station, Nailsea, Tickenham, Clevedon, Walton in Gordano and Weston in Gordano. This will operate 24 hours and on an hourly service.

== Routes ==
=== A1 Bristol Bus Station to Bristol Airport ===
A1
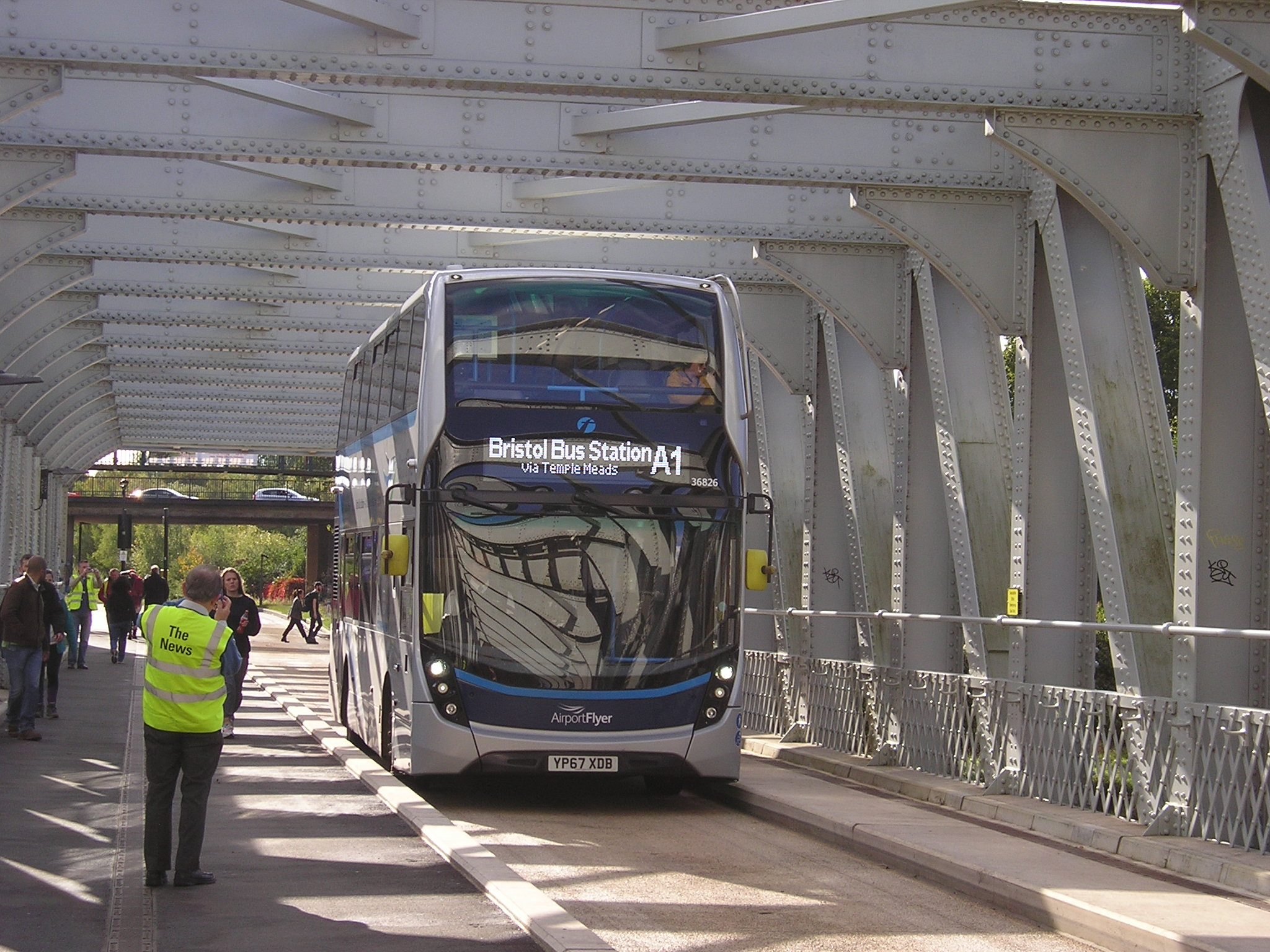

Overview
- Operator: First West of England
- Garage: Hengrove
- Vehicles: Yutong U11DD
- Peak vehicle requirement: 15

Route
- Start: Bristol Bus Station
- Via: Bristol City Centre; Bristol Temple Meads; Bedminster
- End: Bristol Airport

Service
- Level: 24 hours daily (No service Christmas Day)
- Frequency: up to every 8 minutes

The A1 operates a limited stop service via Bristol City centre, Temple Meads Station and Lime Kiln Roundabout before serving all stops along the A38 to the airport.

=== A2 Portishead Sainsburys to Bristol Airport ===
A2
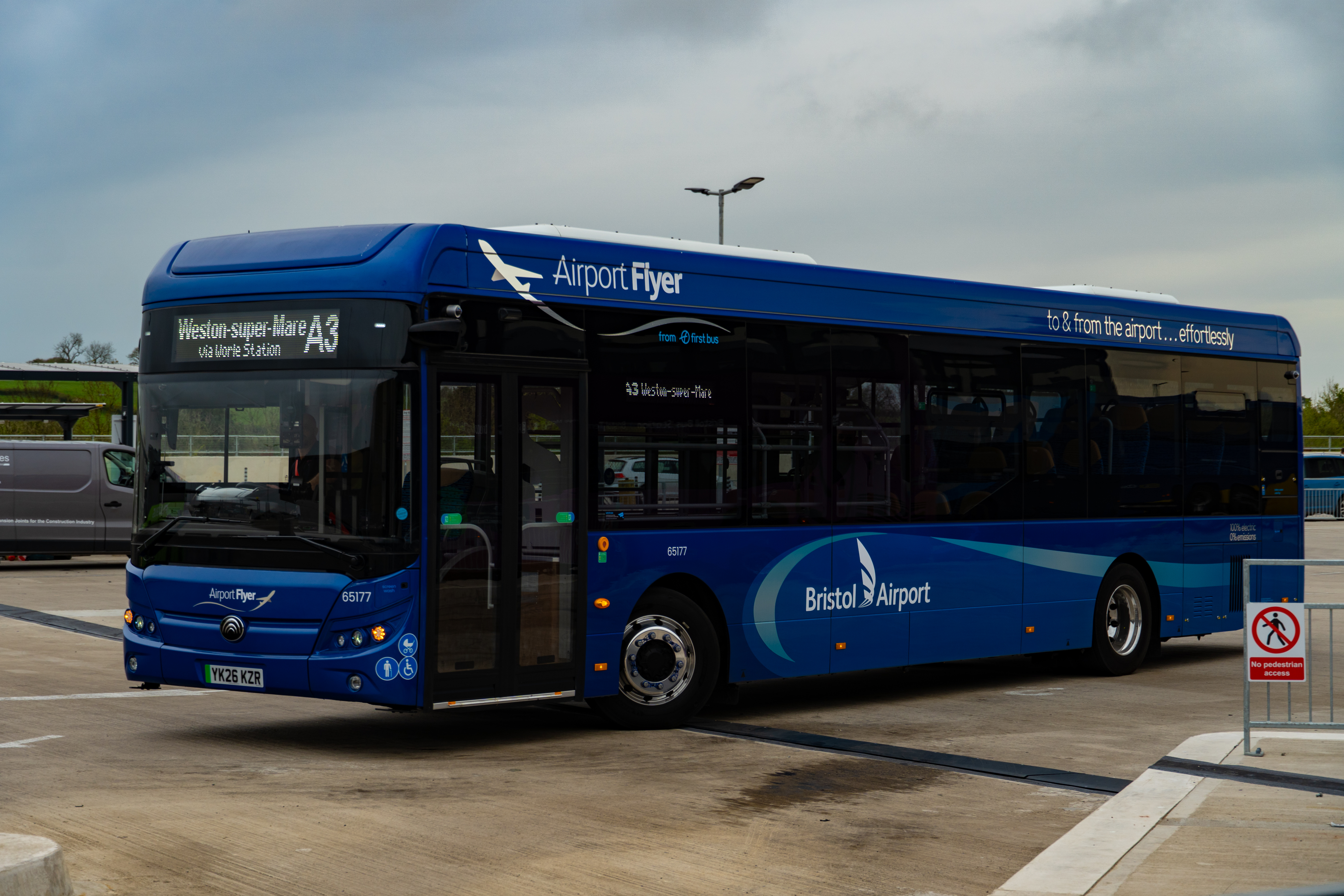

Overview
- Operator: First West of England
- Garage: Weston-super-Mare
- Vehicles: Yutong E12 and Alexander Dennis Enviro200 MMC
- Peak vehicle requirement: 2

Route
- Start: Portishead
- Via: Weston in Gordano Walton in Gordano; Clevedon; Tickenham; Nailsea; Backwell Downside
- End: Bristol Airport

Service
- Level: 24 hours daily (No service Christmas Day)
- Frequency: Every 60 minutes

The A2 operates via Downside, Backwell, Nailsea & Backwell Station, Nailsea, Tickenham, Clevedon, Walton in Gordano and Weston in Gordano.

=== A3 Weston-super-Mare Station to Bristol Airport ===
A3
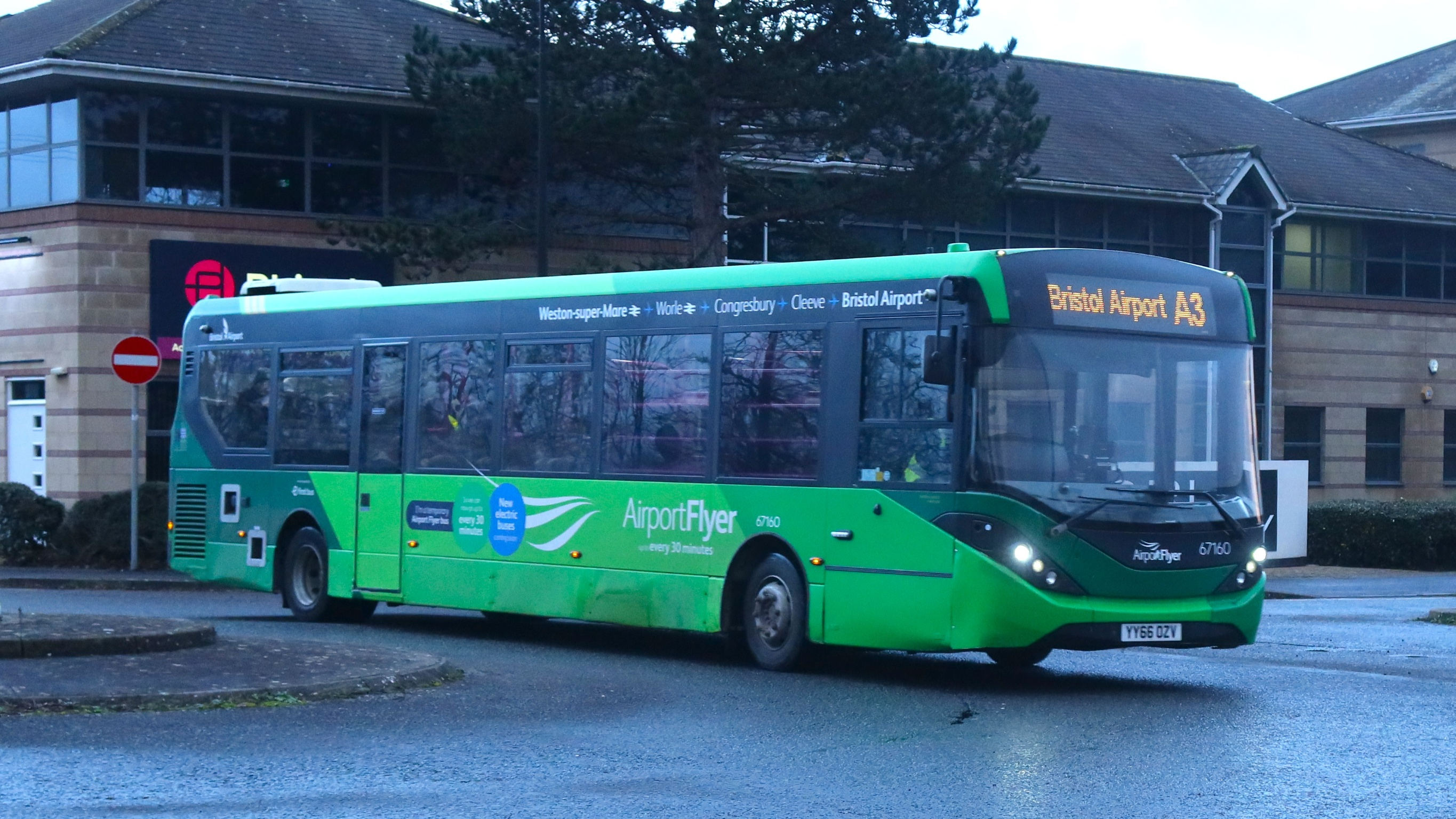

Overview
- Operator: First West of England
- Garage: Weston-super-Mare
- Vehicle: Yutong E12 and Alexander Dennis Enviro200 MMC
- Peak vehicle requirement: 4

Route
- Start: Weston-super-Mare
- Via: Worle; Congresbury; Cleeve; Brockley; Downside
- End: Bristol Airport
- Length: 12.5 miles

Service
- Level: 24 hours daily (No service Christmas Day)
- Frequency: up to every 30 minutes

The A3 operates via Locking Road and Worle Railway Station before operating a limited stop service from St Georges Turn calling at a singlar stop in Congresbury, Cleeve, Brockley and Downside villages.

=== A4 Bath Bus Station to Bristol Airport ===
A4

Overview
- Operator: First West of England
- Garage: Bath
- Vehicles: Alexander Dennis Enviro400 City Integral
- Peak vehicle requirement: 4

Route
- Start: Bath Bus Station
- Via: Keynsham; Hengrove; Highridge
- End: Bristol Airport

Service
- Level: 24 hours daily (No service Christmas Day)
- Frequency: every 60 minutes

The A4 operates from Bath Bus Station via Newbridge, Saltford, Keynsham, Brislington, Hengrove, Highridge, and the A38. Unlike The A1 and A3, the A4 does not operate as a limited stop service, acting as the only direct service from South Bristol and Keynsham to Bath. The A4 became an Airport Flyer route in April 2026, when First Bus bought Bath Bus Company, it was previously branded as the Airdecker.
