= South Gloucestershire Bus & Coach =

Transportation company

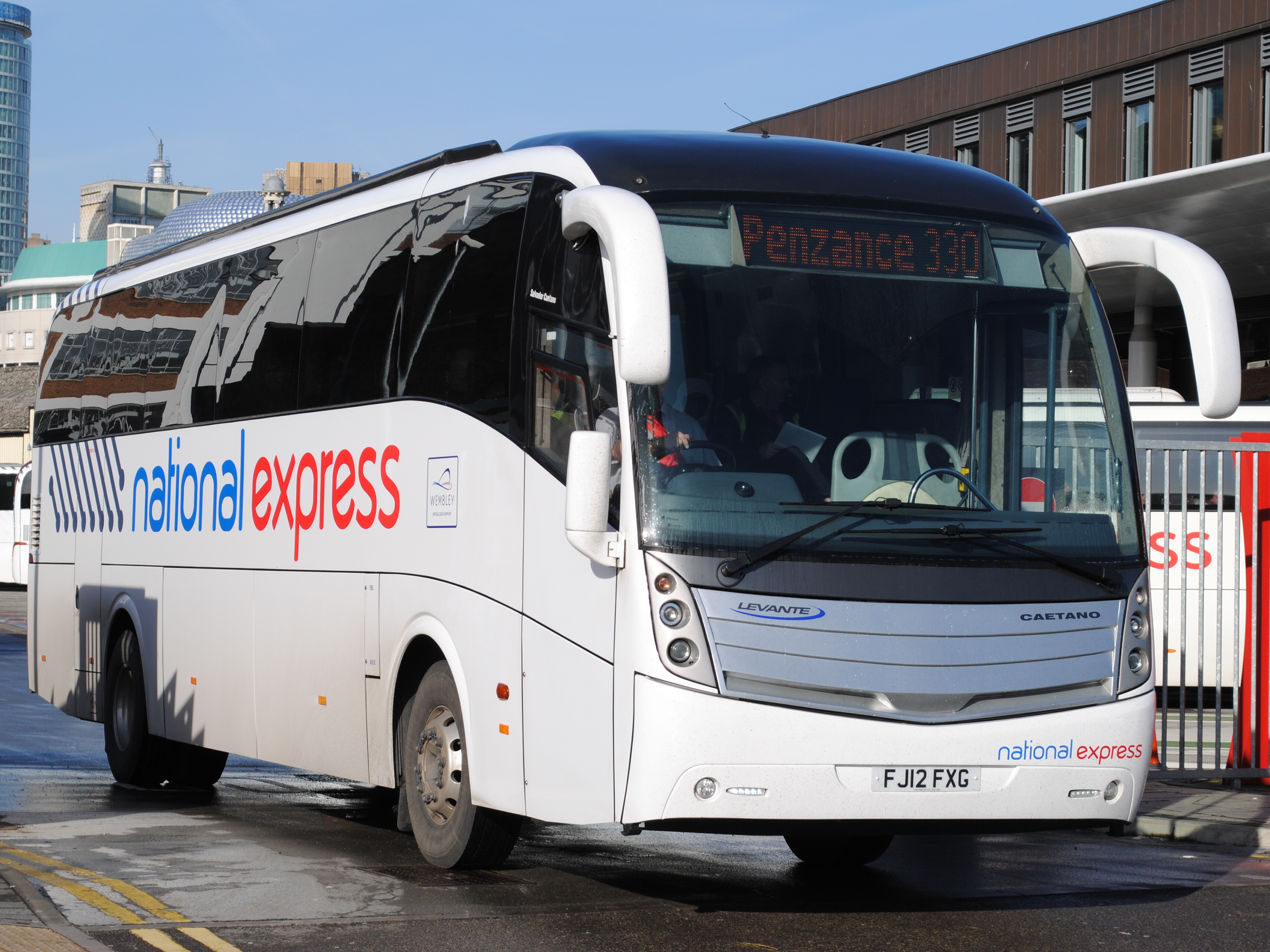
- National Express liveried Caetano Levante bodied Volvo B9R at Birmingham Coach Station in February 2013
- Founded: 1997; 29 years ago
- Ceased operation: November 2019; 6 years ago
- Headquarters: Patchway
- Service area: Bristol; South Gloucestershire
- Service type: Bus & coach services
- Chief executive: Jeffrey R Durbin
- Website: www.stagecoachbus.com

South Gloucestershire Bus & Coach Company Ltd was a bus and coach operator operating school bus services under contract to Bristol City Council and South Gloucestershire Council and coach services under contract to Megabus.

== History ==
South Gloucestershire can trace its history back to 1982 when Roger Durbin set up operations as Durbin’s Coaches. After steadily expanding over the years, in 1994 Durbin's Coaches was sold to Badgerline and incorporated into their Bristol Omnibus Company subsidiary, later being re-branded as First Durbin.

A non-compete clause in the contract of sale prevented Roger Durbin from operating bus services in the Bristol area for three years. Whilst Roger Durbin left the company, Tony Lavoie, the marketing manager stayed with the company, moving to City Line's Lawrence Hill depot as the general manager for the Durbin operations.

After a few months Lavoie left to start up his own bus company, Leisure Travel. By 1997, with a fleet of 24 vehicles, Roger Durbin joined as a partner in the business, and in 1998 the company began trading as South Gloucestershire Bus Company with a blue and white livery. Also during 1998 the pair purchased a local taxi firm which they renamed South Gloucestershire Taxi Company with a similar fleet name as the bus business. Durbin took on the bus side of the business while Lavoie looked after the running of the taxi company. During 1999 the original Durbin’s Coaches business was reacquired from First Bristol, who had continued to trade as Durbin’s Coaches and then First Durbin as a ‘low cost’ unit within First.

The company rapidly expanded over the next few years winning various tenders for supported services from Bristol City Council and South Gloucestershire Council, at one point even operating route 620 from Bath to Stroud. During 2003 the goodwill and custom as well as the majority of the fleet of Eastville Coaches were bought from the proprietor Mr Phillips. A number of newer vehicles were brought in to update the fleet, however after 18 months the original Eastville Coaches began trading again and the coaches in the South Gloucestershire fleet with Eastville Coaches branding lost their fleet name and gained 'www.southgloucestershirebus.co.uk A Durbin Group Company’ fleetnames.

Also during 2003 the taxi operation was separated from the bus operation, which saw Lavoie leave the business.

The company continued to expand, picking up contracts with the University of the West of England (UWE) for student transport, Axa and Orange for staff shuttles, Wessex Trains rail replacement and further tenders from Bristol City and South Gloucestershire Councils.

The fleet mainly consisted of second hand vehicles such as Leyland Lynx and Leyland Titans, and Volvo B10Ms for the coach fleet. There were two Dennis Dart SLFs that were new to Durbin in 2003 for Orange and UWE work. In 2007 South Gloucestershire was named the most un-environmentally-friendly bus operator in the country. It was also named the worst for customer service, although this hasn't been formally recognised since, the level of service has remained poor.

In June 2007 the bus operations of the company were sold to Rotala subsidiary Flights Hallmark. The sale included 68 buses and was completed in stages until 31 March 2008, this being dictated by Bristol City and South Gloucestershire Councils needing to approve the transfer of the routes and because the licence was held in the name of the owners, not the company, so the services had to change operator licences.

The services were slowly rebranded as Wessex Connect, however the majority of the vehicles that Rotala purchased stayed in the blue South Gloucestershire livery and they were gradually disposed of as Rotala were able to replace them. Most of the low floor vehicles from the South Gloucestershire fleet were painted white with dark blue skirts and ended up with staying in Bristol or transferring to Rotala group company Central Connect in Birmingham.

Following the sale South Gloucestershire were left with school services, the 462 commuter service and the Axa 101 service, that both interworked with school services. Since then further corporate staff services have been up in and around Bristol as well as work on behalf of UWE, including shuttle bus and P&R for open days. The fleet has been continually updated since the sale in 2007 with more modern coaches and further second hand buses. All coaches are now white with a new South Gloucestershire fleet name in silver, and school vehicles are gradually being painted into an all over yellow scheme inspired by the purchase of a former Plymouth Citybus school vehicle. The light blue livery is no longer in use as all vehicles have either been sold or painted into the new yellow StudentLink livery.

In October 2019, the business was sold to Stagecoach West with 53 vehicles and the depot.

== National Express ==
In March 2007, South Gloucestershire began operating three weekend journeys on National Express route 040 between Bristol and London, due to increased passenger numbers on this route. In the months leading up to this, the company was providing regular duplicate coaches on route 040 and also other routes such as the 403 from Bath to London and on cross country services from South West England.

During December 2007 South Gloucestershire operated the seasonal route 319 from Bristol to Birmingham. The service was introduced to meet demand over the festive period until January 2008. From March 2008 several more additional weekend journeys were added to the 040 and these were operated by South Gloucestershire. In September 2008 South Gloucestershire began operating their first full-time National Express contract on route 200 between Bristol and Gatwick Airport. For this purpose a fleet of six tri-axle Caetano Levante Scania K340EB6s were purchased, the first new coaches to be operated.

From January 2010 South Gloucestershire began to operate the 040 on a full-time basis after taking over the route from First Somerset & Avon, who could trace back their history to the start of the service. The majority of journeys on the route were worked by the Levantes purchased for the 200, as well as three further examples acquired from National Express. From 2013 the tri-axle coaches began to lose National Express branding so the use of standard coaches on the 040 is more common.

Further expansion came during August when the company took over operation of the 401/2, Wells/Frome to London and 403, Bath to London, which had previously been operated by First Somerset & Avon. A new fleet of 12 Caetano Levante bodied Volvo B9Rs were reacquired for use on both the 200 and 401-3 services, although they were delayed arriving so the fleet used on the 200 service covered on the 403 because they were Low-emission zone compliant. This saw the use of spare coaches on the 200 service for a few weeks until all of the new coaches hadarrived.

In May 2011 the Friday and Sunday only service 318 between Bristol and Birmingham was taken on having previously been operated by Applegates Coaches. During August 2011 the operations of Hookways of Meeth collapsed and South Gloucestershire provided emergency cover on routes 339 from Westward Ho! to Grimsby and 502 from Westward Ho! to London. In October the services were taken on, on a permanent basis and four new Volvo B9R/Caetano Levante were delivered in May 2012 to allow the upgrade of the routes;

January 2012 saw South Gloucestershire begin operating some journeys on route 444 from Gloucester to London, with Whittles covering other runs. This was previously operated by Stagecoach West's Gloucester depot. An outstation was set up in Gloucester and a further 4 new Volvo B9R/Caetano Levante delivered for the service. In January 2013 operation of route 444 was transferred to Bennetts Coaches with South Gloucestershire gaining additional journeys on service 403 which were added to the timetable that month. I the same month, South Gloucestershire gained a further National Express contract for route 330 between Penzance and Nottingham after the previous operator, Premiere Travel, went into administration. A former Premiere Travel Levante also joined the fleet.

Route 318 was initially reduced to operating on Sundays only from the start of the new National Express timetable commencing on 13 May 2013, with the Friday service not operating after 10 May. However, by 24 May the Friday service on the route had been reinstated. It was however withdrawn again after 11 October 2013 meaning that the route now operates on Sundays only.

During the summer of 2013 the company gained further diagrams on the National Express network including the former Yourbus diagram on route 040. This saw South Gloucestershire operate every journey on the route apart from four Friday/Sunday only diagrams which were operated by Chalfont Coaches. Other services introduced included a seasonal 317 service which operated a once daily departure between Bristol and Lymington and a service between London and Leeds Castle. As of September 2013 all of these journeys have now been withdrawn. September also saw South Gloucestershire take on a diagram on service 509 between London and Cardiff which had previously been operated National Express Operations. From November service 302 between Bristol and Northampton has also been taken over from Arriva MK Metro, coincidentally this had previously been operated by FirstGroup.

The company acquired further National Express work during summer 2014. Whilst the company's diagrams on route 200 between Bristol and Gatwick were slightly cut back in June 2014, route 337 between Paignton and Rugby was taken over from MK Metro and in July 2014, the company started to operate route 401 between Bristol, Swindon, Heathrow Airport and London.

A further service introduced on 31 March 2015 was route 301 between Bristol University and Oxford and operated alongside route 302, providing three journeys a day between Bristol and Oxford. In addition, from June 2015 the company took over Chalfont Coaches' Friday and Sunday workings on service 040 meaning that all journeys on this route were now contracted to South Gloucestershire Bus & Coach.

South Gloucestershire had a varied fleet of National Express coaches that included:

- 1 Scania K114IB4/Irizar PB
- 6 Scania K340EB4/Caetano Levante
- 9 Scania K340EB6/Caetano Levante
- 5 VDL SB4000/Van Hool T9
- 20 Volvo B9R/Caetano Levante
- 4 Volvo B12B/Plaxton Panther

South Gloucestershire operated on 12 National Express routes:

- 040: Bristol to London
- 200: Bristol to Gatwick Airport via Reading and Heathrow Airport
- 301: Bristol University to Oxford via Bristol, Bath, Chippenham, Corsham and Swindon
- 302: Bristol to Northampton via Bath Spa, Swindon and Oxford
- 318: Bristol to Birmingham via Gloucester and Cheltenham Spa (Sundays only)
- 330: Penzance to Nottingham
- 337: Paignton to Rugby
- 339: Westward Ho! to Grimsby
- 401: Bristol to London via University of the West of England, Swindon & Heathrow Airport
- 402: Frome to London via Trowbridge, Newbury & Heathrow Airport
- 403: Bath to London via Chippenham & Heathrow Airport
- 502: Barnstaple to London
- 509: Cardiff to London via Newport

On 1 May 2017, South Gloucestershire ceased to be a National Express operator with the services to be taken over by Edwards Coaches.

== Megabus ==
On 1 May 2017, South Gloucestershire commenced operating four Megabus services.

- M6a: Barnstaple to London via Taunton, Bristol & Heathrow Airport
- M14: Gloucester to London
- M25: Cardiff to Gatwick Airport via Heathrow
- M38: Barnstaple to Nottingham

== Bus routes ==
South Gloucestershire's only scheduled bus services is route 462, which runs at peak hour times from Emersons Green, Mangotsfield and Bromley Heath to either Bristol Temple Meads railway station or Clifton via Bristol city centre. One return diagram operates in each direction between Emersons Green and Clifton Triangle whilst the remaining journeys operate between Emersons Green and Bristol Temple Meads Railway Station. A variant of this route, service 462A was introduced in April 2009 consisting of one return journey in each direction and running between Downend and Bristol Temple Meads on the morning journey and Temple Meads to Emersons Green via Downend and Mangotsfield on the return journey. In April 2011 the morning journey was withdrawn and the evening journey reduced to school days only before eventually being withdrawn altogether.

Additionally, South Gloucestershire Bus & Coach previously operated route 680 which runs during term time from Frampton Cotterell to Filton via North and South Yate, Coalpit Heath and University of the West England. This service was also available for use by the general public although the service only operated during term time on college days. The route was taken over by Eurotaxis in September 2014.

South Gloucestershire also operate route 101 for Friends Life employees from Stoke Gifford, to Lewin's Mead via the A4174 and M32. This service is not available to the general public.

South Gloucestershire was the official provider of transport for the Bristol International Balloon Fiesta and operated two routes each year. Buses ran from Bristol Temple Meads railway station to the Fiesta Site every 10 minutes from around 09:00 until 23:00 across four days. A second service operates hourly from Clifton Down to the Fiesta site. However, in 2013 this contract was taken over by First Bristol.

== See also ==
- Bus services in Bristol
