= Wessex Bus =

Bus operator in the West of England

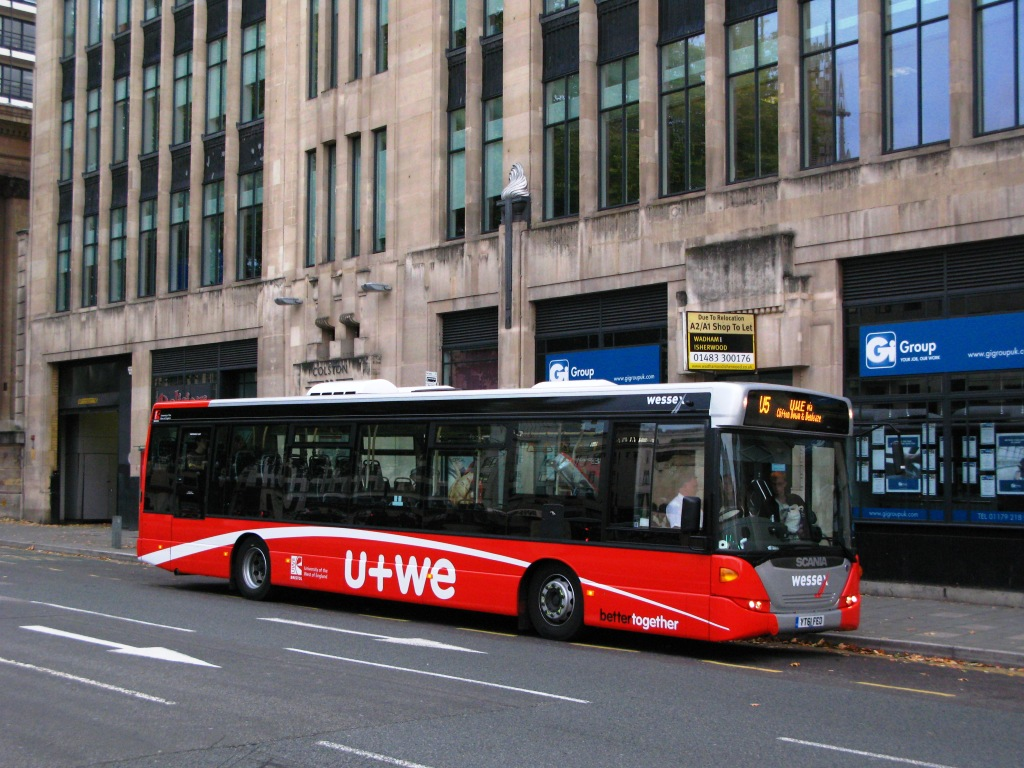
- Scania OmniLink in Bristol in 2011, with UWE livery
- Parent: Rotala
- Founded: April 2007
- Defunct: 1 September 2018
- Headquarters: Avonmouth
- Service area: Bristol; Bath
- Service type: Bus services
- Routes: 14 (July 2018)
- Hubs: Southmead Hospital
- Fleet: 105 (2017)
- Chief executive: Steven Watkins
- Website: www.wessexbus.com

Wessex Bus was a bus operator in the West of England that operated from June 2007 until September 2018.

== History ==
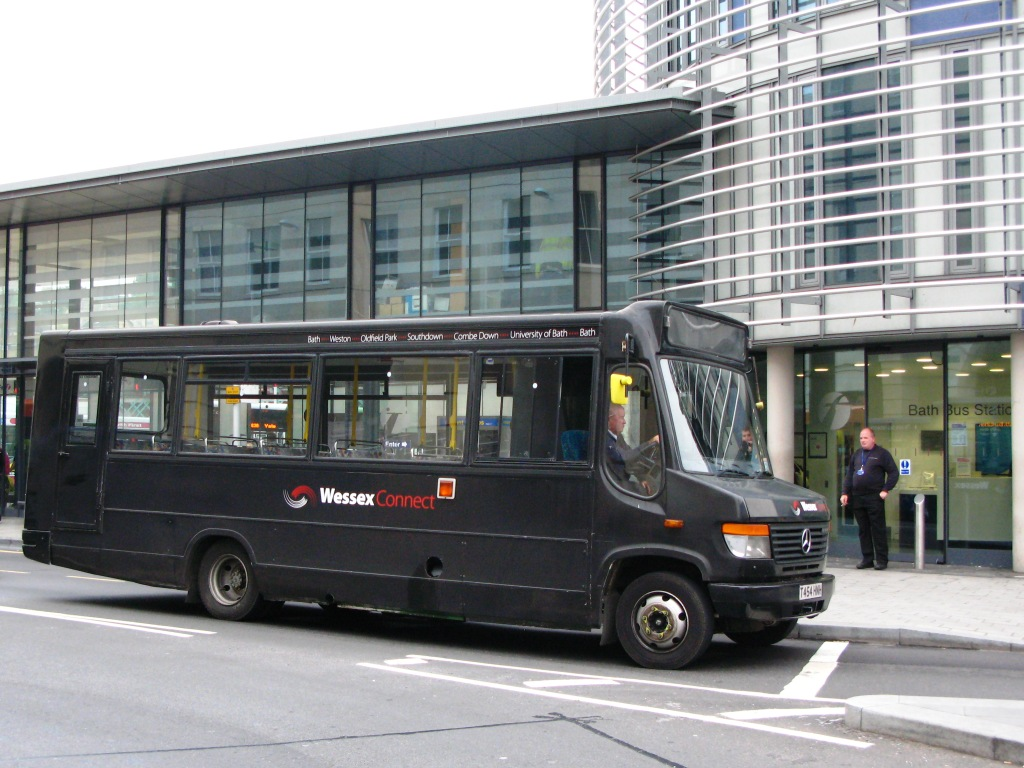
Wessex Connect Alexander ALX100 bodied Mercedes-Benz Vario at Bath bus station in September 2010

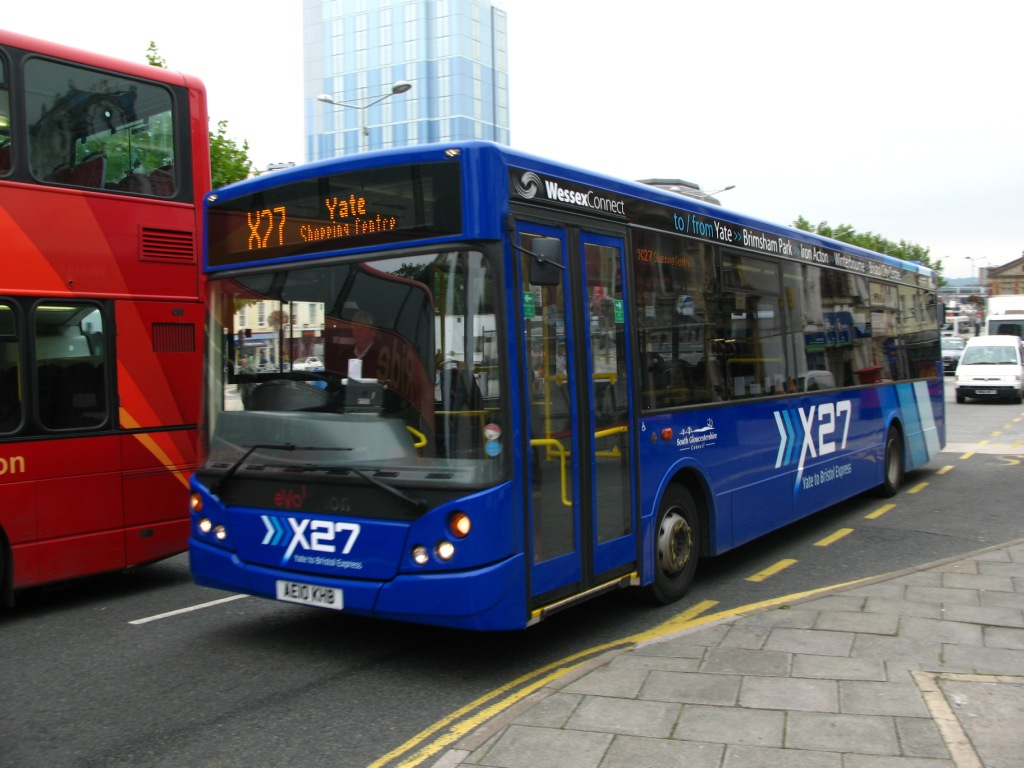
Wessex Connect branded MCV Evolution bodied Dennis Dart in September 2010

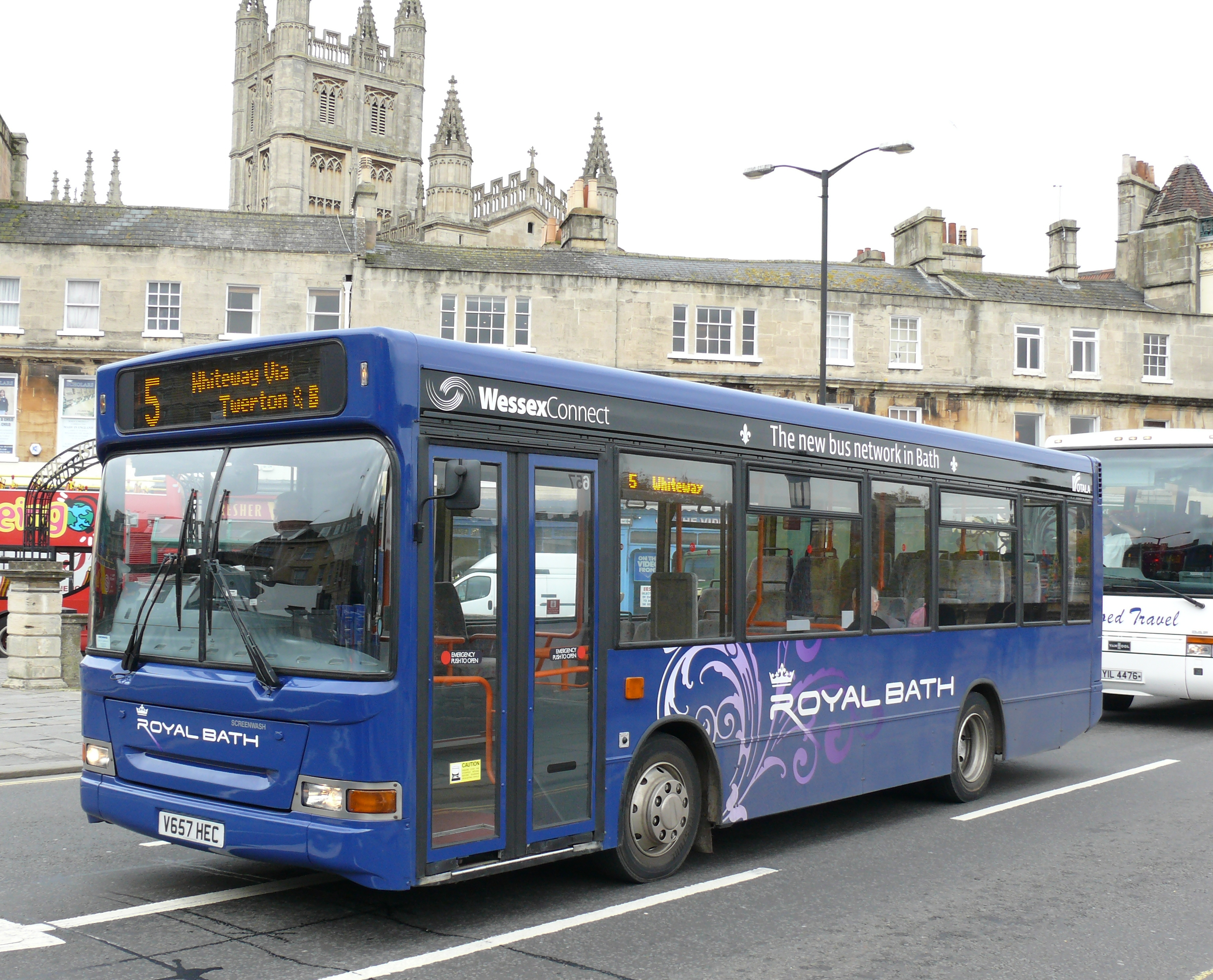
Royal Bath branded Plaxton Pointer 2 bodied Dennis Dart SLF in Bath in September 2010

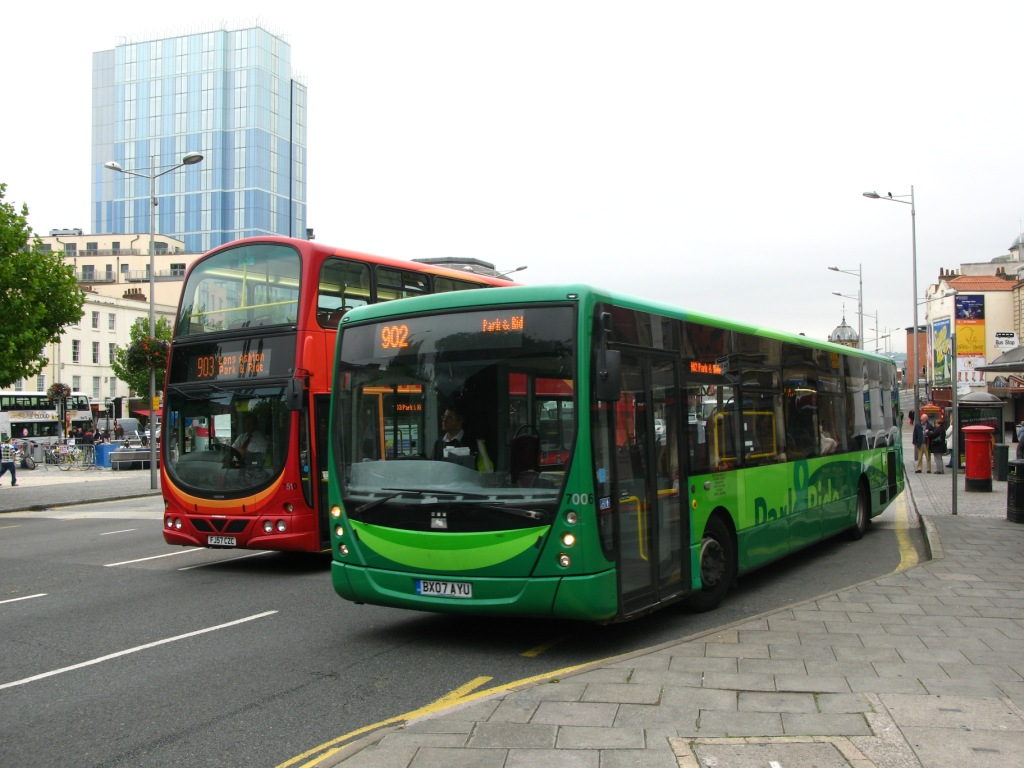
Park & Ride liveried Plaxton Centro bodied Volvo B7RLE in September 2010

In June 2007 the bus side of the South Gloucestershire Bus & Coach company was purchased by Rotala subsidiary Flights Hallmark, trading as Wessex Connect. The purchase included 68 buses and was completed in stages until 31 March 2008, this being dictated by the need for Bristol City and South Gloucestershire councils to approve the transfer of the routes.

In September 2011, Wessex moved into a new depot which was a former timber yard on St Andrew's Road, Avonmouth. The move allowed Wessex to set up a new regional head office for the South West operations, where all the maintenance requirements could be met. The previous depot, which was owned by South Gloucestershire Bus & Coach, was operating at near full capacity following the growth of both businesses.

In 2017, the fleet size stated by the company was 105 with a second depot in Keynsham.

Following the loss of most of its local authority subsidised services to other operators, Wessex ceased operations on 1 September 2018, with eight services, nine vehicles and 60 employees transferring to Stagecoach West. One route (the 42 from Odd Down Park and Ride to the Royal United Hospital) was taken over by First West of England.

== Wessex Star ==
A major contract included with the purchase of South Gloucestershire Bus & Coach was the University of the West of England (UWE) Student Shuttle services. The UWE Flyer service was one of the first routes that Wessex Connect ran for South Gloucestershire, and soon after the Student Shuttle and Bower Aston shuttle. From September 2007, UWE in conjunction with Rotala developed a network of routes to link the satellite campuses of Bower Ashton, St Matthias and Glenside with Frenchay campus and student accommodation on a cost contract basis. The services were branded as Ulink.

The services proved popular with staff and students at UWE, and passenger numbers in September 2008 were around 6,000 per day. By September 2011, the network had been re-branded as Wessex Red and had grown from three routes requiring five buses in 2007 to eight routes requiring 26, with regular duplicate vehicles in operation particularly on route U4.

In 2012 the UWE branding was replaced by Wessex Red. The U prefix to the route numbers was replaced by a '1' (e.g. U1 became 11) to make the network appeal to the ordinary travelling public as well as students.

On 1 September 2014 Wessex Red was renamed Wessex Star. In November 2015 a new route commenced named The One, followed by The One 2. The latter was withdrawn in December 2016, and all Wessex Star services were withdrawn by July 2017.

== Uniconnect ==
On 11 May 2009, Wessex Connect started operating a branded Uni-Connect U18 service between University of Bath and Lower Oldfield Park via Bath city centre. All commercially operated bus services from the university were withdrawn in September 2017.

== Wessex Bath ==
Due to the success of the Uni-Connect services that Wessex operated in Bath, further services were launched duplicating existing First Somerset & Avon routes. On 27 September 2010, Wessex commenced operation of new routes 5 and 10 under the Royal Bath brand name. Running to Twerton and Southdown respectively, they were in addition to frequent services on both of those routes run by First.

On 3 October 2010, Wessex Connect took over operation of route 620 between Tetbury and Bath, after previous operator Cotswold Green withdrew from the route.

== Park & ride ==
Wessex operated two park & ride services in Bristol:

- 902 Portway park and ride under contract to Bristol City Council
- 505 Long Ashton park and ride under contract to National Car Parks

The company's bids were unsuccessful for the re-tender of these contracts and in April 2012, they passed to CT Plus and First Bristol respectively. In September 2014, Wessex commenced operating a new park and ride service, the 901 between Portway and Clifton; this service ceasing in September 2016. It also operated the 505 service between Southmead Hospital and Long Ashton park & ride.
