= Rotala =

Bus operating company in England

- Company type: Private company
- Traded as: LSE: ROL (2005-2024)
- Industry: Bus & coach services
- Founded: March 2005
- Headquarters: Oldbury, Birmingham, England
- Key people: Bob Dunn (Chairman); Simon Dunn (CEO)
- Revenue: £85 million (2022)
- Operating income: £4 million (2022)
- Owner: Simon Dunn; Bob Dunn; John Gunn
- Subsidiaries: Diamond Bus Ltd. (West Midlands); Diamond Bus East Midlands; Diamond Bus North West; Diamond Bus South East (Hallmark Connections Ltd.); Preston Bus
- Website: www.rotalaplc.com

Rotala Limited is a company established in 2005, which owns a number of bus operators in England. It was listed on the Alternative Investment Market from 2005 until 2024.

== History ==
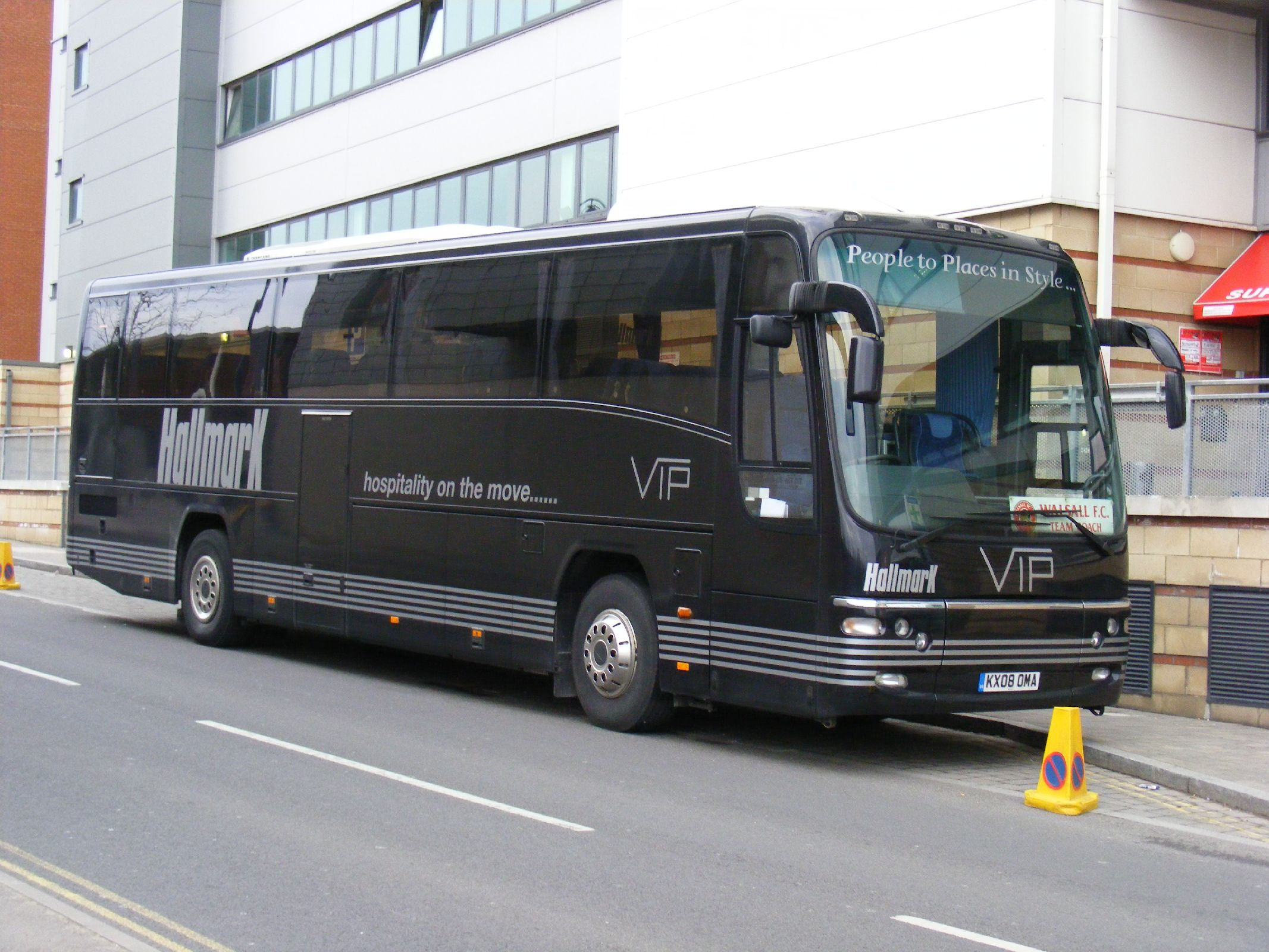
Hallmark Plaxton bodied Volvo B12B in March 2010

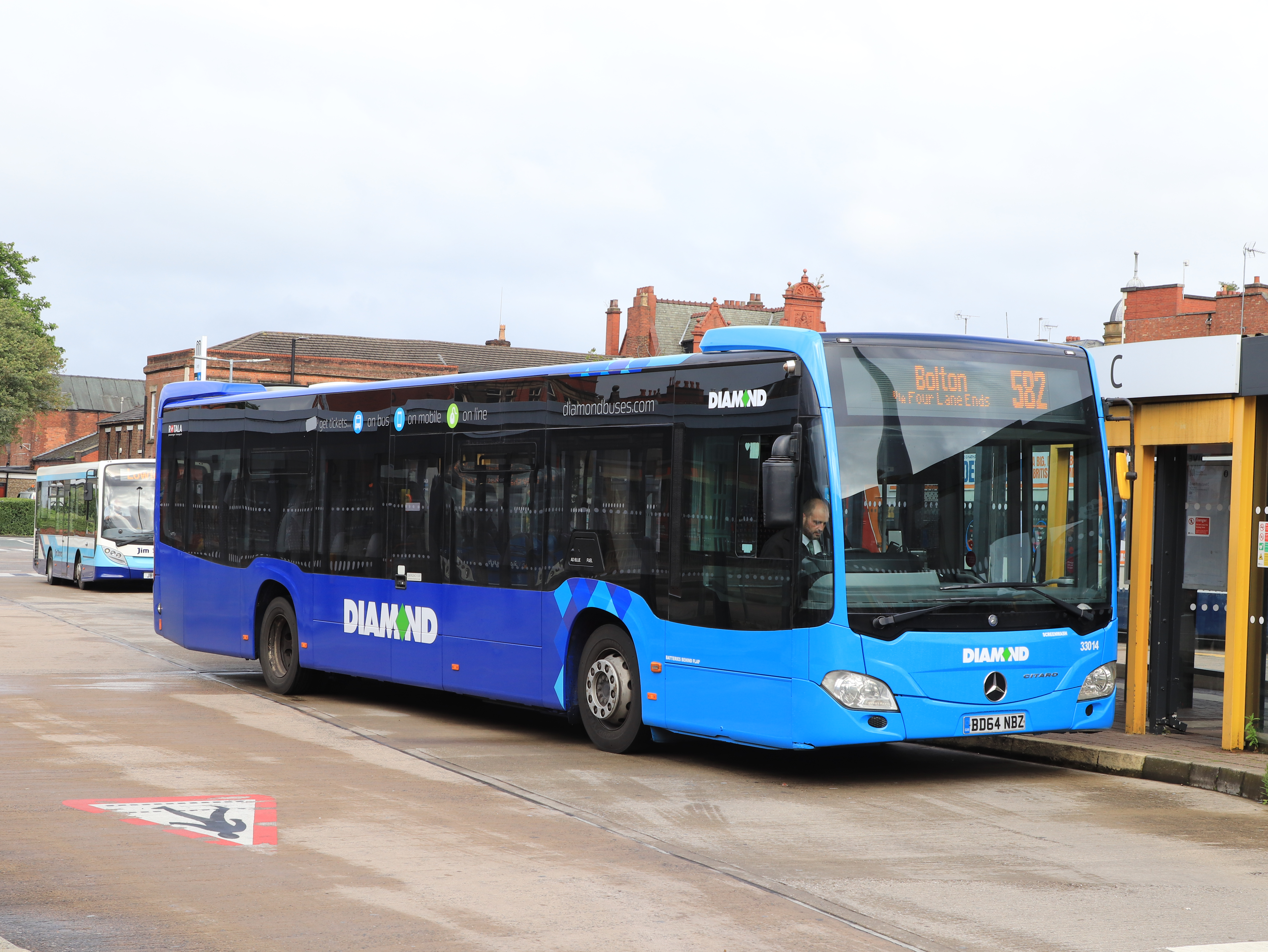
Diamond North West Mercedes-Benz Citaro, at Leigh bus station, August 2019

In March 2005, Rotala was listed on the Alternative Investment Market. In August 2005 it agreed on terms to purchase Flights Hallmark.

== Acquisitions ==
In October 2006, the business of Zak's Buses, Birmingham was purchased and rebranded Central Connect; this was followed in December 2006 by Birmingham Motor Traction (20 vehicles). In June 2007 Ludlow's of Halesowen (21 vehicles) was purchased followed in July 2007 by North Birmingham Busways (26 vehicles) of Erdington.

In April 2007, Flights Hallmark commenced operating services in Bristol under the Wessex Connect brand after winning the contract to provide two Bristol park & ride services, and in June 2007 purchased the bus routes of South Gloucestershire Bus & Coach with 68 buses.

In March 2008, the Go West Midlands business was purchased. At this stage Rotala merged all its Birmingham based operations under the Diamond Bus brand. In January 2011, Preston Bus was purchased from Stagecoach.

In January 2013, Rotala purchased depots in Kidderminster and Redditch from First Midland Red with 36 buses. These were integrated into the Diamond Bus operation. In March 2015, Rotala acquired South Lancs Travel from D&G Bus and Julian Peddle and rebranded it Diamond Bus North West.

In June 2015, the 17 vehicle Wings Luxury Travel operation in London was purchased and integrated with Rotala's existing Heathrow operation. In December 2015, Rotala purchased the Heathrow-based operations of OFJ Connections.

In July 2017, Hanson's Local Buses in Birmingham was purchased followed in August 2017 by the route service business of Go-Goodwins in Manchester and the Hotel Hoppa business from National Express in October 2017. Earlier the same year the majority of Wednesfield operations and several vehicles were purchased from Arriva Midlands.

In February 2018, Central Buses in Birmingham was purchased and integrated into Diamond Bus. Wessex Bus ceased operations on 1 September 2018, with eight services and nine vehicles taken over by Stagecoach West.

In August 2019, Rotala purchased First Greater Manchester's Bolton depot with 18 routes and integrated into Diamond Bus North West.

In January 2022, the purchase of Claribel Coaches of Birmingham was announced allowing the current owners to focus on the associated Birmingham International Coaches business. Diamond confirmed that the Claribels name would not be retained and all services and buses would be operated under the Diamond Bus name from April 2022. A number of routes, however, were transferred to National Express West Midlands due to the expiration of the tenders operated on behalf of Transport for West Midlands.

In April 2022, the acquisition of the bus operations of Johnsons Coaches, which operates under the Excelbus brand, were purchased. All bus operations will operate under the Diamond Bus brand from 29 May 2022 and will be operated from Redditch depot. The private hire and coach operations are not included in the deal and will continue to trade as Johnsons Coaches. Some Johnsons routes were started early "to assist Johnsons with some of their current operational difficulties".

In August 2022, it was announced the Rotala Group had purchased Midland Classic, marking Rotala's entry into the East Midlands. Midland Classic was rebranded Diamond East Midlands, with buses painted into Diamond fleet livery and the company directly controlled from Rotala's Tividale headquarters.

In January 2024, Rotala delisted from the Alternative Investment Market with directors Bob Dunn, Simon Dunn and John Gunn purchasing the business in a management buyout.

== Former operations ==
Rotala's first acquisition was Surrey Connect in 2005, when Centra decided to sell its Addlestone operation. The business was purchased by Flights Hallmark. Surrey Connect developed and continued to grow and won contracts for a number of Surrey County Council tendered routes. Rotala sold the company in June 2007 to Wiltax. A few months later the Wiltax operations were acquired by Arriva.
