= Bristol buses =

Bristol buses may refer to

- Bristol, the make of bus made by Bristol Commercial Vehicles
- Bristol, the trading name of Bristol Omnibus Company, which operated buses in Bristol, Gloucestershire and parts of Somerset and Wiltshire in England
- Buses in Bristol, bus services operated in Bristol, England
