= South Gloucestershire (disambiguation) =

South Gloucestershire is a unitary authority in south west England.

South Gloucestershire may also refer to:

- South Gloucestershire Council, the governing body of the unitary authority
- South Gloucestershire (UK Parliament constituency), which existed 1950-1983
- South Gloucestershire Bus & Coach, a British bus company
- the south part of Gloucestershire
