= Buses in Bristol =

Bus services in Bristol, England

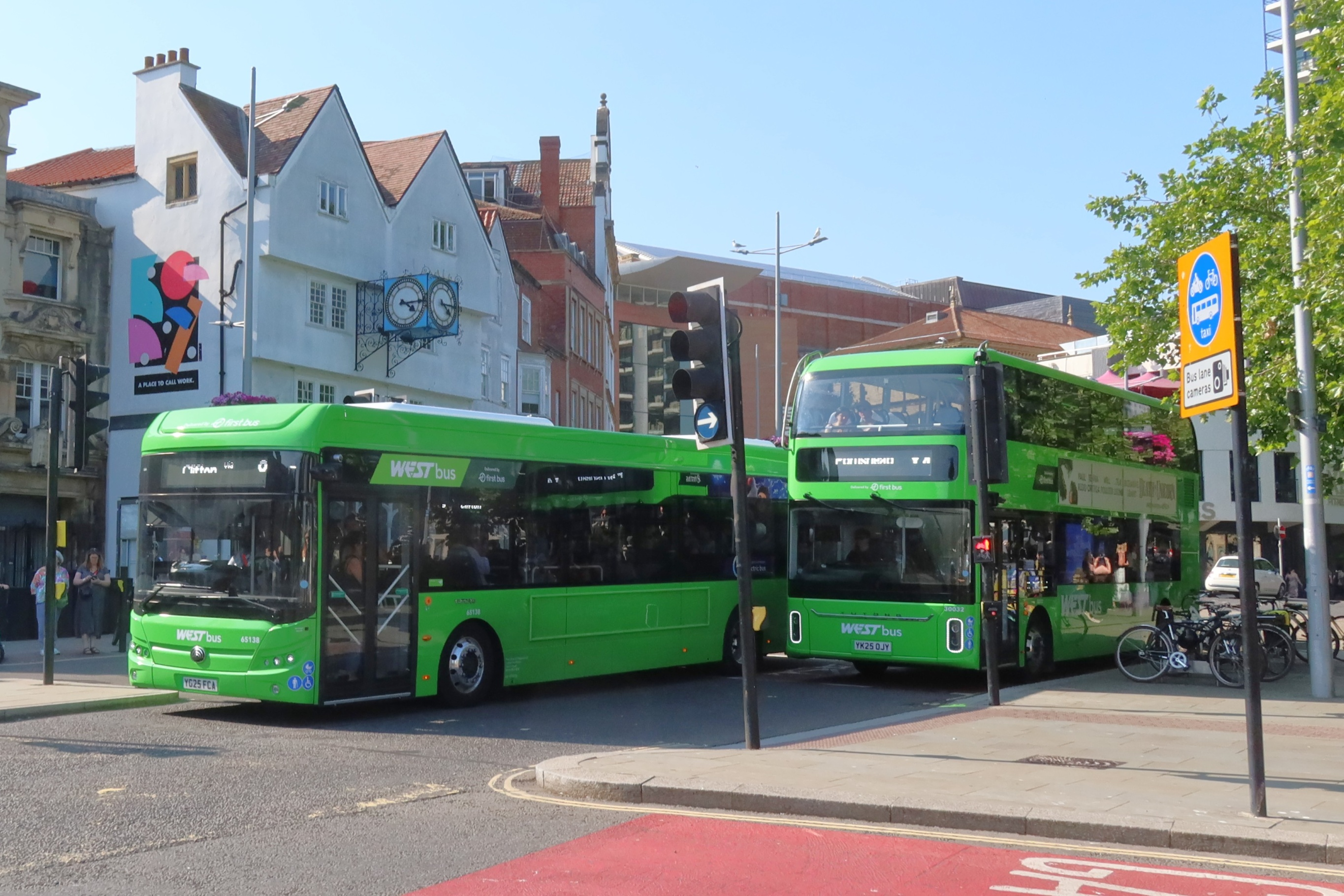
First West of England electric buses passing the former Bristol Omnibus Company's offices in Bristol city centre. They are in the green livery that is being adopted for bus services in the West of England Combined Authority area which includes Bristol. (Photographed 2025)

Buses are the main form of public transport in Bristol, England. Most bus services are operated by First West of England. Other companies offering services include The Big Lemon, Stagecoach West and Newport Bus.

== History ==
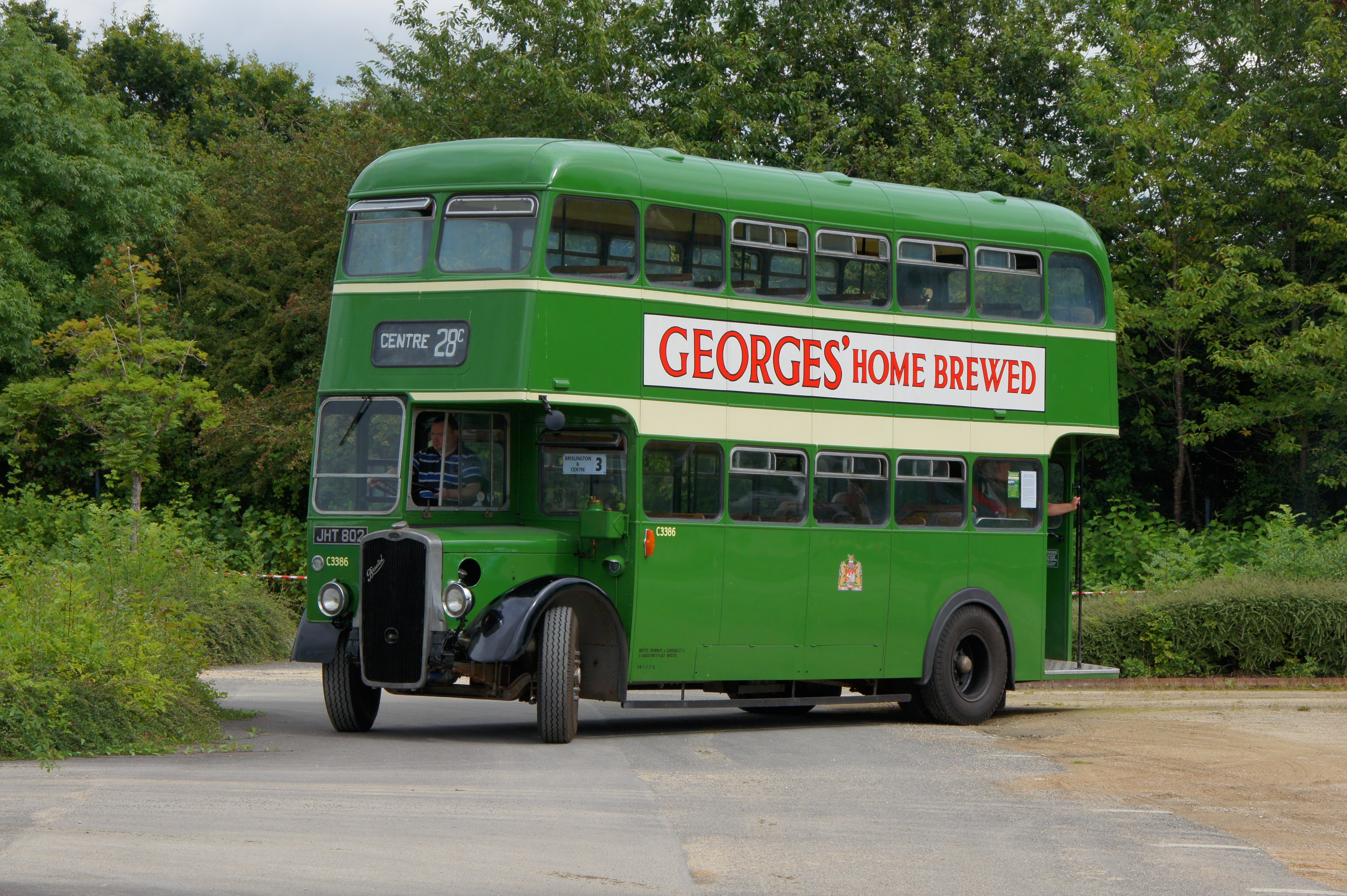
A preserved Bristol K5G Bristol Omnibus Company bus

Horse-drawn omnibus services in Bristol were started in 1887 by the Bristol Tramways & Carriage Company, with a service from the Victoria Rooms (connecting with the trams) to Clifton. The omnibuses were replaced by motor buses from 1906, first on a service from the city centre to Clifton.

From 1887 to 1986, Bristol Tramways (renamed Bristol Omnibus Company in 1957) had an almost complete monopoly of bus services in and from Bristol. The exceptions were in the 1920s, when Greyhound Motors provided competition until taken over by Bristol Tramways in 1928; a few small independent operators, the last of which, the Dundry Pioneer, was acquired in 1950; and Red & White Services, which started joint services with Bristol Omnibus Company to South Wales when the Severn Bridge opened in 1966.

Between 1937 and 1978 Bristol Omnibus Company was the operating partner in Bristol Joint Service (BJS), a joint undertaking with Bristol Corporation which controlled bus services within the city (and initially also its trams). The company owned and operated the buses, and shared revenues with the Corporation. BJS included services to suburbs outside the city limits (e.g. Filton, Patchway, Staple Hill and Kingswood).

Bus services expanded steadily between the wars. Between 1938 and 1941 Bristol's tramways were abandoned, and buses replaced the tram routes.

Bristol Tramways was state-owned from 1948. Expansion of services continued, to serve the new estates built on the edges of the city. But from 1954 passenger numbers started to decline. Most services started from the Centre, Prince Street or Old Market, although the tram replacement services started between 1938 and 1941 were mostly cross-city routes. In 1958 routes were linked, so that almost all routes ran across the city. This was to reduce congestion caused by standing buses in the central area, and also to provide better access to the new Broadmead shopping area.

In 1969 the company, now known as Bristol Omnibus Company, was transferred to the National Bus Company.

By 1973, growing congestion was again creating delays and unreliable timing on the long cross-city routes, and some services were again split. In 1978 the end of Bristol Joint Services enabled city services to be linked with routes in the eastern suburbs which were well outside the city boundaries. In 1981, limited stop express services were started to the outer suburbs, initially under the Clipper brand. Also in 1981 the NBC's Market Analysis Project triggered more changes, with the abandonment of some long-established routes.

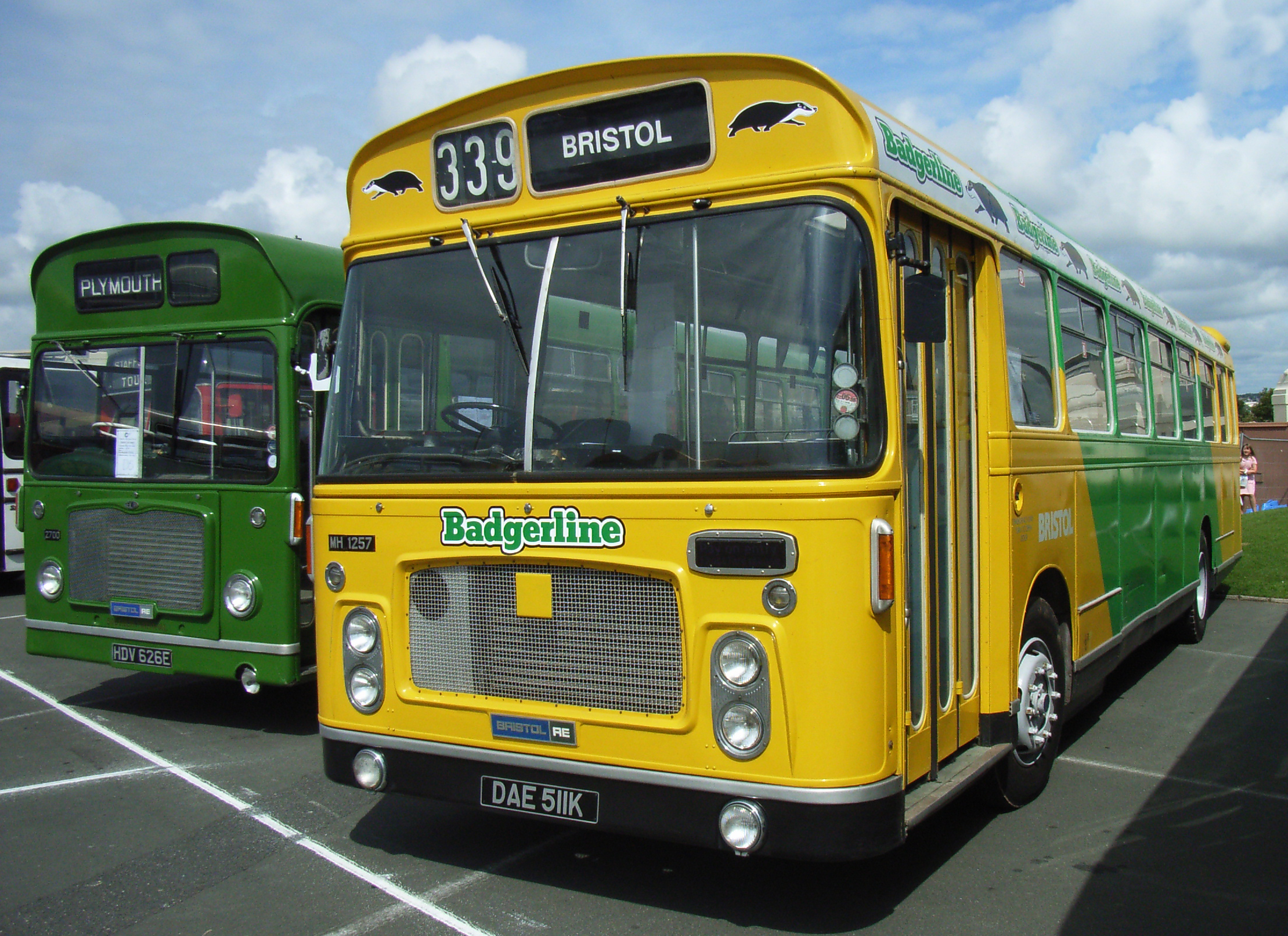
A Badgerline bus

In 1980 the Thatcher government embarked on a programme of privatisation and deregulation of bus services. In preparation the company was split into two operating units in 1983: the city services, which in 1985 adopted the brand Bristol City Line, and the country services, which in 1986 became a separate company, Badgerline Limited. Badgerline was sold to its management in 1986, and the original company was sold in 1987 to Midland Red West, who kept the City Line brand.

Deregulation meant that Badgerline was able to begin bus services within the city, in competition with City Line. However, in 1988 Midland Red West was itself acquired by Badgerline, so that Bristol's bus services were again controlled by a single company.

In 1995 Badgerline merged with GRT Group to become FirstBus, later renamed FirstGroup. First adopted a policy of common branding, and the City Line and Badgerline brands were dropped.

In 1998 bus services were extended to serve the new out-of-town shopping centre at Cribbs Causeway, where a bus station was built.

A few small independent operators have competed with Badgerline, City Line and FirstGroup since deregulation. Bugler Coaches ran a few tendered local services from 1988. Abus began with a competing service to Keynsham in 1991. South Gloucestershire Bus & Coach built up a small network of local services from 1997 until it was taken over in 2007 by Wessex Bus, which ceased operations in 2018.

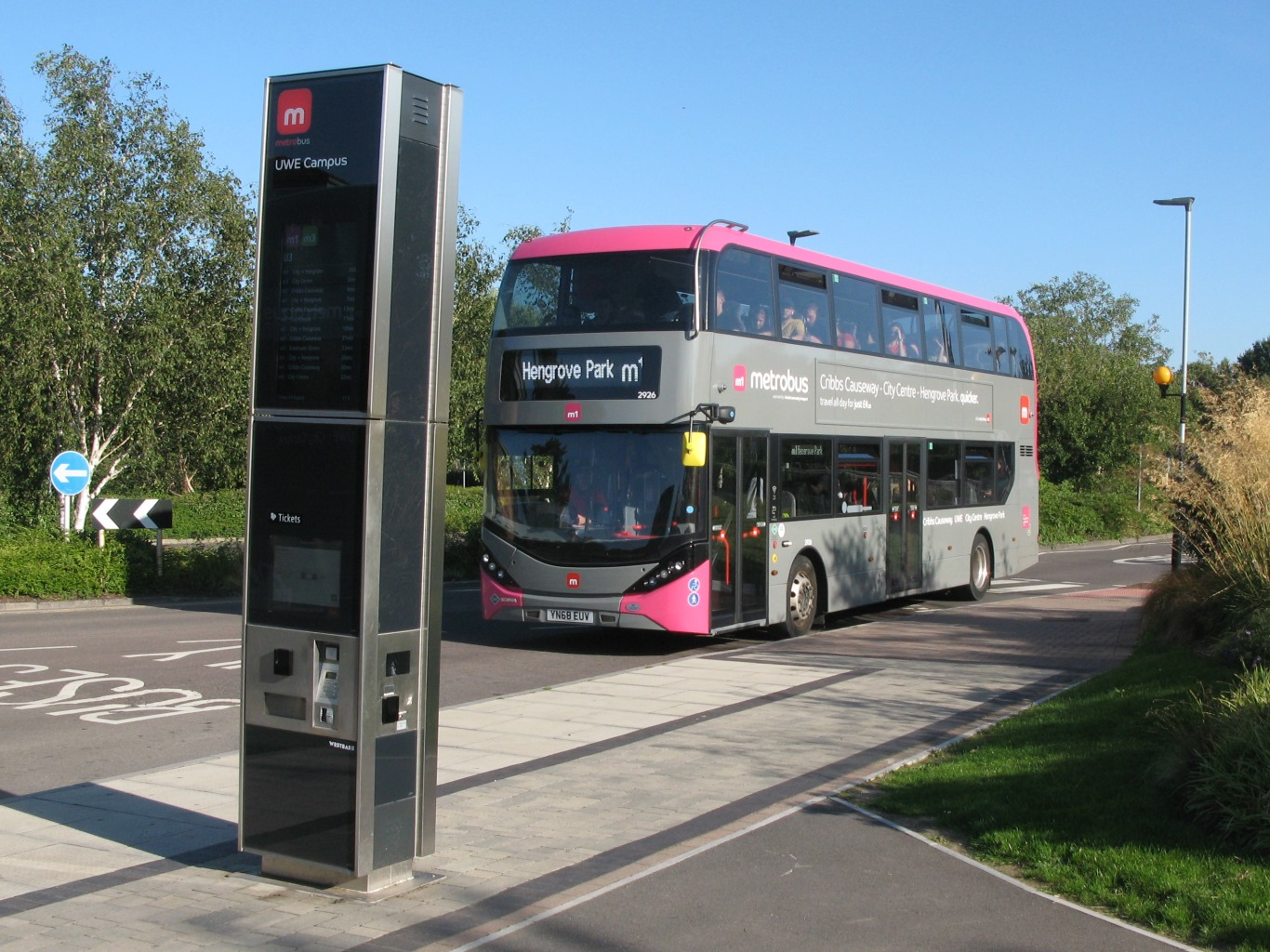
A metrobus service at the University of the West of England (2019)

In 2018, services began on the first route of the Metrobus limited-stop network. By 2023 the network had expanded to four routes, connecting the city centre with Cribbs Causeway, Long Ashton park & ride, Emersons Green, the Frenchay campus of the University of the West of England, and Bristol Parkway railway station. These services are all operated by First.

Between 2016/17 and 2021/22, the distance covered by Bristol buses fell by 30%.

== Coach services ==
National Express and FlixBus services' city centre terminus is Bristol bus station.

== Night services ==
Prior to 24 March 2013 there were 6 night buses (N1, N2, N3, N4, N5, N6) running across the Bristol area every Saturday and Sunday morning midnight until 6am operated by Wessex Bus, this was at a cost of £40,000 a year to Bristol City Council. This agreement was subsequently replaced by Bristol City Council to subsidise First Bristol to run buses six nights a week, with an initial subsidy of £60,000, and a view to First taking on the services on a commercial basis once they became established.

Night services were withdrawn during the COVID-19 pandemic., although by 2025, night services had restarted. These are routes 39, 43, 48, 49, 70, 75, 76, U1 and U3.

== Park and ride ==
There are three park & ride services operating in Bristol: to the city centre from the A4 Portway, A4 Bath Road, and Long Ashton park & ride sites. The sites are operational all year round from Monday to Saturday.

- 9: Brislington Park & Ride to Portway Park & Ride via City Centre
- m2: Long Ashton Park & Ride to City Centre
- 505: Long Ashton Park & Ride to Southmead Hospital

Two smaller Park & Ride sites are served by local bus services rather than a dedicated P&R bus service.

- Lyde Green (served by 86, 49/49x, m3/m3x)
- Yate (served by 86, Y1, Y2, Y6)

== Airport services ==
The Airport Flyer (A1) operates a frequent service on one route from Bristol bus station, Bristol city centre and Temple Meads station to Bristol Airport, operated by First West of England. The A4 runs from Bath to the airport via Keynsham and South Bristol, also operated by First West of England.

== Bristol bus station ==
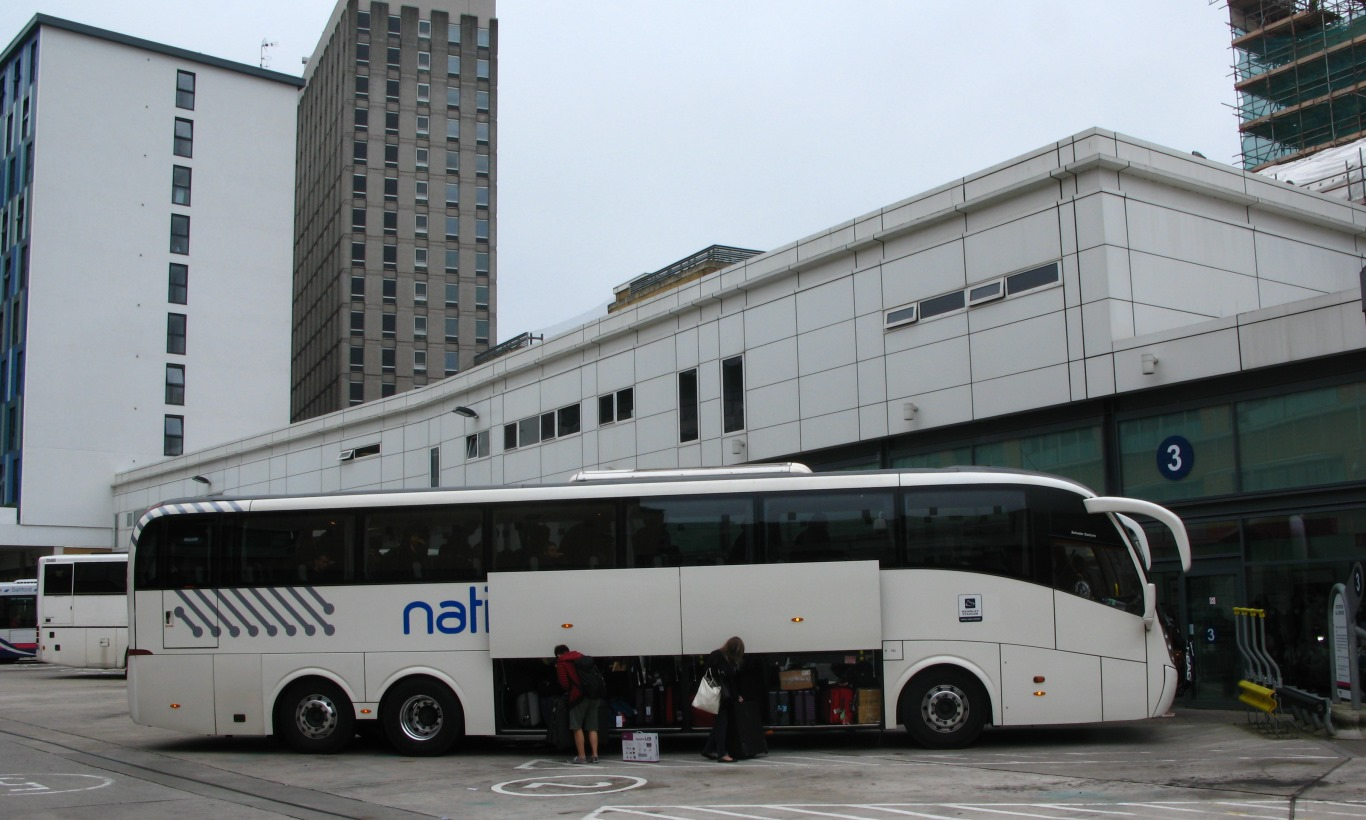
A National Express coach service in Bristol bus station (2010)

The Bristol bus station is at Marlborough Street, near the Broadmead shopping area. It was opened in 1958, and was redeveloped in 2006.

The station is managed by First West of England. There are 19 bays. The station has a First Travel shop, National Express shop, National Express information desk, a café, shop, security office and toilets.

The bus station is used by the Bristol Airport Flyer service to the airport, most First Somerset & Avon express (X) and country services, and Stagecoach South West services to Taunton, Exeter and Plymouth. National Express services, as well as some services by other operators to destinations such as Yate and Cheddar, also use the station.

== See also ==
- Public transport in Bristol

== Sources ==
- Hulin, P (1974) Bristol's Buses Published by the author
- Curtis, C and Walker, M (2007) Bristol Omnibus Services: The Green Years Millstream Books ISBN 978-0-948975-80-6
