= Portway park and ride =

Bus service in Bristol, England

Portway Park and Ride
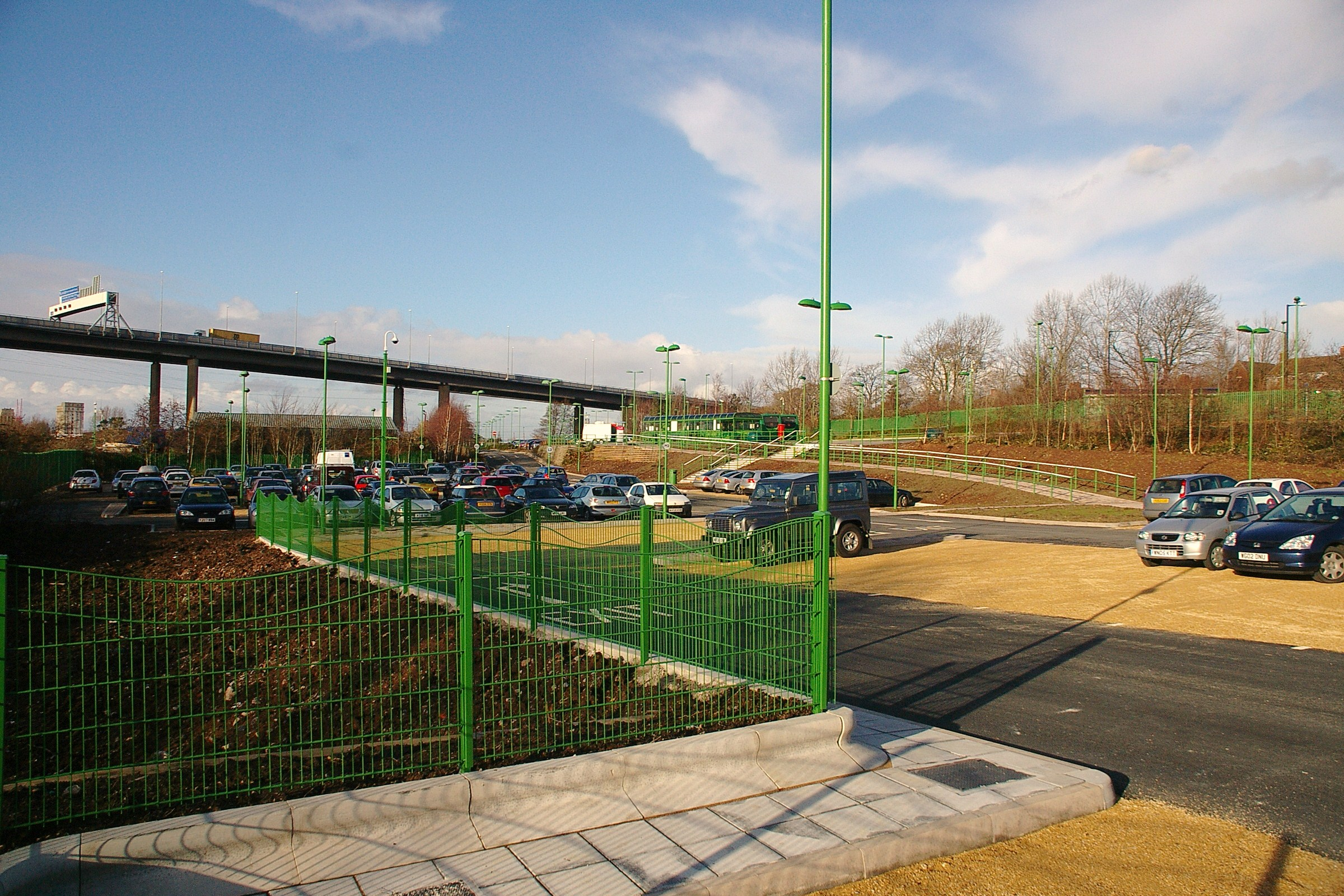

General information
- Location: Shirehampton, Bristol; England
- Coordinates: 51.4908°N 2.6891°W
- Operator: Bristol City Council
- Bus routes: 1
- Bus stands: 1
- Bus operators: Stagecoach West
- Connections: Rail

Construction
- Parking: 830 spaces
- Accessible: Ramp Access

History
- Opened: April 2002 (bus); August 2023 (rail)
Location

The Portway park and ride site is on the A4 Portway at Shirehampton, to the north-west of Bristol, England, close to junction 18 of the M5 motorway.

== History ==
The site opened in April 2002 with 300 car parking spaces as part of the Bristol park & ride network. There had been considerable opposition from local residents. The site was expanded in 2008 to provide 830 car parking spaces, to coincide with the opening of the Cabot Circus shopping mall in Broadmead.

Services were operated by First West of England until CT Plus took over in April 2012. First resumed operating the services in September 2016. In March 2023, First Bus handed the route over to Stagecoach West, who rebranded the service as route 9, which now runs beyond the city centre to Brislington Park and Ride.

== Buses ==
The site opens at 4:30 am with the first bus leaving by 6:10 am Monday to Saturday. On Sunday, the site opens at 8:30 am with the first bus leaving at 9:30 am. The last bus leaves Bristol city centre at 11:09 pm Monday to Saturday and 6:16 pm on Sunday. The site closes at midnight Monday to Saturday and 9:30 pm on Sundays. The service operates a 12-minute frequency during peak times Monday to Friday, with a 15-minute frequency throughout the day. It also runs up to every 15 minutes on Saturdays, Sundays, and bank holidays.

The site also serves Ashton Gate stadium during Bristol Rugby and Bristol City home fixtures. The AG1 service operates for both 3:00 pm and 7:45 pm fixtures of both clubs.

== Railway ==
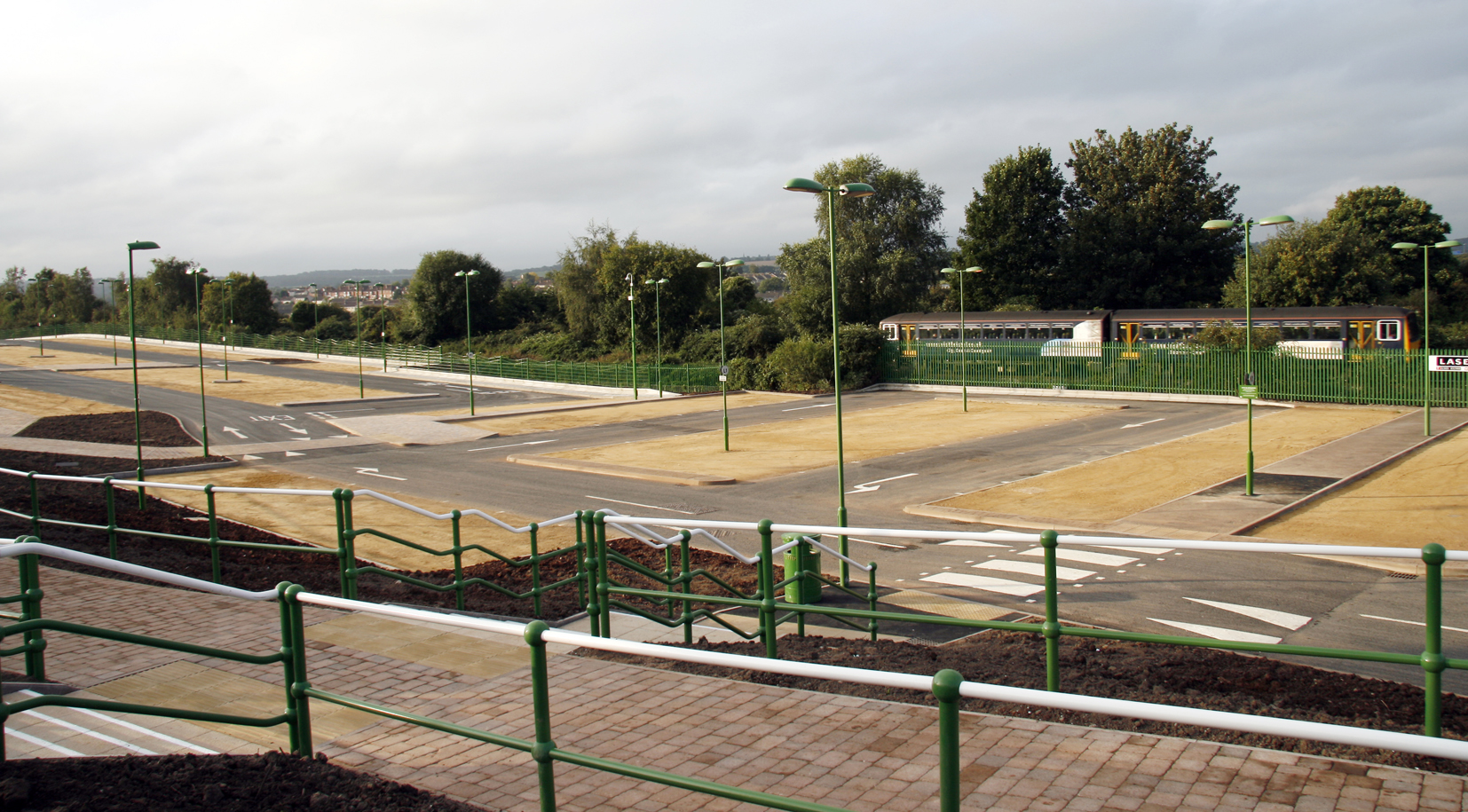
Severn Beach train in the background, passing the park and ride site

The Severn Beach railway line runs adjacent to the site. In 2009, proposals were made for a station to be built to serve the site, on land which had already been set aside. The station was allocated £2.2 million in June 2017 from the Local Growth Fund, via the West of England local enterprise partnership, and at that time completion was expected in 2019. Spending of £1.5 million was later moved to the 2021–22 year. After multiple delays, the station was opened on 1 August 2023.

== See also ==
- Buses in Bristol
