= Bristol bus station =

Bus station in Bristol, England

Bristol Bus and Coach Station
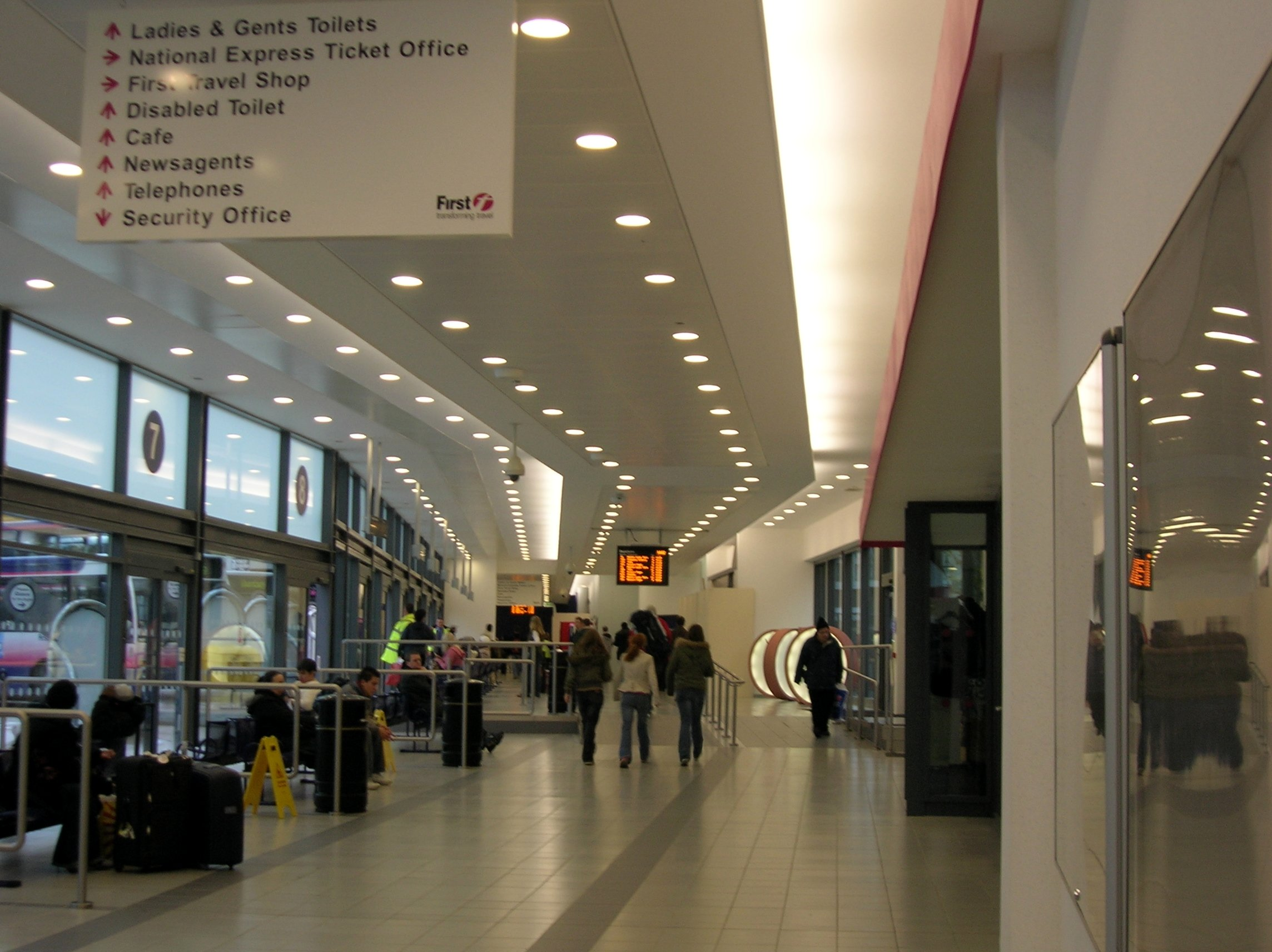

General information
- Location: Marlborough Street; City of Bristol; United Kingdom
- Coordinates: 51.4592°N 2.5932°W
- Owner: First West of England
- Operator: First West of England
- Bus routes: 39 Bristol to Bath via Keynsham 172 Bristol to Bath via Pensford & Midsomer Norton; 374 Bristol to Wells, Glastonbury, Street & Taunton; 375 Bristol to Wells, Glastonbury, Street & Bridgwater; 376 Bristol to Wells, Glastonbury, Street & Yeovil; 376a Bristol to Wells via Pensford & Midsomer Norton; 522 Bristol to Bath via Keynsham & Midsomer Norton; A1 Airport Flyer Bristol to Bristol Airport; T7 Bristol to Chepstow/Magor; X1 Bristol to Weston-super-Mare ASDA (Direct via A370; X1a Bristol to Weston-super-Mare ASDA via Long Ashton; X4 Bristol to Portishead; X6 Bristol to Clevedon via Failand; X6a Bristol to Clevedon via Long Ashton & Nailsea; X9 Bristol to Nailsea via Wraxall; X14 Bristol to Weston-super-Mare via Avonmouth, Portishead and Clevedon (Night Bus); X39 Bristol to Bath (Direct via A4) U2 Bristol to Weston-super-Mare via Langford, Sandford and Weston General Hospital
- Bus stands: 19
- Bus operators: First West of England; Newport Bus; National Express; FlixBus

Construction
- Structure type: at-grade

Other information
- Website: www.firstbus.co.uk/bristol-bath-and-west

History
- Opened: 1958 (Original Station); 2006 (Current Station)
Location

Bristol Bus and Coach Station serves the city of Bristol in the west of England. It is situated on Marlborough Street, near the Broadmead shopping area. The original bus station and onsite depot were opened in 1958 by the Bristol Omnibus Company. It was later redeveloped with the current bus station opening in 2006.

Before 1958 Bristol had no bus station; most country and long-distance coach services departed from Prince Street, and others used street stops in the Centre, Canon's Road and Old Market.

The station is managed by First West of England. There are 19 bays, Bays 1 to 7 are for National Express long-distance coach services, bay 8 is for Flixbus, bays 9 & 10 are reserved for the A1 Airport Flyer service to Bristol Airport via Bristol Temple Meads. Bays 11 to 19 are for local bus services to locations outside of Bristol.

Bristol Bus and Coach Station has many facilities including a First Bus Travelhub which offers information and ticket sales for First Bus services, a National Express Ticket Sales and Information Desk, National Express ticket machines, The Coffee Room cafe, 24-hour security and public toilets including an accessible toilet.

== See also ==
- Buses in Bristol
