= Volvo B9R =

Rear Engined Coach Chassis manufactured by Volvo

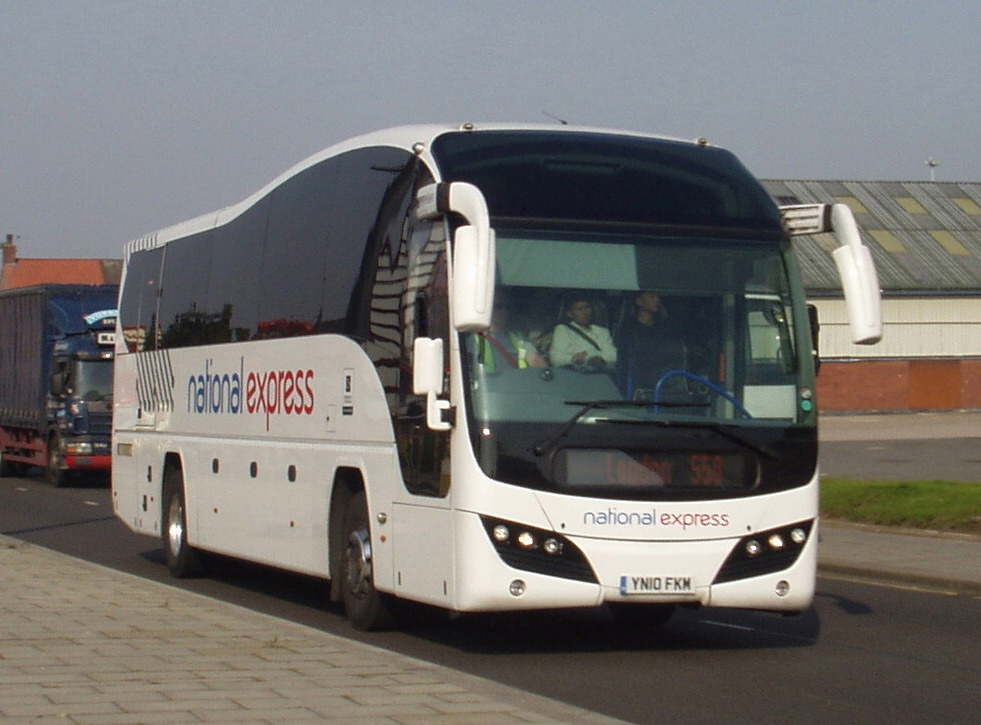
- National Express Plaxton Elite B9R

Overview
- Manufacturer: Volvo

Body and chassis
- Floor type: Step entrance

Powertrain
- Engine: Volvo D9A/D9B 9.0L rear-mounted I-6
- Transmission: 6-speed manual I-Shift automated

Dimensions
- Kerb weight: 19,000 kg (42,000 lb) maximum GVW

The Volvo B9R is a rear-engined coach chassis built by Volvo. It can be built with bodies up to 13 m (42 ft 8 in) long and a maximum gross weight of 19,000 kg (42,000 lb).

The B9R is equipped with a rear-mounted Volvo 9.0-litre 6-cylinder diesel engine under the floor, producing 380 bhp (283 kW; 385 PS) and torque of 1,700 N⋅m (1,254 lb⋅ft).

The Plaxton Panther is built on the B9R chassis and provides 53 seats. The Sunsundegui bodywork provides a 55-seat arrangement.

== See also ==
- List of buses
