= Bristol park and ride =

Bus service in Bristol, England

Bristol Park & Ride
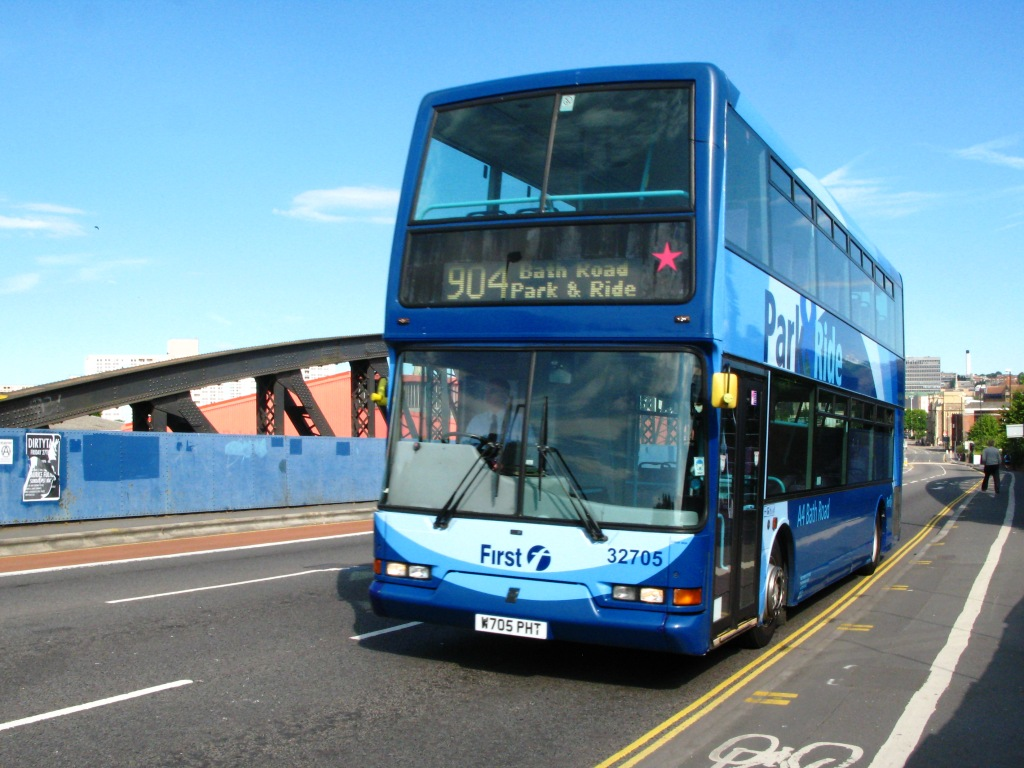
- First Bristol East Lancs bodied Dennis Trident on route 904 in June 2011
- Parent: Bristol City Council
- Locale: Bristol
- Service type: Park & ride
- Routes: 5
- Destinations: Southmead Hospital, Bristol City Centre, Bristol Temple Meads Station
- Stations: Long Ashton; Portway; Brislington; Lyde Green; Yate
- Fleet: Alexander Dennis Enviro400 MMC; Volvo B9TL/Wright Eclipse Gemini
- Operator: First West of England; Stagecoach West
- Website: Travel West

The Bristol Park & Ride is a park & ride system operated by Bristol City Council in Bristol, South West England.

== History ==
In 2006, the system was already established and was receiving increased funding from Bristol City Council.

Until 2011, the park & ride routes were operated by First Bristol and Wessex Bus. On 5 September 2011, route 904 was taken over by CT Plus using ex First London, London Central and London General Mercedes-Benz Citaro O530Gs with route 903 passing from Wessex to First.

On 2 April 2012, CT Plus took over the operation of route 902. In April 2014, route 505 was extended to Long Ashton to become a park & ride route.

In September 2014, Wessex Bus commenced operating a new service, the 901 between Portway and Clifton; this service ceased in September 2016.

In September 2018, the Long Ashton service was replaced by Metrobus route m2, operated by First.

In April 2023, the Brislington (A4) and Portway Park and Ride operations (on opposite sides of the city) were combined into one route, number 9. Operations were transferred to Stagecoach, using mainly Enviro 400 MMCs.

== Services ==
The system consists of five routes:

- 9: Portway P&R to Brislington P&R via City Centre and Temple Meads, operated by Stagecoach West
- 505: Long Ashton to Bristol Zoo and Southmead Hospital, operated by Stagecoach West
- metrobus m2: Long Ashton to central Bristol, operated by First West of England
- metrobus m3: Lyde Green to central Bristol via UWE's Frenchay campus, operated by First West of England
- Y1: Chipping Sodbury and Yate to Bristol, operated by First West of England

== Benefits ==
The council consider that this facility has reduced city centre congestion.

The m2 and m3 services operate a 'buy before you board' system through use of ticket machines at bus stops. This is designed to reduce boarding times.
