= Yutong U11DD =

Chinese battery electric double-decker bus

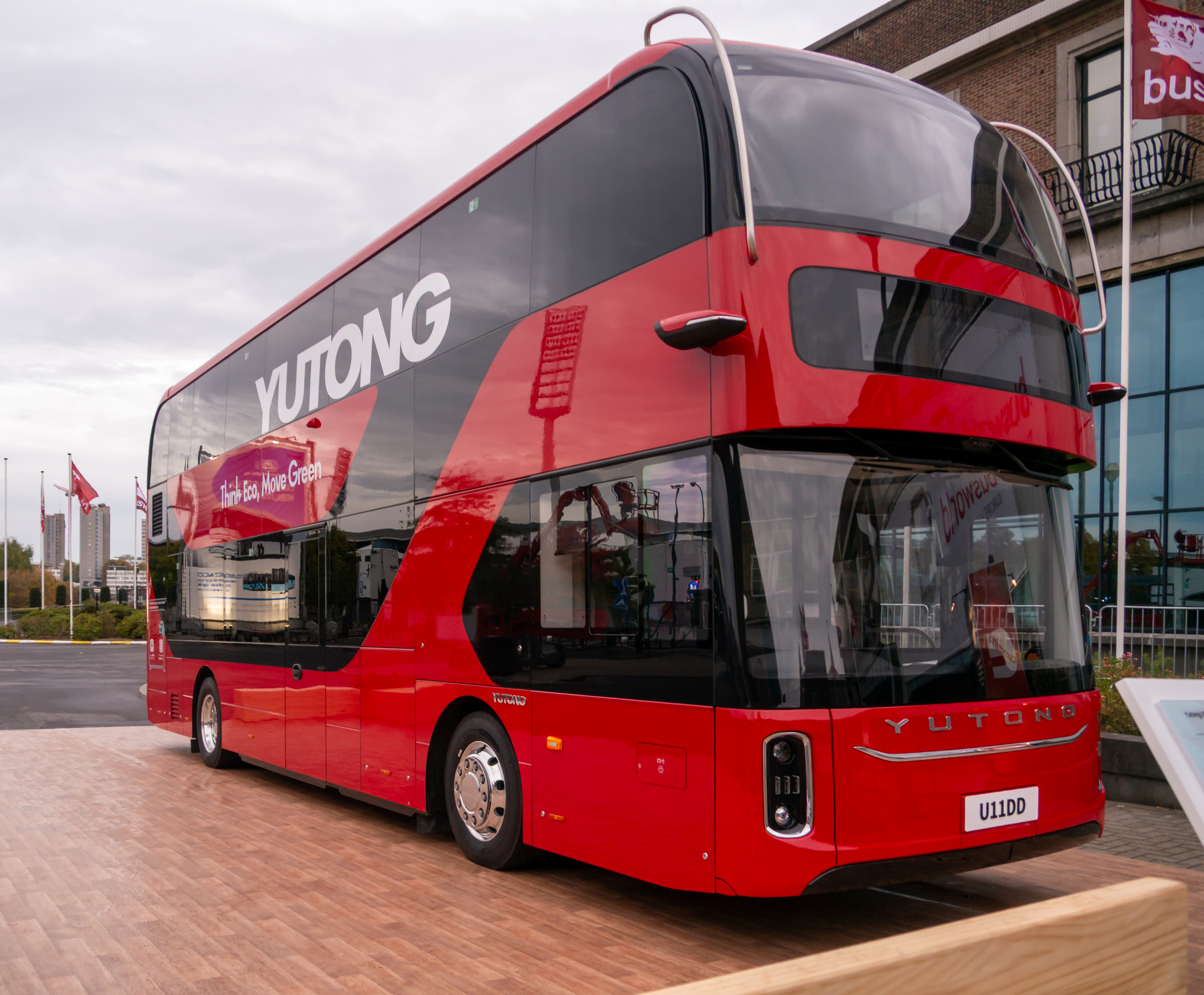
- Second-generation Yutong U11DD at the 2025 Busworld expo in Brussels

Overview
- Manufacturer: Yutong
- Production: 2023–Present
- Assembly: Zhengzhou, China

Body and chassis
- Class: Battery electric double-decker bus
- Doors: 1 or 2
- Floor type: Low floor
- Related: Yutong E10

Powertrain
- Capacity: 70 seated, 14 standing
- Power output: 220 kW PMSM electric motor
- Transmission: ZF
- Battery: 385–422 kWh lithium iron phosphate (first generation); 417–466 kWh lithium iron phosphate (second generation)
- Range: 491 kilometres (305 mi)

Dimensions
- Length: 10.9 metres (36 ft)
- Width: 2,550 millimetres (8.37 ft)
- Height: 4,350 millimetres (14.27 ft)
- Curb weight: 13,750 kilograms (13.75 t)

The Yutong U11DD is a battery electric double-decker bus manufactured by Yutong in Zhengzhou since 2023, launched initially for the United Kingdom bus market in right-hand drive configuration.

== Design ==
Announced in September 2022, the Yutong U11DD was developed extensively at Yutong's Zhengzhou manufacturing plant before the first demonstrators were shipped to the United Kingdom in June 2023. Externally, the U11DD shares design similarities with the tri-axle Yutong E12DD double-decker buses produced for Singapore's Land Transport Authority bus services in 2020, and carries a maximum of up to 84 passengers. Wheelchair and buggy spaces, as well as air conditioning, are provided as standard.

The Yutong U11DD is powered by a 220 kW permanent-magnet synchronous electric motor, and can be optioned with lithium iron phosphate batteries with a maximum charging capacity of either 385 or 442kWh. The bus shares electric driveline technology used in Yutong's other electric buses, such as the UK market's Yutong E10 and E9, allowing for a projected maximum range of up to 386 kilometres (240 mi) on a single charge.

Upgrades to the design and specification of U11DDs produced for the UK market, based on operator feedback, were announced by Yutong's UK distributor Pelican Yutong in October 2024 ahead of the 2024 Euro Bus Expo. A step in the lower deck gangway was replaced with a gently sloped floor, allowing step-free access up to the rear of the bus, with more headroom additionally created for passengers seated towards the rear. In the cab area, the cab door is held closed magnetically to reduce rattling, and electrically operated sunshields, handbrakes and steering wheel adjustment systems were added. USB chargers are specified as standard in the backs of each seat, stop bell buttons were wired to light up when pressed, and wall-mounted folding seats in the lower deck pull out gently.

A second-generation U11DD was launched by Yutong a year later at the 2025 Busworld expo in Brussels, debuting in the UK at the 2026 Euro Bus Expo in Birmingham. The second-generation U11DD featured a redesigned tapered front fascia and windscreen compliant with Transport for London's Bus Safety Standard. Both the lower and upper-decks were redesigned to feature a fully flat floor, with the redesigning and movement of rear-mounted engine and air conditioning equipment allowing for the lower deck's rear seats to be changed to a back-to-back layout. Options for either full-height or low-height variants were also made available from this generation.

== Operators ==
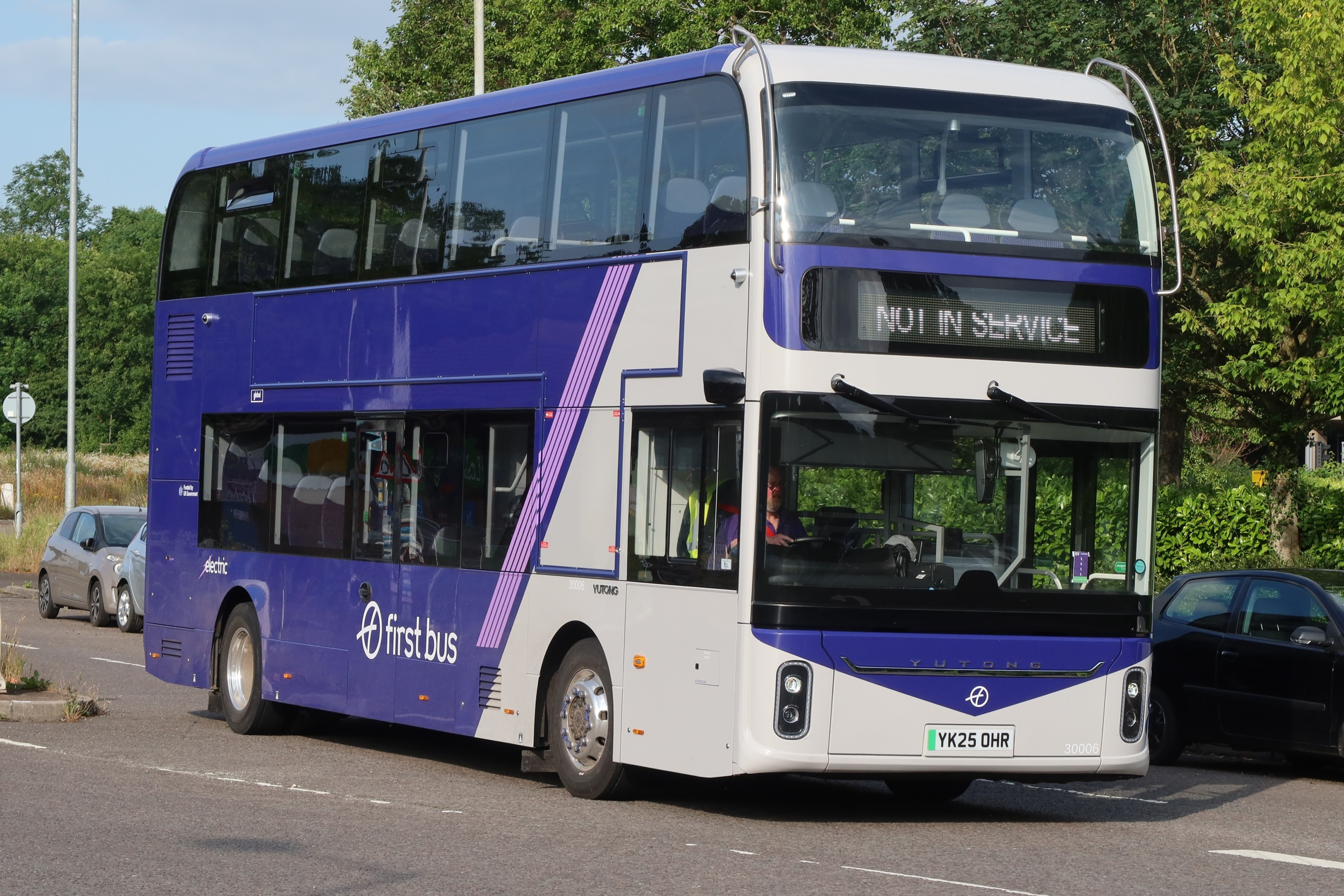
First South West first-generation Yutong U11DD in Taunton in June 2025

Two demonstrators were first shipped to the United Kingdom for evaluation by bus operators in late 2023. The first operator to take delivery of U11DDs was Welsh municipal Newport Bus, a popular operator of electric Yutongs, who took delivery of two U11DDs in April 2024.

The first major order of U11DDs was placed by the FirstGroup, aided with funding from the central government Zero Emission Bus Regional Areas (ZEBRA 2) scheme in July 2024. The first 24 WESTbus-branded U11DDs were delivered to First West of England's Weston-super-Mare depot in March 2025, with further examples from an order for 74 set to enter service from the operator's Hengrove depot in south Bristol; further U11DDs from First's order for 127 U11DDs are set to be delivered during 2025 to First Essex and The Buses of Somerset for service in Basildon and Taunton respectively.

Following the delivery of a single U11DD to Stagecoach Group subsidiary Stagecoach North East's Stockton-on-Tees depot during 2025, 22 were delivered to Stagecoach South in April 2026 for use in the Blackwater Valley and Surrey.

The McGill's Group's Xplore Dundee subsidiary took delivery of twelve U11DDs in March 2025, the first of the model to be delivered to a Scottish bus operator. Molesey independent coach operator Westway Coaches took delivery of a single U11DD, equipped with seatbelted leather seats, for private hire coaching work in September 2024, and AirSym of Heathrow took delivery of a former demonstrator on lease in early 2025 for use on tourist shuttle services to the Warner Bros. Studios in Leavesden.

Nottingham City Transport was the first operator to order the second-generation U11DD, ordering 13 full-height models for delivery during autumn 2026, with a further five set to be delivered by April 2027.
