= First West of England =

Bus operator

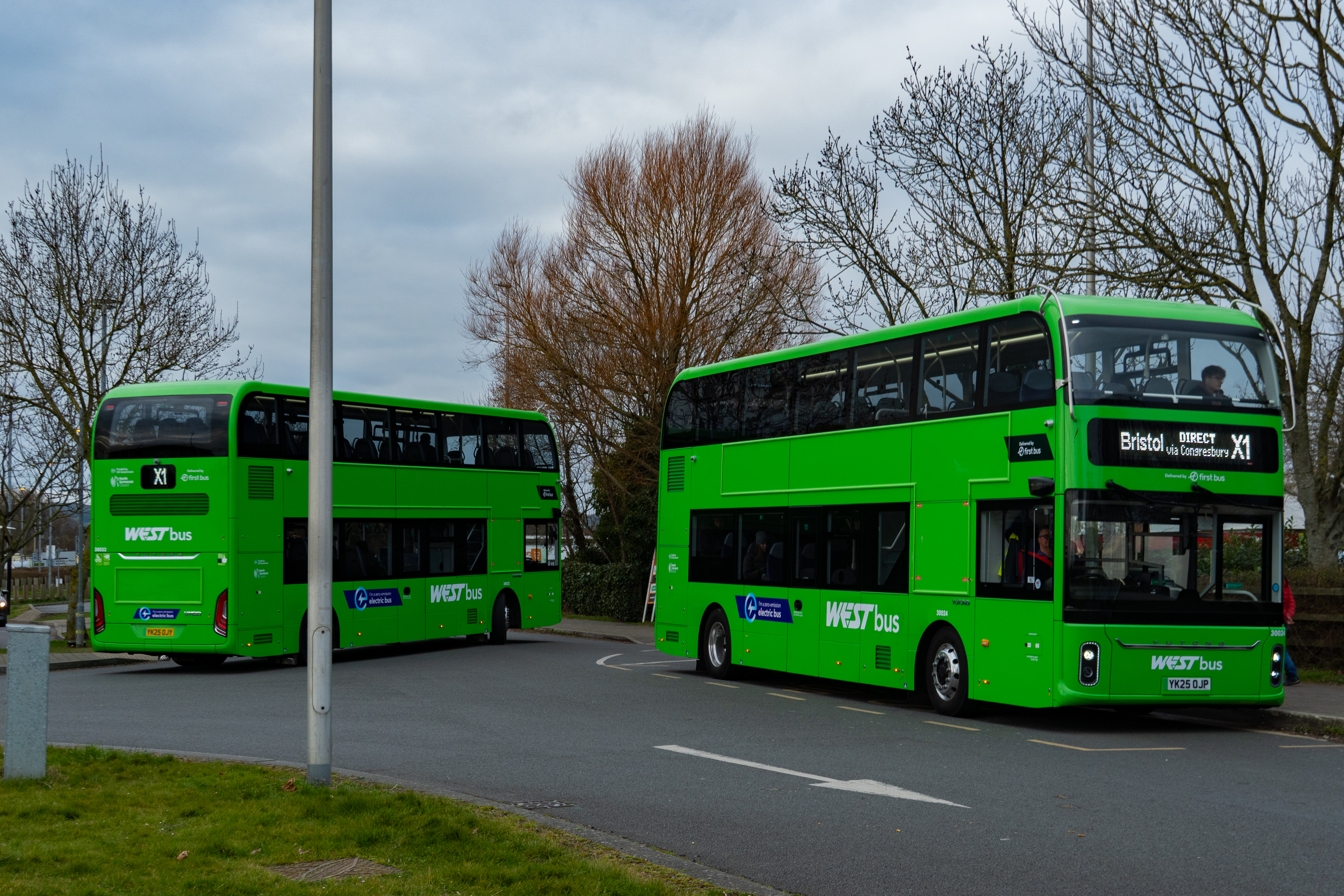
- Yutong U11DD battery electric buses at Worle Interchange, Weston-super-Mare, March 2025
- Parent: FirstGroup
- Founded: 1875
- Headquarters: Bristol
- Service area: Bristol; Bath; North Somerset; South Gloucestershire; Weston-super-Mare; Wiltshire; Worcestershire
- Service type: Bus services
- Routes: 146 (February 2024, incl. contracts)
- Depots: 7
- Fleet: 502 (June 2023)
- Annual ridership: 70 million (2018-19)
- Managing Director: Doug Claringbold
- Website: https://www.firstbus.co.uk/bristol-bath-and-west

First West of England is a bus operator providing services in Bristol, Bath, Somerset, South Gloucestershire, Worcestershire and Wiltshire. It is a subsidiary of FirstGroup.

== History ==
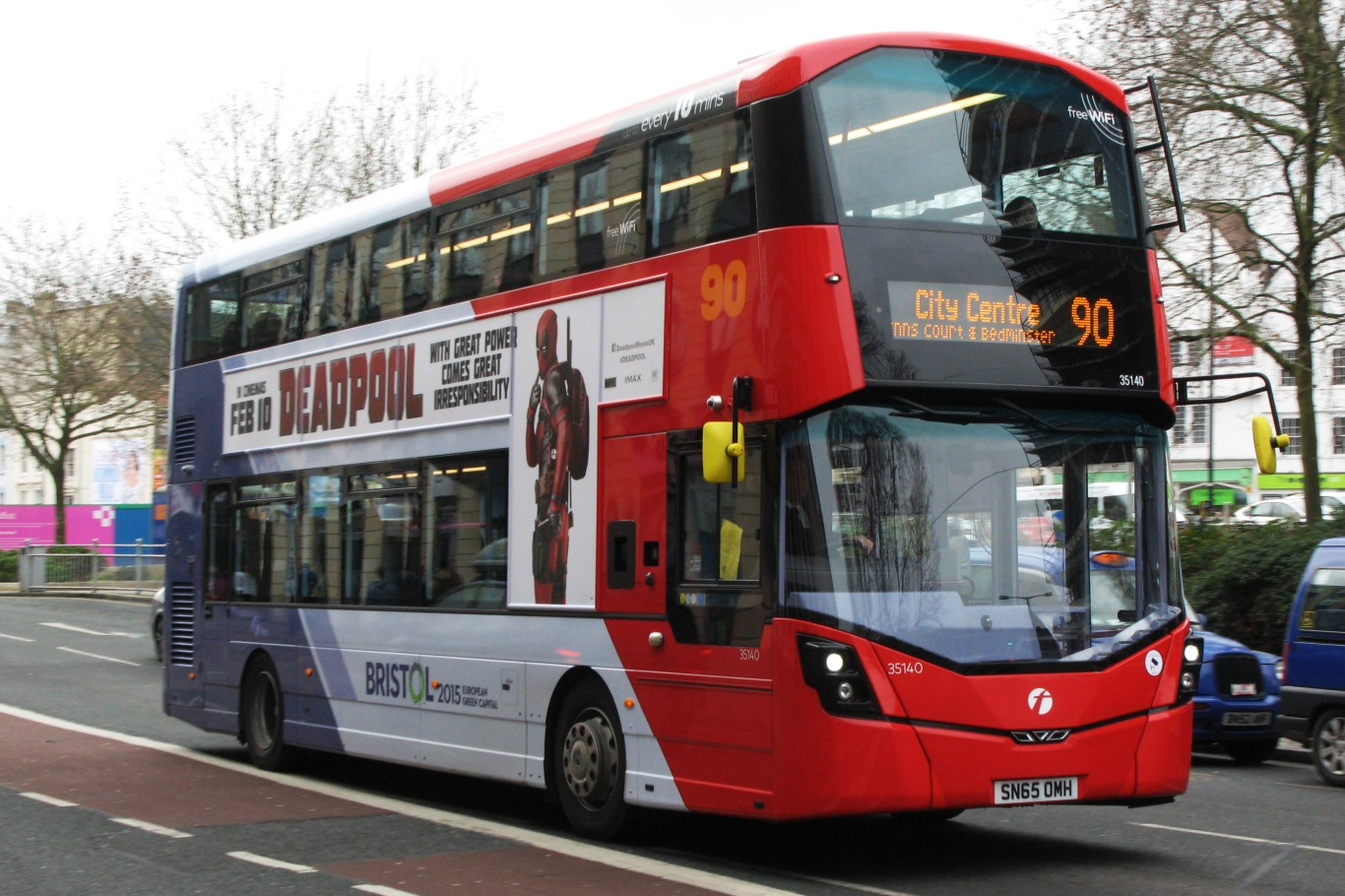
Wright StreetDeck in Bristol in January 2016

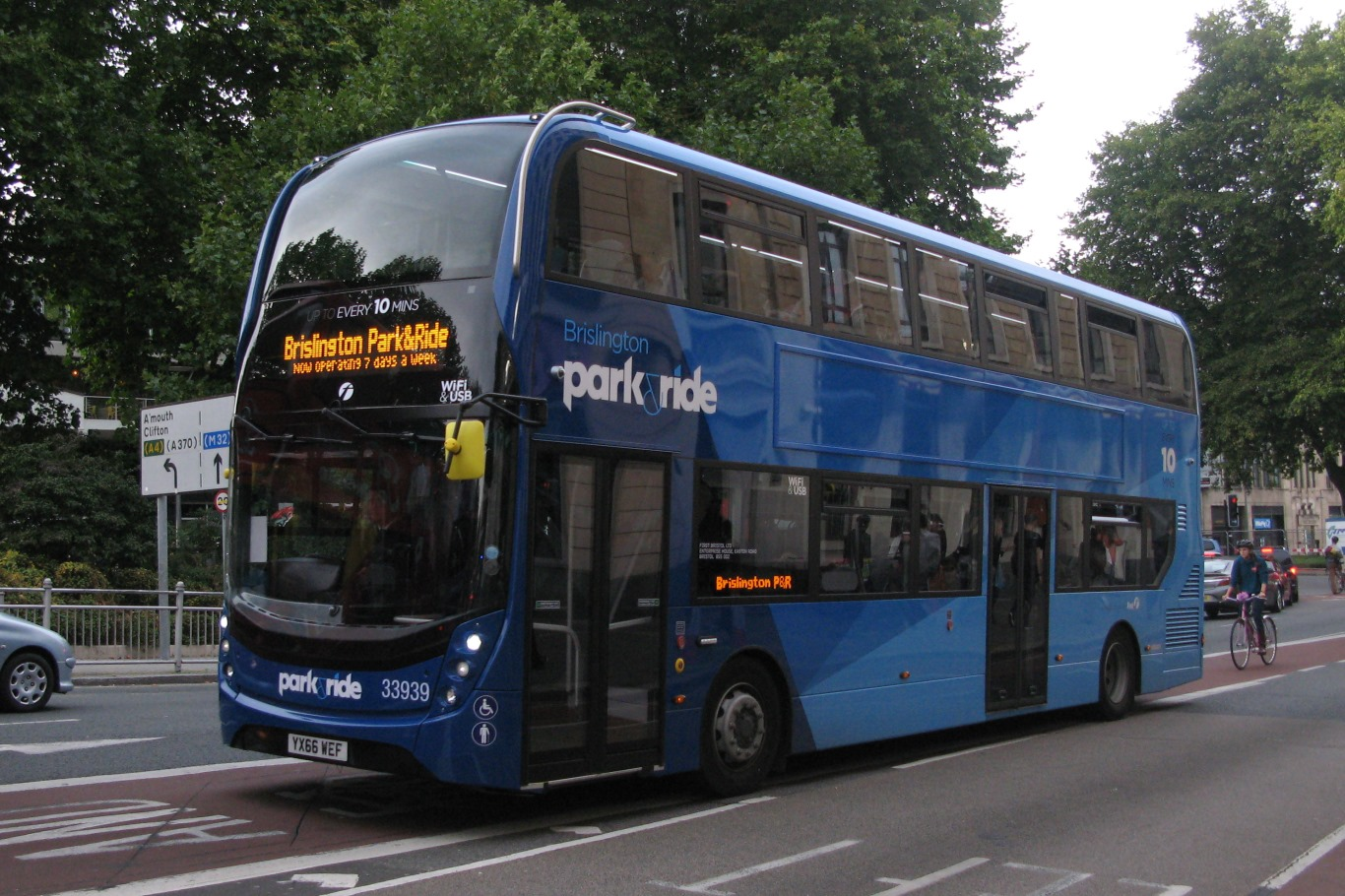
Alexander Dennis Enviro400MMC in park & ride livery in September 2016

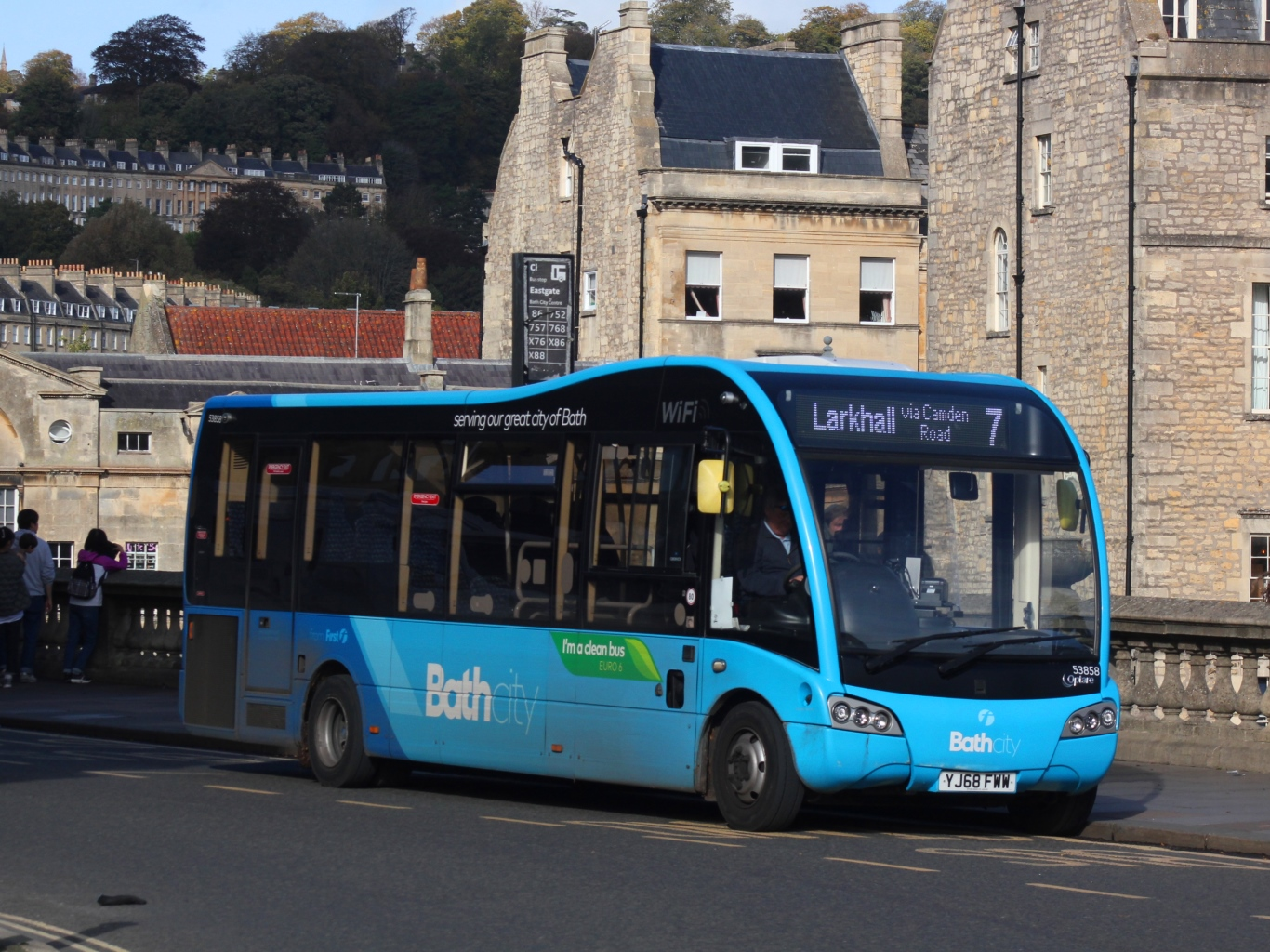
Optare Solo SR in Bath in October 2022

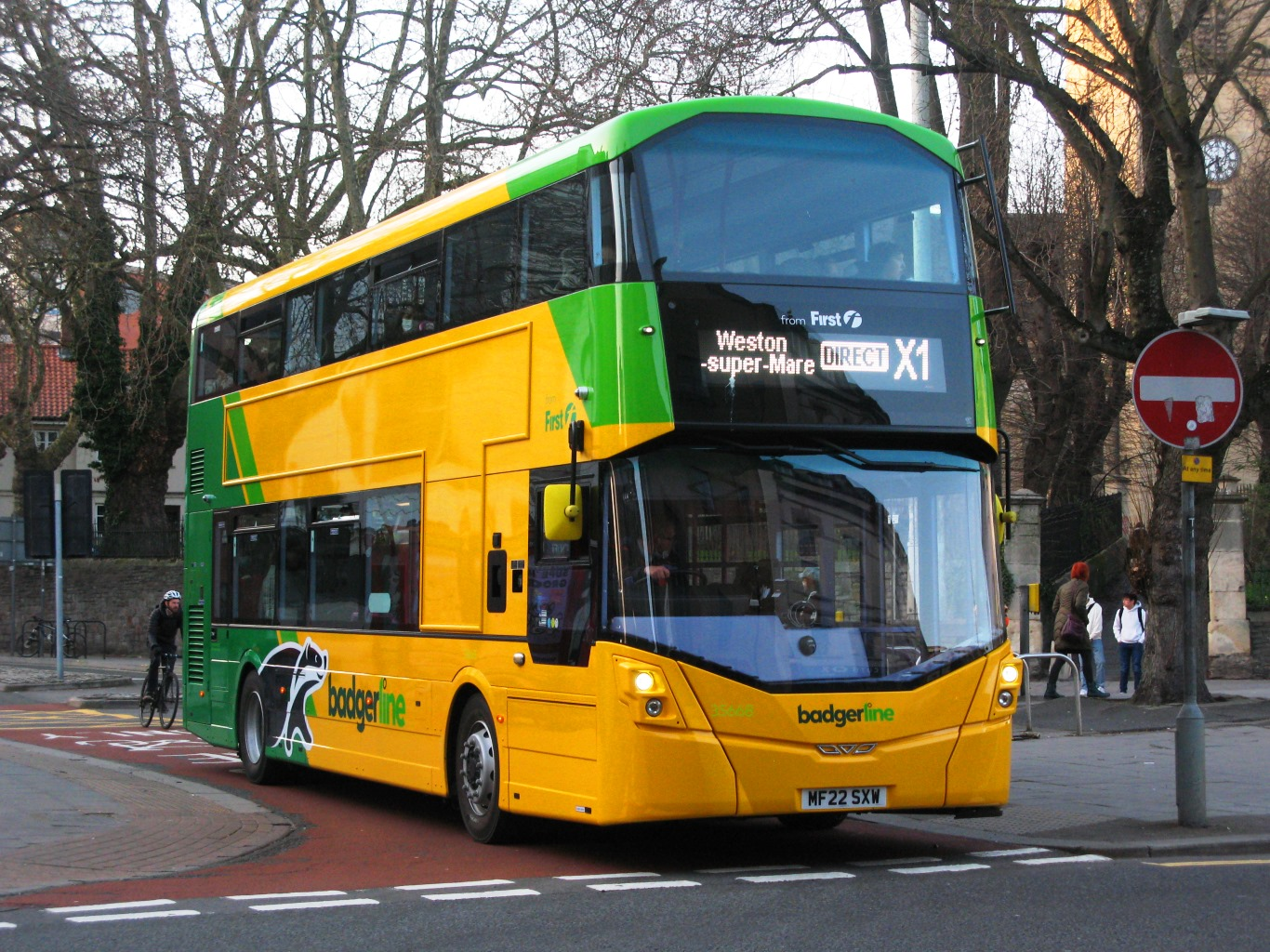
Wright StreetDeck in Weston-super-Mare's Badgerline livery in Bristol in March 2022

In 1875, George White formed the Bristol Tramways Company and began a horse-drawn service from Upper Maudlin Street to Blackboy Hill. In 1887, the Bristol Tramways Company merged with the Bristol Cab Company to form the Bristol Tramways & Carriage Company, later the Bristol Omnibus Company.

In 1929, the White family sold out to the Great Western Railway who by 1932 had sold it to the Western National. In 1948, the company was nationalised, and in 1969 it became part of the National Bus Company.

In September 1983, the National Bus Company split the operation in two, with the Cheltenham and Gloucester Omnibus Company taking the services in Cheltenham, Gloucester, Stroud and Swindon. The remainder stayed with the existing Bristol Omnibus Company, divided into two business units: Citybus for services within Bristol, and Bristol Country Bus for services in Bath, Somerset and Wiltshire.

Badgerline was formed in 1985 as the business name of the Bristol Country Bus and in 1986 its assets were transferred to a separate legal entity and privatised in September 1986 in a management buyout.

In September 1987, City Line (formerly Citybus) was sold to Midland Red West which in April 1988 was purchased by Badgerline. After Badgerline merged with GRT Group to form FirstBus in April 1995. In 1996, Badgerline was merged back into City Line, the City Line operation was rebranded as First Bristol.

Southern National was formed in 1983 as the Somerset and Dorset operations of Western National (then part of the National Bus Company). It was privatised in 1988, acquired by FirstGroup in 1999 and rebranded as First Southern National.

In 2001, FirstGroup changed the legal structure of some of its bus operating subsidiaries. The legal entity which had been Badgerline Limited was renamed First City Line Limited and became the operator of Bristol city services (now First Bristol Limited). The legal entity which had been First Bristol Buses Limited (which had previously been Bristol Omnibus Company, incorporated in 1887) was renamed First Somerset & Avon Limited in May 2003 after merging with Somerset operations of First Southern National.

In 2013, buses started to be painted into the new First Bus livery and 'West of England' branding was applied on both sides beneath the windows (on some single-decks the branding is applied above the windows towards the front of the bus). First Somerset & Avon is still printed on some tickets, while other tickets are printed with First Bristol & Avon or just First Bristol.

In February 2014, First's Bridgwater and Taunton business was transferred to First South West and rebranded as The Buses of Somerset in an unprecedented break from the FirstGroup corporate style. The business instead now sports a two-tone green and cream livery with bespoke branding, website and social media profiles.

In December 2016, all services operated by First Bristol transferred to First Somerset & Avon, which was officially renamed First West of England in June 2017, meaning Bristol city services are once again operated by the same legal company as when they first started in 1875.

In August 2018, the Weston-super-Mare based operations were rebranded as Badgerline with the yellow and green livery of the former operator adopted.

In 2022, First Worcester depot was transferred from the First Midlands management structure into the newly formed First Cymru & West of England structure, forming part of the West of England division respectively.

== Routes ==
First West of England operate the majority of services in Bristol and an extensive network of services in and around Bath, Trowbridge, Wells and Weston-super-Mare as well as Worcestershire, including the 126 which was reinstated in October 2023.

Services in Bristol include the four routes of the metrobus express network.

== Fleet ==
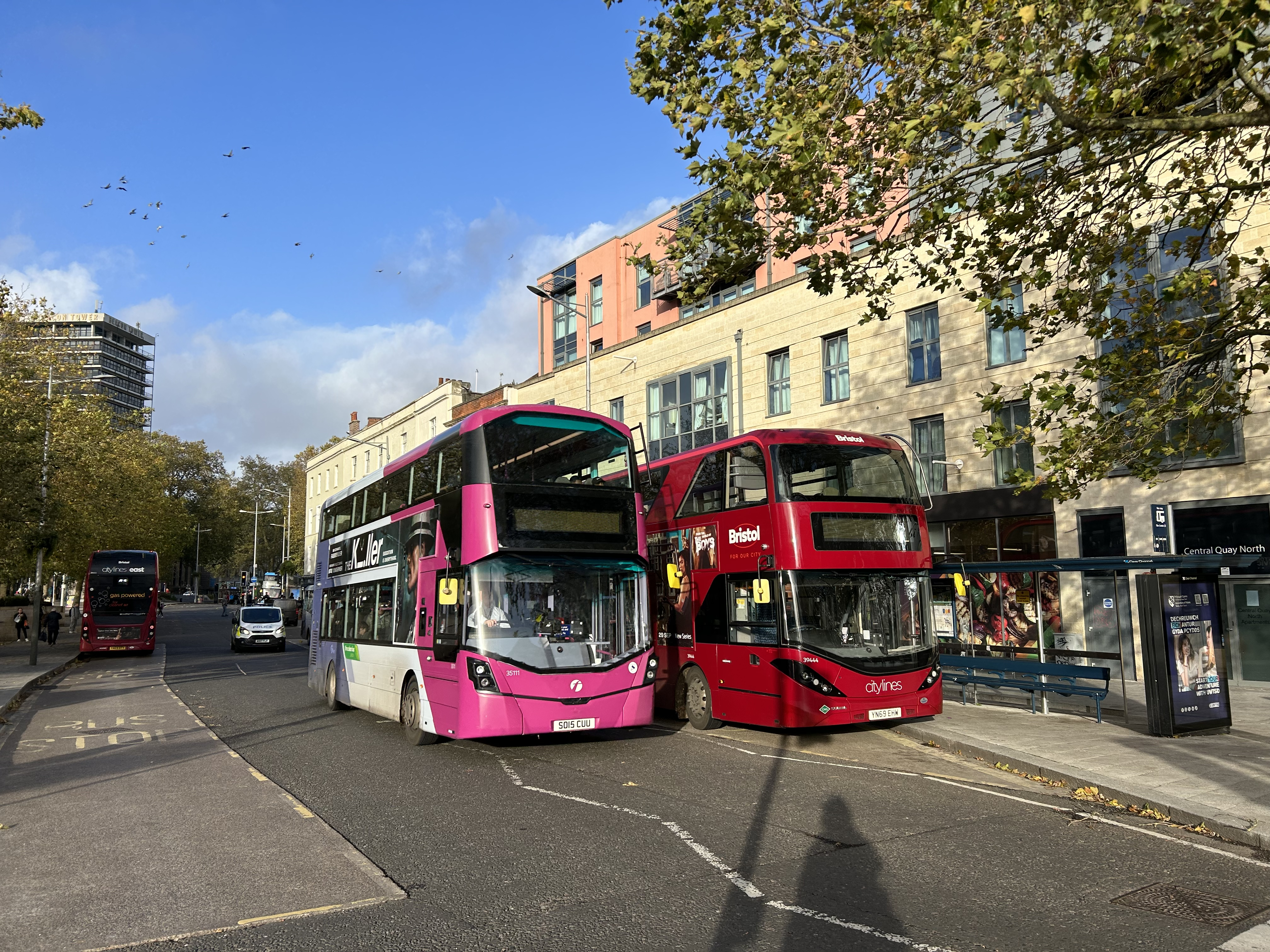
First Wright StreetDeck passing an Alexander Dennis Enviro400 City CBG in Bristol city centre, November 2023

As of January 2024, the First West of England fleet consisted of 561 buses and coaches. The fleet includes 99 Alexander Dennis Enviro400 City CBG natural gas-powered buses, which entered service in February 2020.

In 2024, 7 single and 67 double decker electric buses were ordered for the Hengrove depot and 24 double decker electric buses for the Weston-super-Mare depot, as part of a 169 First Bus order of Yutong E10, E12 and U11DD buses.

In 2025, 12 Alexander Dennis Enviro200EV double-deck and five Enviro100EV single-deck electric buses were ordered for use in Bath in 2026 through a West of England Combined Authority funding initiative.

== Depots ==
First West of England has depots at Marlborough Street in central Bristol, and in the Lawrence Hill and Hengrove suburbs. Other depots are at Keynsham, Bath, Weston-super-Mare, Wells and Worcester.

On 20 March 2025, the West of England's first electrified bus depot was unveiled at Weston-super-Mare, costing £14.9 million.

On 3 June 2025, Bristol's first battery-electric bus charging facility was opened at the Hengrove depot. funded by £37.4 million from First Bus and a £6.6 million government grant.

== See also ==
- Buses in Bristol
- First South West
- The Buses of Somerset
