= Coach transport in the United Kingdom =

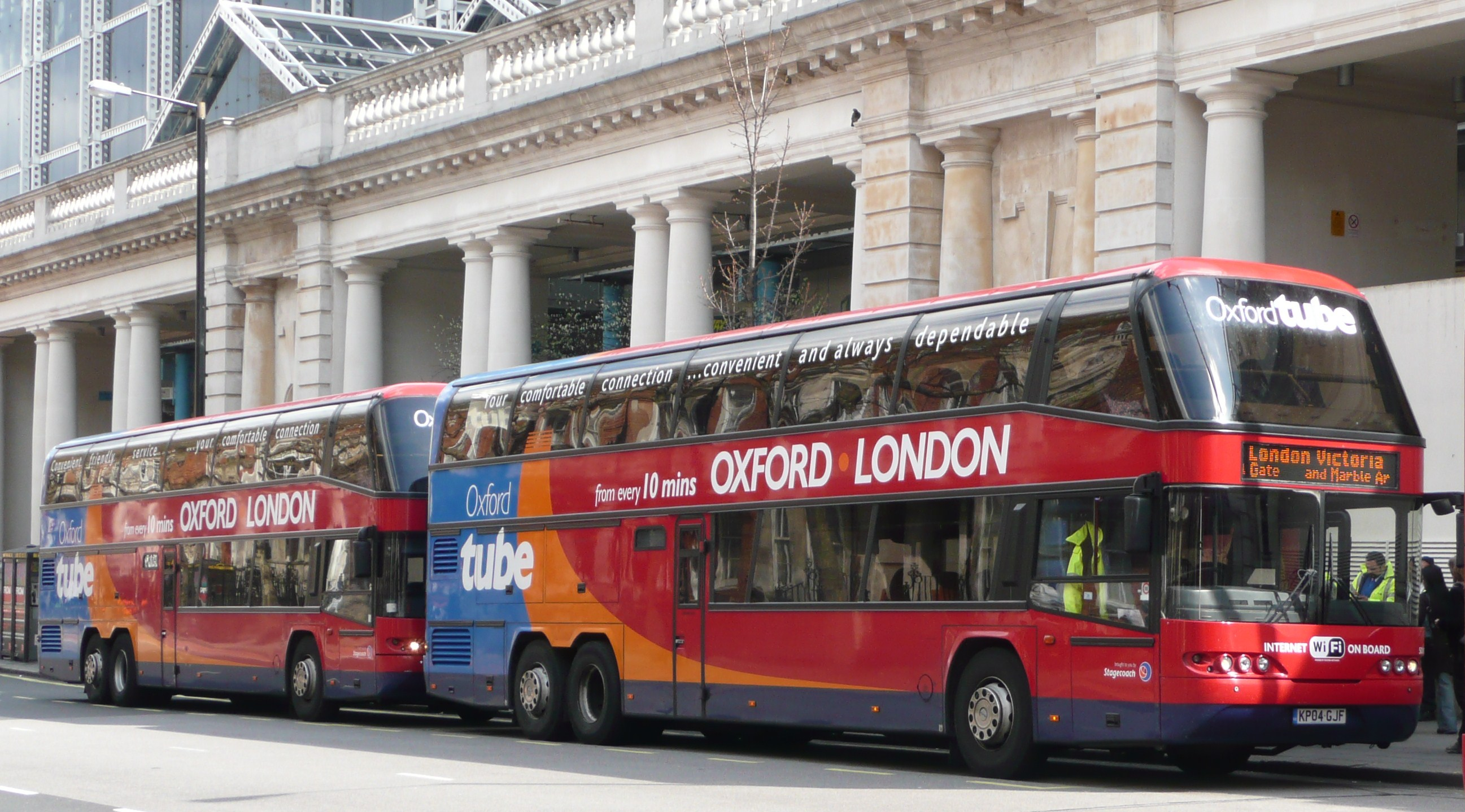
Two Oxford Tube Neoplan Skyliners at the Buckingham Palace Road terminus

The United Kingdom has a number of intercity coach services.

== Comparison with other travel modes ==
Coach services generally travel further than, and do not stop as frequently as, and cost more than, bus services. It is common, but not universal, for coach travel to require advance purchase of tickets, whereas on buses tickets are mostly bought (or, increasingly, electronic payment is made) on board. The distinction is not absolute, and some coach services, especially in Scotland, operate as local bus services over sections of route where there is no other bus service.

Coach usage in the United Kingdom is a small fraction of that of rail, which has increased since privatisation in the mid-1990s.

== History ==
=== Origins ===
Long-distance horse-drawn stagecoach services were effectively replaced by the arrival of the railways in the 1830s and 1840s, but stagecoaches and charabancs were still used for short journeys and excursions until the early years of the 20th century.

The first motor coaches were acquired by operators of those horse-drawn vehicles: for example, W. C. Standerwick of Blackpool acquired their first motor charabanc in 1911 and Royal Blue of Bournemouth acquired their first motor charabanc in 1913. Motor coaches were initially used only for excursions. In 1919 Royal Blue took advantage of a rail strike to run a coach service from Bournemouth to London. The service was so successful that it expanded rapidly. In 1920 the Minister of Transport Eric Campbell Geddes was quoted in Punch magazine as saying, "I think it would be a calamity if we did anything to prevent the economic use of charabancs" and expressed concern in Parliament at the problems caused to small charabanc and omnibus operators.

=== Early history ===
The first scheduled motorcoach service to carry passengers from both ends and to and from intermediate points was the Greyhound Motors service between London and Bristol, started on 11 February 1925.

The coach industry expanded rapidly in the 1920s, a period of intense competition. Several bus companies, including Midland Red, Crosville and Red & White, started coach services. By 1930, no fewer than 18 companies were running coaches between Oxford and London. For example, the original Royal Blue service from Bournemouth to London grew from twice a week during 1920 to twice daily during 1921.

The Road Traffic Act 1930 introduced a national system of regulation of passenger road transport and authorised local authorities to operate transport services. It also imposed a speed limit of 30 mph for coaches whilst removing any speed limit for private cars. The act caused considerable disruption and it received criticism - In 1931 the commissioner refused to sanction coaches operating into central London. Frank Pick, managing director of Underground Electric Railways Company of London commented on this at the time saying

The Road Traffic Act of 1930 was passed to restore order and prevent abuse on the roads. No one envisaged its use to deprive the public of reasonable service. It outruns its object. Control is one thing; prohibition is another.

Following the 1930 act coach operators bought, or reached agreement with competitors to share services and pool revenues. Many of the independent companies were bought by the two major bus groups, the Tilling Group and British Electric Traction. In 1932, a group of coach operators opened Victoria Coach Station in London, which became the London terminus for most coach services. In 1934, six coach operators (Black & White, Bristol Greyhound, Midland Red, Red & White, and Royal Blue & United Counties) formed the Associated Motorways consortium, to provide a nationwide network of coach services that centred on Cheltenham Coach Station.

Coach operators were required to suspend services from 1942 (during World War II) to conserve fuel. Services recommenced again in 1946.

=== The post-war years ===
After the Transport Act 1947 the Labour government acquired the Tilling Group and Red & White bus companies, and Scottish Motor Traction, so that a large part of the coaching industry fell under state control. The 1950s and early 1960s were prosperous times for the industry, before foreign holidays became commonplace and car ownership spread. The Beeching cuts of the rail network in the early 1960s generated more traffic for coach operators. The speed limit for buses and coaches on 'open roads' was increased from 30 mph to 40 mph in 1961.

In 1951, Northern Roadways were given permission to operate overnight services from London to Edinburgh and Glasgow. Despite objections from British Railways and Scottish Omnibuses, services commenced in May 1952.

In March 1960, Midland Red became the first operator to operate a motorway service when it commenced a three times daily service from Birmingham to London.

The Transport Act 1968 nationalised remaining privately owned bus and coach services. It created five PTEs Passenger transport executives and the National Bus Company (from January 1969) which merged the state-owned Transport Holdings with the private British Electric Traction, at which point most of the industry became state-owned. Only a few independents, such as Yelloway and some smaller operators, remained.

In 1972, the National Bus Company formed the brand 'National Travel' (soon to be re-branded as National Express) to run long-distance coach services. Most of the coach operations of NBC's subsidiaries in England and Wales were franchised to National Express - the individual bus companies mostly continued to own the coaches, but were required to adopt the National Express brand white livery. In Scotland, and between England and Scotland, coach services continued to be operated by subsidiaries of the state-owned Scottish Bus Group.

=== Privatisation and competition ===
A National Express coach

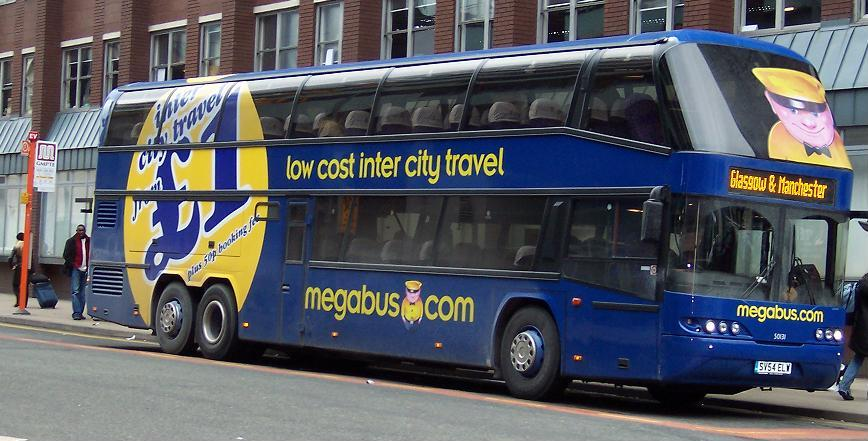
A Megabus double-decker

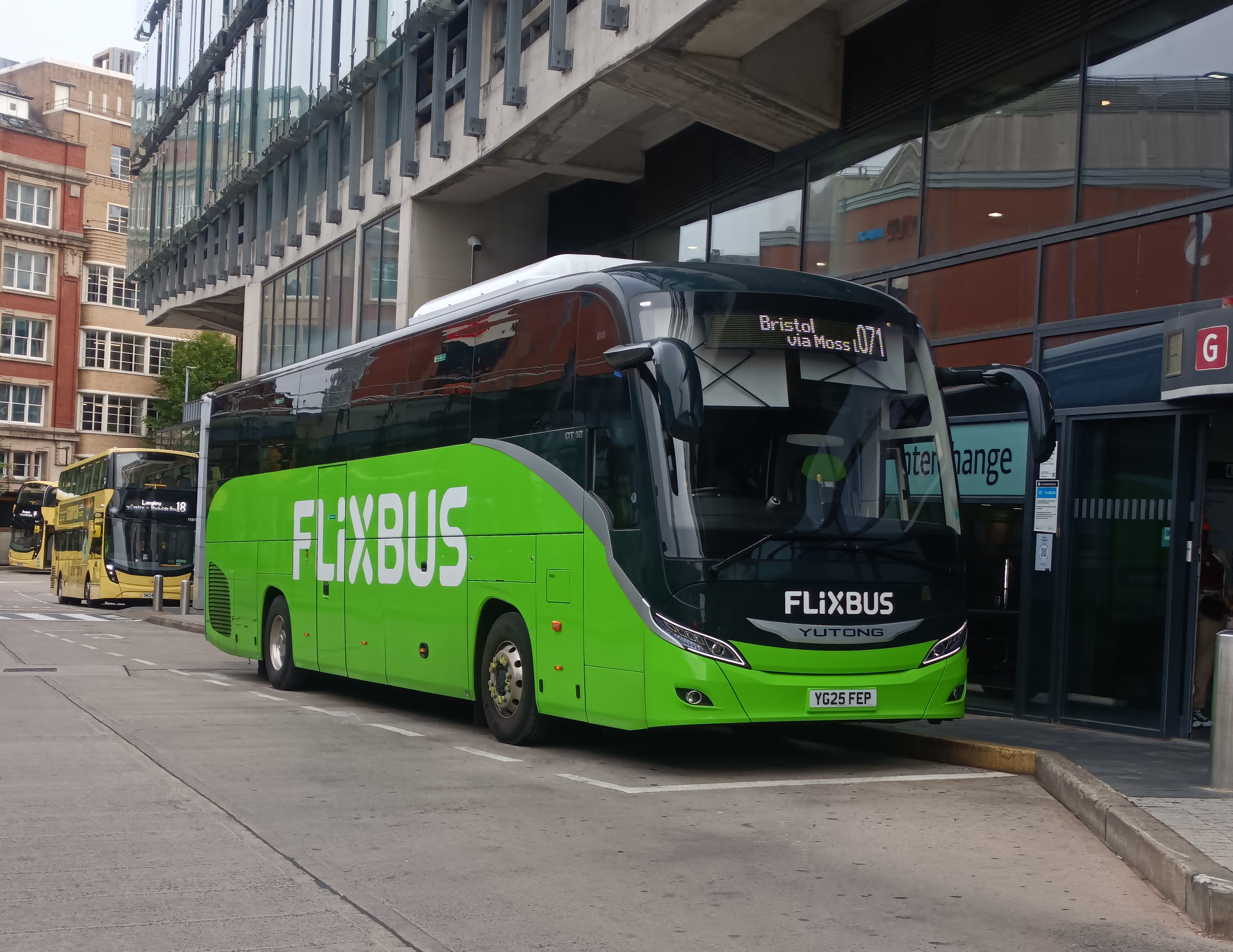
A FlixBus coach

Express coach services were deregulated by the Transport Act 1980 under the Thatcher government five years before the deregulation of local bus services by the Transport Act 1985. This led to a flurry of new coach operators. The largest of these was British Coachways, a consortium of established independents formed in 1980 to compete against National Express on six routes. It was disbanded in 1982. Other operators survived longer, but could not shake the dominance of National Express. An exception was the Oxford to London coach route, where Stagecoach Oxfordshire and the Oxford Bus Company continue to compete fiercely. (In October 2019 the Oxford Bus Company announced that it was ceasing operation of the X90 Oxford - London service after 4 January 2020. The company cited substantial falls in ridership occasioned by enhanced competition from the railways, with a new frequent service to London Marylebone, and ever-increasing road congestion especially in London. Usage had fallen by 35% between 2015 and 2019, the decline appeared to be continuing thus rendering the service unviable).

National Express was sold to its management in 1988, and floated on the London Stock Exchange in 1992. In 1985, Scottish Citylink was formed to run coach services to and within Scotland - as a franchise operation, like National Express. It too was sold to its management in 1990, but in 1993 it was sold to National Express. In 1997, the Competition Commission ordered National Express to sell Scottish Citylink, following the award of the ScotRail franchise to National Express. In 1998 Scottish Citylink was sold to ComfortDelGro.

The first Coachway interchange (Milton Keynes Coachway) was opened in the late 1970s/early 1980s. Coachways are coach interchanges built close to motorway/trunk road junctions that link to local transport, as distinct from interchanges in the middle of towns.

Speed limiters were introduced in coaches in 1988. These were initially set at 70 mph, but reduced to 65 mph in 1994. In 1993 ten people died in a coach crash on the M2 motorway, provoking calls to make it compulsory to wear a seat belt. (In 2006 a regulation was passed to require all passengers over the age of 3 years to wear a seat belt if one is available. Previous legislation had required the provision of seat belts in all new coaches.)

In 2003, Stagecoach started its Megabus operation in England and Scotland. This brought back national competition, and fares started to fall.

In Scotland, competition between Megabus and Scottish Citylink drove Stagecoach to a joint venture with ComfortDelGro in 2005 to operate both companies' coach services. The Competition Commission ruled in 2006 that the joint venture reduced competition, and in February 2008 Stagecoach announced the sale of some services, operating under the Saltire Cross brand, to Park's Motor Group.

Receipts for long-distance coach travel in 1996/1997 were £1.4 billion (2008 prices) rising to nearly £1.8 billion in 2004/2005 (also 2008 prices). Since 2005 statistics are no longer collected for UK non-local bus services. Unlike the UK rail market, which has seen massive growth since 1996, long-distance coach travel has continued to decline (from a low base). Vehicles travelled 1.6 billion km in 1996/1997, falling slightly to 1.5 billion km in 2007/2008.

From 1 January 2008 express coaches were banned from using the third lane of motorways by Section 4 of The Motorways Traffic (England and Wales) (Amendment) Regulations 2004. In 2008 National Express announced that passenger numbers had grown by 2% in the previous year.

In 2009 FirstGroup entered the market with Greyhound UK, competing with National Express and Megabus. The Birmingham Coach Station opened after a major rebuild. Reconstruction of the Milton Keynes Coachway started (opening Spring 2010).

In September 2010 FirstGroup announced it would be expanding the Greyhound UK service significantly.

In October 2010, Philip Hammond, the transport minister, announced that the M4 bus lane would be scrapped, saying: "Nothing is more symbolic of Labour's war on the motorist". The Confederation of Passenger Transport said that the decision, which was supported by all the main motoring organisations, had "come out of the blue" and that "high occupancy vehicle lanes for buses and coaches can be key tools in persuading people out of their cars and onto public transport."

The organisers of the 2012 Summer Olympics aimed to get 100% of people to the venues by public transport or other non-car modes (cycling/walking) with around 10 per cent of spectators arriving by bus and coach. In January 2010 the South East England regional transport board criticised the current proposals for not providing plans for a credible long term coach network: "The ODA has been working on an extensive network of coach services... [but] the lack of reference to this work [in the plan] is both intriguing and at the same time concerning."

The last Greyhound service ceased in December 2015.

== Limitations ==
Bus and coach usage in the United Kingdom has suffered a serious decline, especially for long-distance travel. Due to road congestion and the country's geography and infrastructure, coaches cannot compete with rail travel in terms of speed. Between London and Manchester, for example, the (hourly) National Express Coach service takes a minimum of 4 hours and 35 minutes, with most services taking 5 hours 20 minutes; the three-per-hour train service takes just two hours and seven minutes (average). Thus a day trip for leisure or business by coach would either give a very short time at the destination, or require a very early start or late return; many regard it as too arduous. Coach travel is still generally cheaper than rail, but cheap advance rail tickets have narrowed the gap; for example as of 2012 both National Express Coaches and Virgin Trains offered a single off-peak ticket for around £25 between London and Manchester. Further, many major cities (for example Norwich) only have (at best) a two hourly coach service to London, whilst rail may operate a half-hourly (or better) service, in half the time. Furthermore, many coach stops (and bus stations) have few facilities (such as parking, retail outlets, information centres) compared with the railway network's infrastructure. Finally, many politicians and governments of all parties have in recent years been champions of the developing rail network. For example, the Conservative–Liberal Democrat coalition government formed in May 2010 stated in its initial programme for government its commitment to creating a high-speed rail network.

== Coach operators ==
The main coach operators today are:

Major Operators

- National Express, largest operator in England and Wales, owned by Mobico Group
- Flixbus, operates no-frills service
- Scottish Citylink, owned by ComfortDelGro and Stagecoach Group
- TrawsCymru, 'express' bus service for Wales, run in conjunction with local franchises
- Ulsterbus, state-owned company that runs coach services in Northern Ireland

Other Operators

- Oxford Tube, owned by Stagecoach West
- Park's of Hamilton, who operate some routes in Scotland
- Ember, who operate some routes in Scotland using electric coaches
- EasyBus, operating from London to London airports
- RailAir, linking airports to railway stations
- Berrys Coaches, linking Devon and Somerset to London under the "Superfast" Brand.

London commuter

- Green Line, owned by Arriva
- The Kings Ferry and Clarke's of London, owned by Mobico Group
- Smaller independent operators such as Brookline Coaches, Centaur, Marshalls, and Redwing Coaches.

International

- RegioJet, to Prague via Brussels and Bruges
- Flixbus operates no-frills service from London to Paris and Brussels
- BlaBlaBus, a Bus by French SNCF, that operates to Lille, Paris, Bruxeles and Amsterdam.

The number of International Coaches available has decreased due to the fall in passenger numbers using coaches in the UK. Flixbus, National Express and Scottish Citylink are mostly franchise operations. Coaches are contracted in from many operating companies.

In addition there are numerous operators of coach excursions and tours, and coaches for charter.

== Major coach interchanges ==
There are a number of major coach interchanges in the UK, some of which are listed here:-

- Birmingham Coach Station
- Bournemouth Travel Interchange
- Heathrow Central bus station
- Leeds City bus station
- Manchester Chorlton Street coach station
- Milton Keynes Coachway
- Reading Coachway
- Victoria Coach Station London
