= High Wycombe Coachway =

The High Wycombe Coachway is a coachway interchange close to junction 4 of the M40 motorway to the west of High Wycombe opened on 16 January 2016. Prior to its establishment, some 150 coaches on the Oxford to London coach route passed High Wycombe each day without stopping because it would cause too much delay for other passengers were they to go via the town centre. The concept is based on the very successful Milton Keynes Coachway next to Junction 14 of the M1 and other coachway interchanges.

== Coach services ==
- LGW: Gloucester Green to Gatwick Airport via Heathrow Terminal 5 & Heathrow Central bus station, operated by Oxford Bus Company
- LHR: Oxford City Centre to Heathrow Central bus station via Heathrow Terminal 5, operated by Oxford Bus Company
- OXF: Heathrow Central bus station to Gloucester Green, operated by Oxford Bus Company

== Local bus routes ==
- 8: railway station and bus station
- 34: Abbey Barn Park, railway station and bus station
