= St Philip's Church, Buckingham Palace Road =

Church building

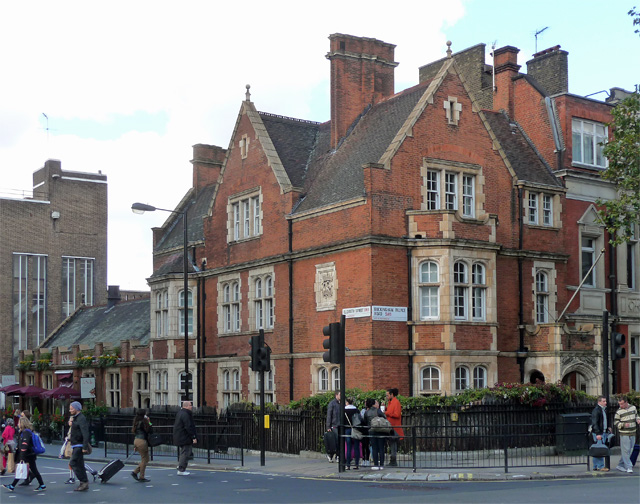
The parish's former parish hall (left) and parsonage (right).

St Philip's Church was a church building at 188 Buckingham Palace Road in Victoria, London.

== History ==
It was designed in a redbrick neo-Gothic version of the Early English style by Brierly and Demaine with enough seats for 850 and (to avoid excluding working-class worshippers) no pew rents. It was built between 1887 and 1890 and was assigned a District Chapelry by an Order in Council of 12 January 1891. The church's parish hall and parsonage (designed in 1892 by Robert William Edis) survive at the corner of Buckingham Palace Road and Elizabeth Street. A merger back into the parish of St Michael's Church, Chester Square was proposed in September 1919.

The church building of St Philip's was leased to the Russian Orthodox Church's London parish from 1921 onwards, though the parish still had an Anglican vicar as of 1938-1939 when the post's holder W. H. Elliott successfully petitioned Arthur Winnington-Ingram, Bishop of London for money to repair damage to airflow and light-flow caused by the construction of the new Imperial Airways building nearby. The church was seriously but reparably damaged during the Blitz and the Russian congregation moved out in 1956 when the building was demolished for an extension of Victoria Coach Station.
