= Gloucester Green =

Square in Oxford, England

Oxford Gloucester Green bus station
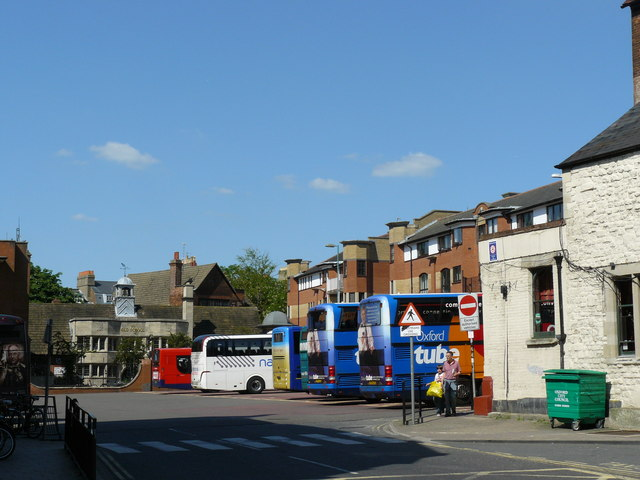

General information
- Location: Gloucester Green, Oxford; Oxford
- Coordinates: 51.7541°N 1.2622°W
- Bus stands: 13
- Bus operators: National Express; Oxford Bus Company; Stagecoach East; Stagecoach Oxfordshire; Stagecoach West
- Connections: Oxford railway station (500 metres)

History
- Opened: 1935; Rebuilt and reopened 26 October 1989
Location
- Location within Oxford city centre

Gloucester Green is a square in central Oxford, England, and the site of the city's bus station. It lies between George Street to the south and Beaumont Street to the north. To the west is Worcester Street and to the east is Gloucester Street.

The green was once an open space outside Gloucester College (now Worcester College), after which it was named. From 1783 to 1915 a fair was held on the green, and from 1835 to 1932 it was the site of the city's cattle market. In 1935, after the cattle market had been moved, the western half of Gloucester Green became the site of the city's bus station, and the eastern half became a car park. In 1987, a major redevelopment of the area began. The eastern half became a square, surrounded by shops, restaurants and residential accommodation. A new, smaller, bus station was built on the site of the old bus station, and an office block was built between the bus station and Worcester Street. An underground car park was also provided.

Today, the Gloucester Green bus station is the Oxford terminus for long-distance coach services, including services to London, coaches to Heathrow, Gatwick, Luton and Stansted airports, and route X5 to Cambridge. The bus station is too small to accommodate more than a few local bus services.

A food market is held in the square every Wednesday to Saturday and an antiques market every Thursday.

Gloucester Green is surrounded by Oxford theatres: close by are the Oxford Playhouse and Burton Taylor Studio theatres on Beaumont Street and Gloucester Street, respectively, and the Old Fire Station Theatre and the New Theatre, both on George Street.

== Gallery ==
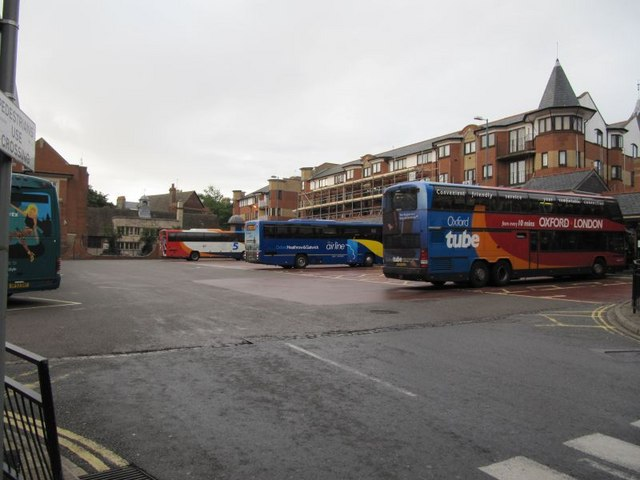
View from the entrance of Gloucester Green coach station.

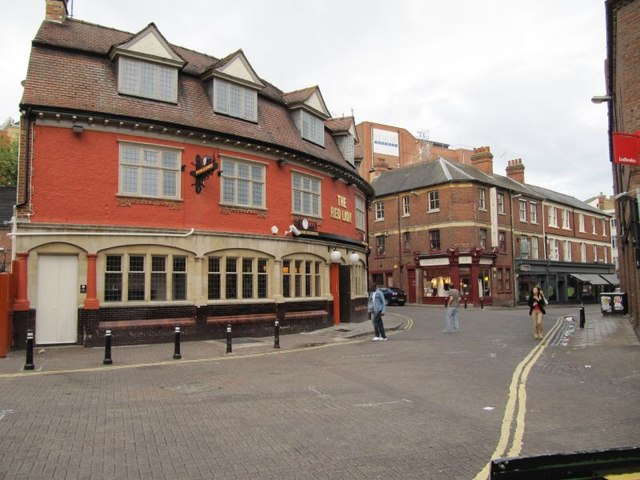
The Red Lion public house, Gloucester Green.

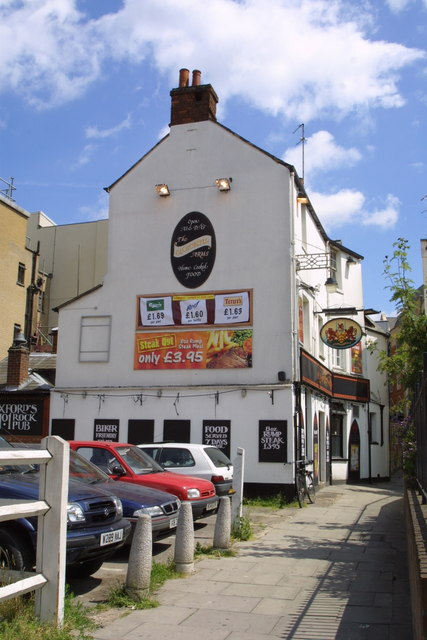
The Gloucester Arms public house, close to the Burton Taylor Studio.
