= Coachway interchange =

A coachway interchange (also transitway station, busway station) is a stopping place for express coach services near the trunk road/motorway road network. It relies on available local transport modes to complete individual journeys. Coachway interchanges help to achieve low overall journey times by avoiding operation through congested urban centres.

== History ==
=== United Kingdom ===
The Milton Keynes Coachway was the first to be called a coachway and has been in operation since 1989.

Alan Storkey, a transport economist, proposed a motorway based coach system based on Coachway interchanges to the House of Commons Transport Select Committee in May 2006 and was promoted by George Monbiot in 2006.

The South East England regional assembly gave support to the High Wycombe Coachway in December 2009.

In January 2010, the South East England regional transport board criticised the plans published by the development authority for the 2012 Summer Olympics for not providing plans of a credible long term coach network saying 'The ODA has been working on an extensive network of coach services... [but] the lack of reference to this work [in the plan] is both intriguing and at the same time concerning.'

== Coachway stations in service ==
=== United Kingdom ===
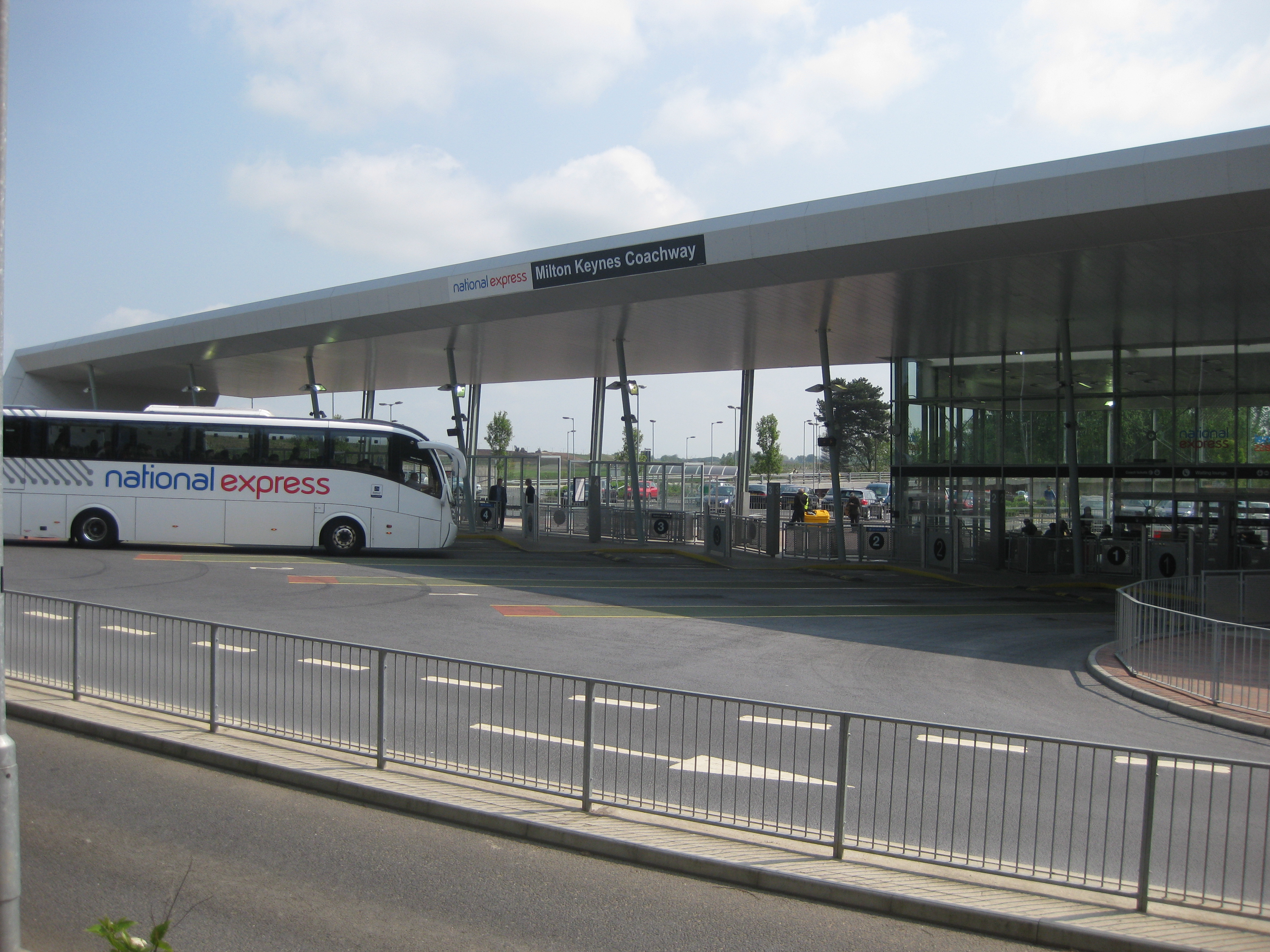
Exterior view of Milton Keynes Coachway

- Milton Keynes Coachway (near M1 Junction 14), in operation since 1989, is the UK's second busiest coach station. Its parking facility doubles as the local Park and Ride.
- Meadowhall Interchange (near M1 Junction 34) serves Sheffield.
- The Hard Interchange (at the end of the M275) serves Portsmouth.
- The Ferrytoll park and ride in south Fife is an important intermediate stop for many coach services between Edinburgh, Fife and the rest of Scotland.
- High Wycombe Coachway opened near Junction 4 of the M40 in January 2016.

Other coachway interchanges are less formal. The Reading Coachway on the M4 motorway is more like a bus stop in a supermarket car park.

== See also ==
- Coach transport in the United Kingdom
  - Victoria Coach Station in central London is the UK's busiest and had been in operation since 1932.
- Bus rapid transit (A general article about bus rapid transport - similar issues for coach rapid transport)
