= Stagecoach in Oxfordshire =

Bus and Coach operator

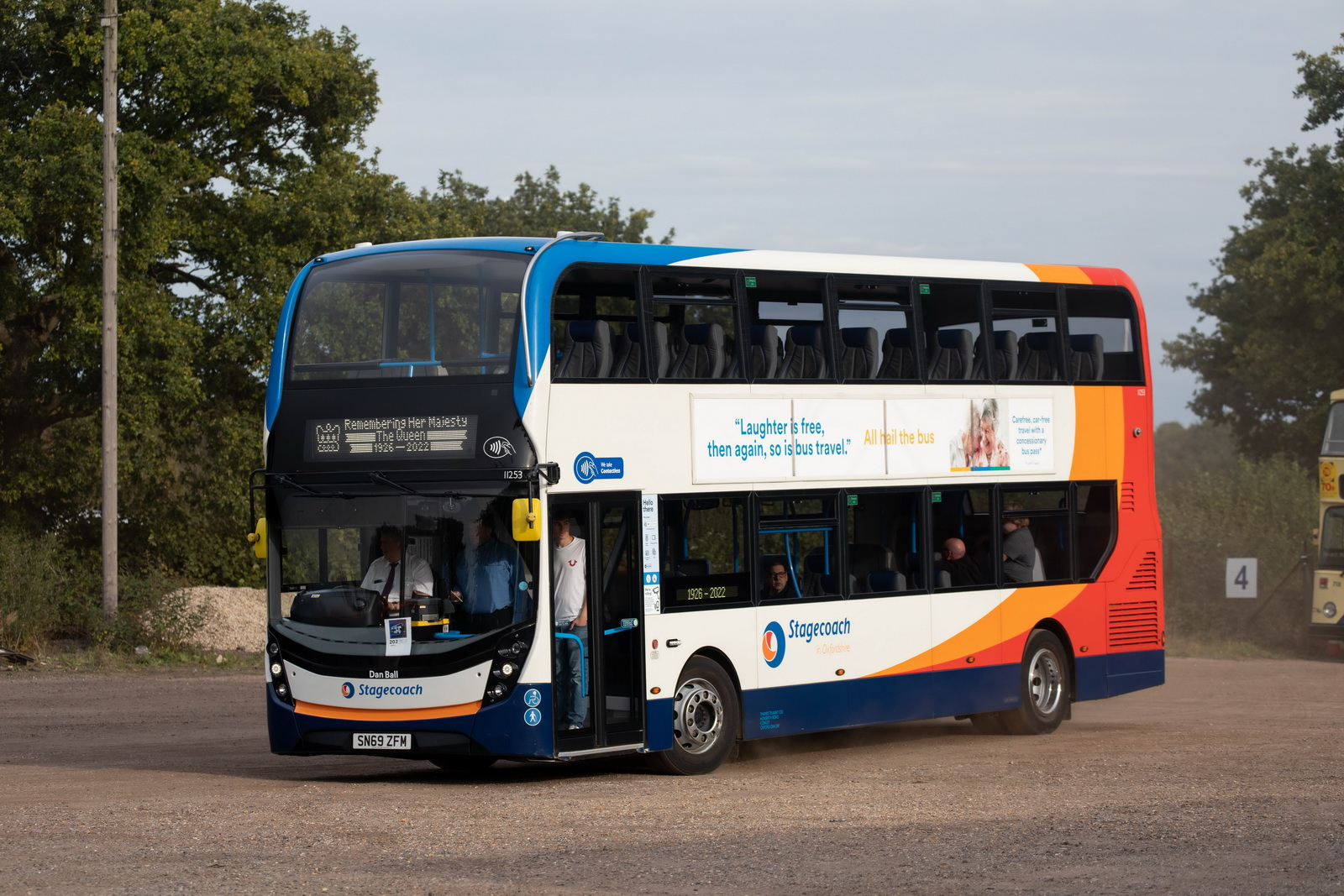
- A Stagecoach in Oxfordshire Alexander Dennis Enviro400 MMC at Showbus 2022
- Parent: Stagecoach Group
- Founded: 1997; 29 years ago
- Headquarters: Cowley, Oxford
- Service area: Oxfordshire (plus a few routes into adjacent counties)
- Service type: Bus and coach services
- Destinations: Banbury, Bicester, Brackley, Carterton, Chipping Norton, London, Oxford, Wantage, Witney
- Hubs: Banbury; Oxford; Witney
- Depots: Banbury; Oxford (Horspath Road); Witney
- Fleet: 179 (August 2017)
- Website: Stagecoach Bus

Stagecoach in Oxfordshire is the trading name of Thames Transit Ltd. It is a bus operator serving the county of Oxfordshire, England. Since 1997 has been a subsidiary of Stagecoach Group, and since February 2021 it has been part of Stagecoach West, managed from the latter's headquarters in Gloucester.

== History ==
In 1987 Harry Blundred, a former bus driver and controller from Devon, founded both Thames Transit and the Oxford Tube. In 1997 Stagecoach Group bought both operations from Blundred and merged them with Stagecoach Midland Red.

Stagecoach South Midlands operated four brands:

- Oxford Tube for express buses between Oxford and London Victoria
- Stagecoach in Banbury for local buses in and around Banbury
- Stagecoach in Oxford for local buses in and around Oxford
- Stagecoach in Warwickshire for local buses in Warwickshire

In July 2002 the Banbury and Oxford brands were merged as "Stagecoach in Oxfordshire". In March 2004 Stagecoach in Oxfordshire and Stagecoach in Warwickshire were split into two divisions with those names.

Stagecoach buses in Oxford historically competed with local buses operated by the Oxford Bus Company, but in 2010 it was announced that Oxford Bus Company and Stagecoach in Oxfordshire, in consultation with Oxfordshire County Council, had agreed a Bus Quality Partnership as enabled by the Local Transport Act 2008. The partnership would improved multi-operator ticketing across the City and co-ordinate bus timetables on the four busiest shared routes.

On 15 July 2010 Stagecoach in Oxfordshire introduced a fleet of 26 Alexander Dennis Enviro400H diesel-electric hybrid buses on Oxford – Cowley – Blackbird Leys route 1 and Oxford – Kidlington routes 7A/7B (now 2/2A/2B). Double deckers were chosen over single deckers as a result of the co-ordinated timetables and reduced frequencies to be introduced under the quality partnership. As newer buses joined the Oxfordshire fleet, the Enviro400H hybrids were transferred first to Oxford – Rose Hill route 3, then to Kidlington – Headington route 700 and now to Oxford – Cowley – Headington route 10.

In October 2016 Stagecoach announced the introduction of new electronic ticket machines to enable passengers to pay by contactless payment card or by smartphone using Apple Pay or Google Pay. Stagecoach in Oxfordshire was the first Stagecoach division to receive these new machines for both local services and the Oxford Tube, making Stagecoach in Oxfordshire the first major operator to accept contactless payments outside London.

In February 2021 Stagecoach Group announced that Stagecoach in Oxfordshire would merge with Stagecoach West as part of a revised business structure.

== Oxford Tube ==
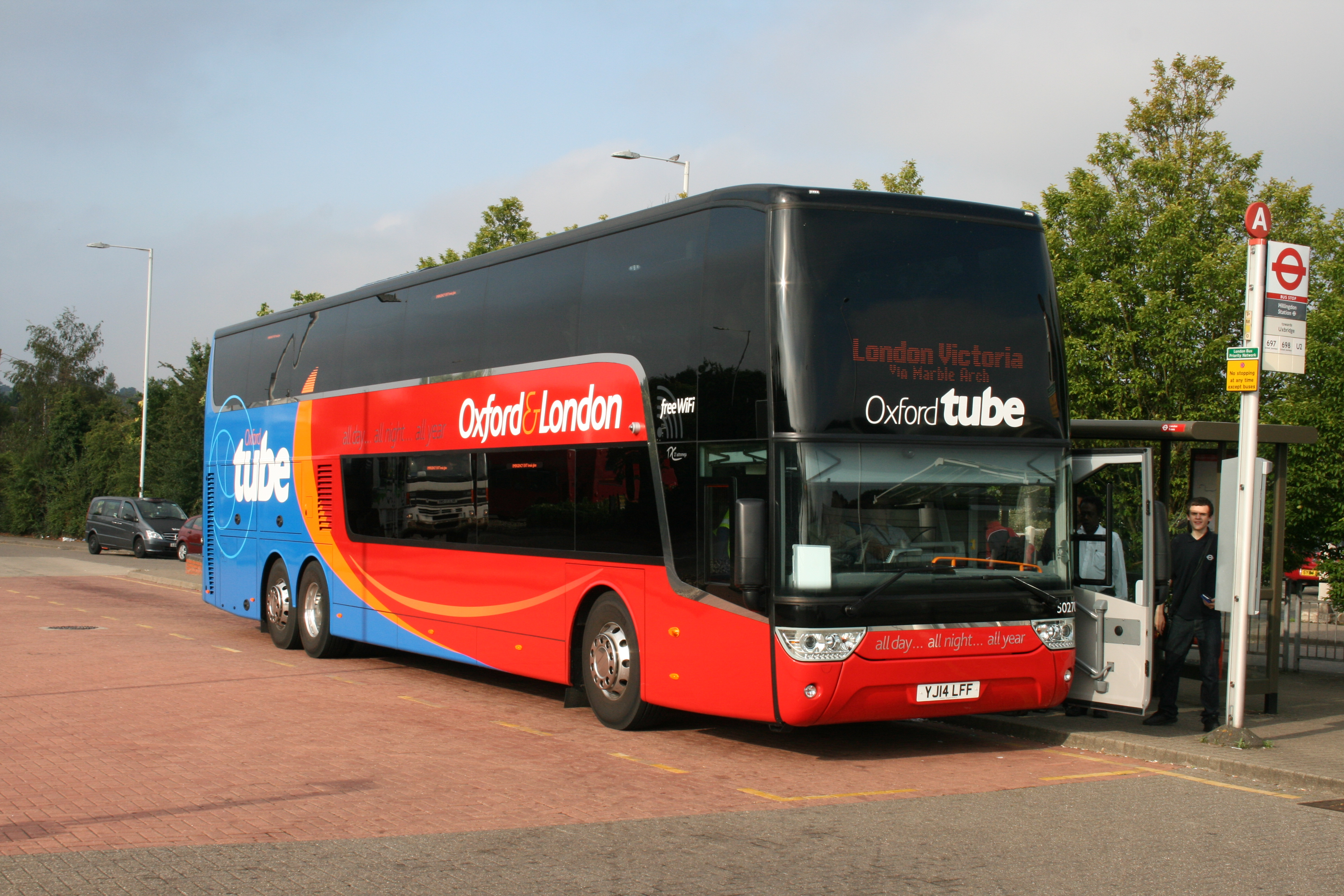
An old Oxford Tube VanHool Astromega coach at Hillingdon Station

The Oxford Tube currently operates a fleet of 32 Plaxton Panorama double decker coaches on limited stops services between Oxford and London Victoria.

On 3 March 2014 Stagecoach Group announced its biggest vehicle order to date. Costing Stagecoach over £100 million in total, it included 26 new VanHool TX Astromega coaches to operate the Oxford Tube service. The first of the new coaches entered service on 16 July 2014 with the entire fleet following shortly after. The new coaches increased comfort and facilities for passengers including more leg room, 4G WiFi, power sockets and USB ports in selected seats and a brand new audio information system providing passengers with departure and arrival information and the top deck also features a panoramic glass sun roof allowing more natural light into the coach.

In 2020, Stagecoach announced that it would replace their current Tube fleet with 34 new Plaxton Panorama vehicles, built on Volvo B11RLE chassis.

In 2023, Stagecoach added services via High Wycombe Coachway, and also starting in Carterton and operating via Witney and Eynsham.

== Stagecoach Gold ==
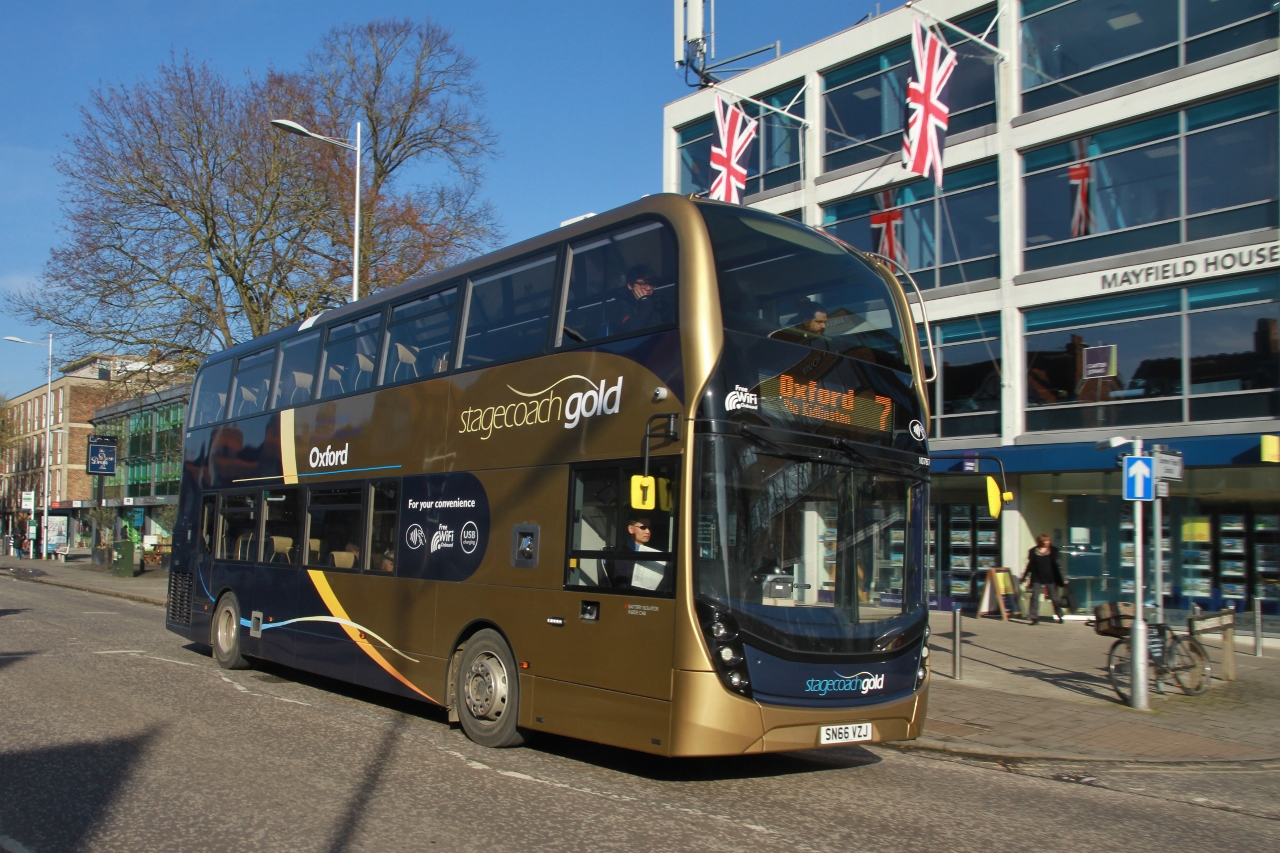
Stagecoach Gold branded Alexander Dennis Enviro400 MMC on route 7 in Summertown in November 2018

Stagecoach in Oxfordshire operates several routes under the premium Stagecoach Gold brand. The Stagecoach Gold brand was introduced in Oxfordshire in 2009 with the creation of the first S-Series (Superior Series) routes. The Stagecoach Gold brand is currently used on several long-distance routes in the county. The Gold branded buses feature a special Gold and blue coloured livery along with high-back leather seats and free on-board Wi-Fi (currently disabled due to running costs). The newer Gold vehicles used on routes S7/S3, and S9 also include USB charging ports. However, often the bus routes will not be operated by their "Gold" branded buses.

In addition to the routes operated by Stagecoach in Oxfordshire, Stagecoach West also operates route S6 which runs between Swindon and Oxford via Faringdon.

=== S3/NS3 – Chipping Norton/Charlbury to Oxford ===
In 2008 route 20, operating between Chipping Norton and Oxford, and route 20A, operating between Charlbury and Oxford, were combined to create route S3 operating alternately Oxford – Woodstock – Charlbury and Oxford – Woodstock – Chipping Norton. The service serves Blenheim Palace. Route S3 was upgraded to Stagecoach Gold status in September 2012 with the delivery of nine new Stagecoach Gold specification ADL Enviro400 bodied Scania N230UD buses for the service.

=== S5/NS5 – Bicester to Oxford ===
In 2009 routes 27/27A/27B/X27 between Bicester and Oxford were rebranded as route S5. The route was subsequently upgraded to Stagecoach Gold in January 2012 with a fleet of 11 new Gold branded Enviro400 buses.

=== S7 – Witney to Oxford ===
Route 7 was a new route created in January 2017 between Woodstock and Oxford via Kidlington and Oxford Parkway. Route 7 was given Stagecoach Gold status with brand new Enviro400 MMC vehicles delivered to Stagecoach in Oxfordshire in December 2016. This service now has been extended to Witney from Woodstock and has been renamed the S7 to match the Superior branding.

=== S9/NS9 – Wantage to Oxford ===
Routes X30, 31, and 34 between Wantage and Oxford were upgraded to Stagecoach Gold status in January 2017. The services received new Stagecoach Gold specification Enviro400 MMC vehicles that were delivered to Stagecoach in December 2016. Routes 31 and X30 were renumbered S8 & S9 respectively on 22 October 2017. In January 2022, services S8 and 34 passed to Thames Travel, the S8 was renumbered X1, furthermore the S9 had its frequency increased to every 20 minutes on Mondays to Saturdays & every 30 minutes on Sundays with funding from Oxfordshire County Council.

== National Express ==
Stagecoach Oxfordshire operated route 737 from Oxford Gloucester Green to Stansted Airport under contract to National Express from March 2007 until June 2013. This route is now operated on behalf of National Express by the Oxford Bus Company.

== Fleet ==
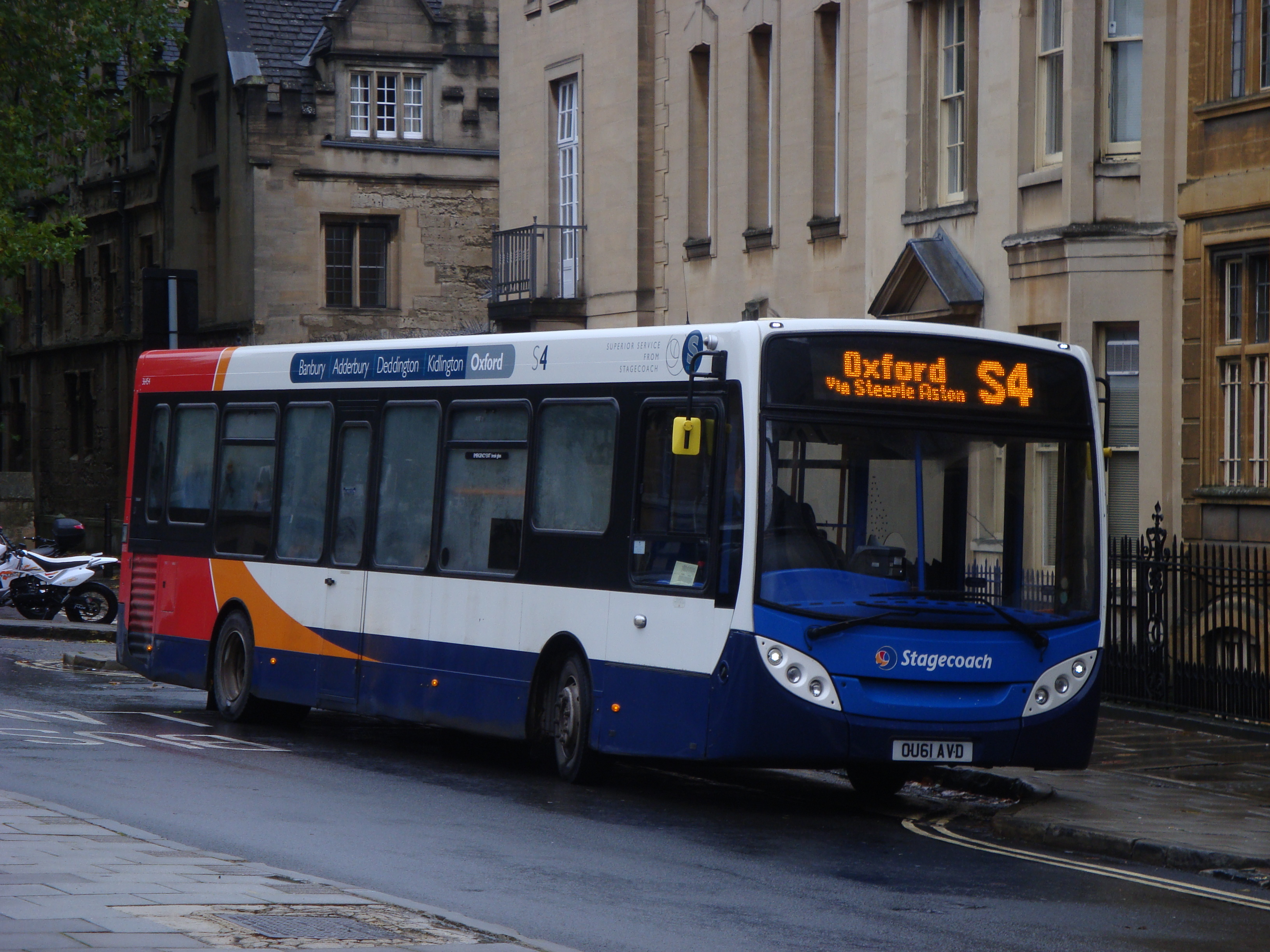
Alexander Dennis Enviro200 in Oxford in October 2014

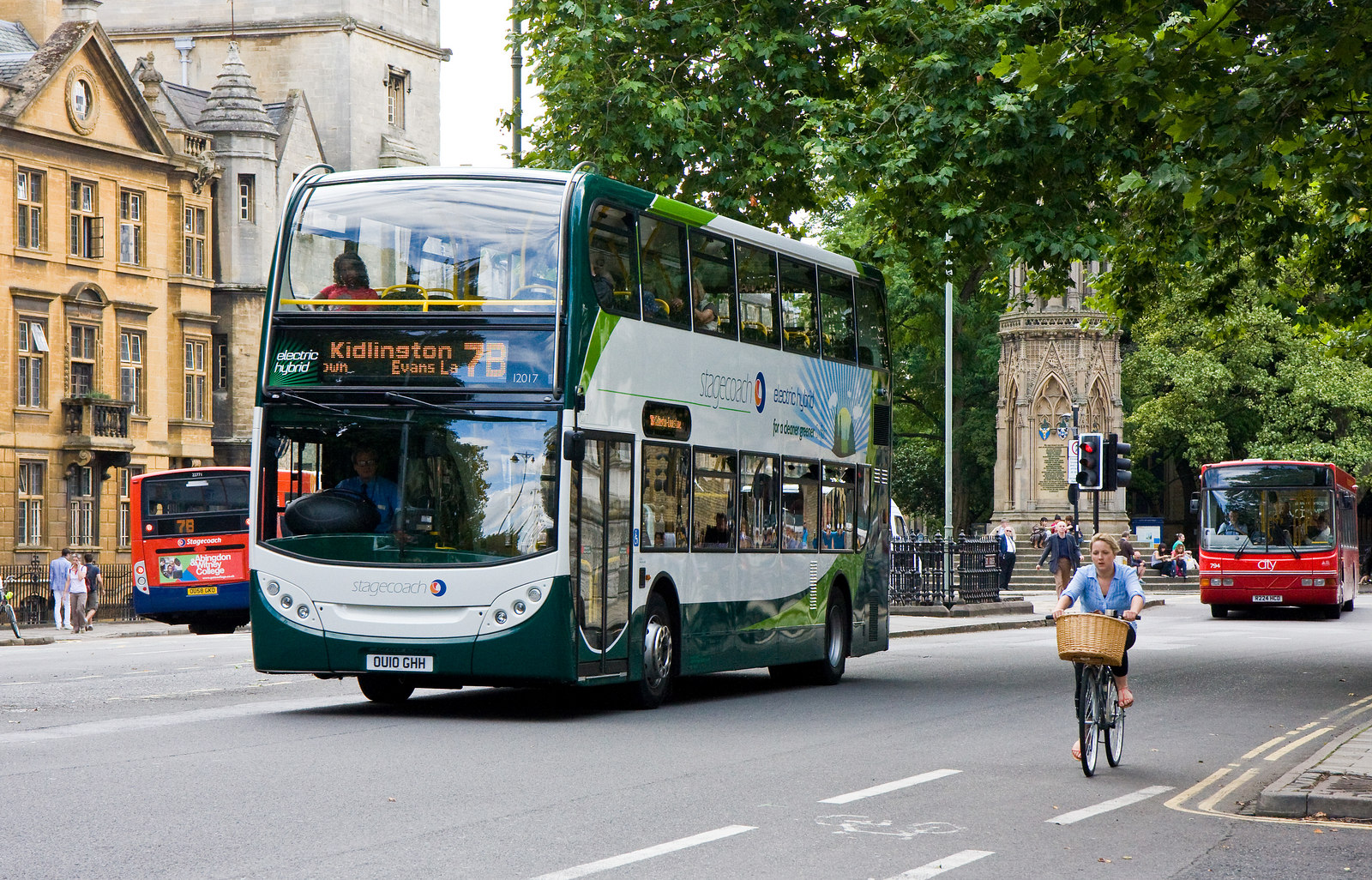
Alexander Dennis Enviro400H in Oxford in August 2010

As of December 2016, Stagecoach Oxfordshire operated a fleet of 176 buses.

Stagecoach Oxfordshire has a young fleet. This is partly due to Oxford's Low Emission Zone, which allows only buses with exhaust systems of at least Euro V standard or better to serve the city centre. Stagecoach Oxfordshire has replaced most of its fleet to meet this requirement.

== Depots ==
- Banbury, Canal Street
- Oxford, Horspath Road
- Witney, Corn Street

Oxford depot also has three out-stations at Bicester, Chipping Norton and Grove. Chipping Norton out-station has previously been used by Witney depot. Grove out-station houses the Wantage fleet. It used to house the Didcot fleet, but Stagecoach no longer operates in Didcot.

== Incidents ==
- In the early hours of the morning on 31 August 2010 Oxford Tube coach 50226 was involved in a serious accident on the M40 after a passenger on board attempted to grab the steering wheel. No-one was seriously injured, but the vehicle ended up on its side and sustained significant damage. The vehicle was eventually repaired and returned to service.
- On 14 December 2010 a double deck bus on route S1 from Oxford to Witney was involved in a collision with a taxi on Oxford Hill junction with Cogges Hill Road in Witney. The elderly female taxi driver was freed with hydraulic cutting equipment and she was then taken to the John Radcliffe Hospital with suspected facial and leg injuries. Three passengers from the bus were taken to a nearby hospital as a precaution.
- On 14 May 2012 the engine of bus 22766 caught fire in Cumnor while on route X30 from Wantage to Oxford. No passengers were injured in this incident and the bus was eventually repaired and returned to service.
- On 4 October 2014 bus 15609 was involved in a collision with a car which resulted in both vehicles ending up in an embankment at the side of the A40 between Witney and Eynsham. As a result, the A40 was closed between Eynsham roundabout and Witney while emergency services dealt with the incident. No-one was seriously injured but a few people were taken to hospital as a precaution. The bus involved has since been repaired and returned to service.

== See also ==
- Oxford Tube
- Stagecoach West
- Stagecoach Gold
- List of bus companies
