= Stagecoach West =

Bus operator in the West of England

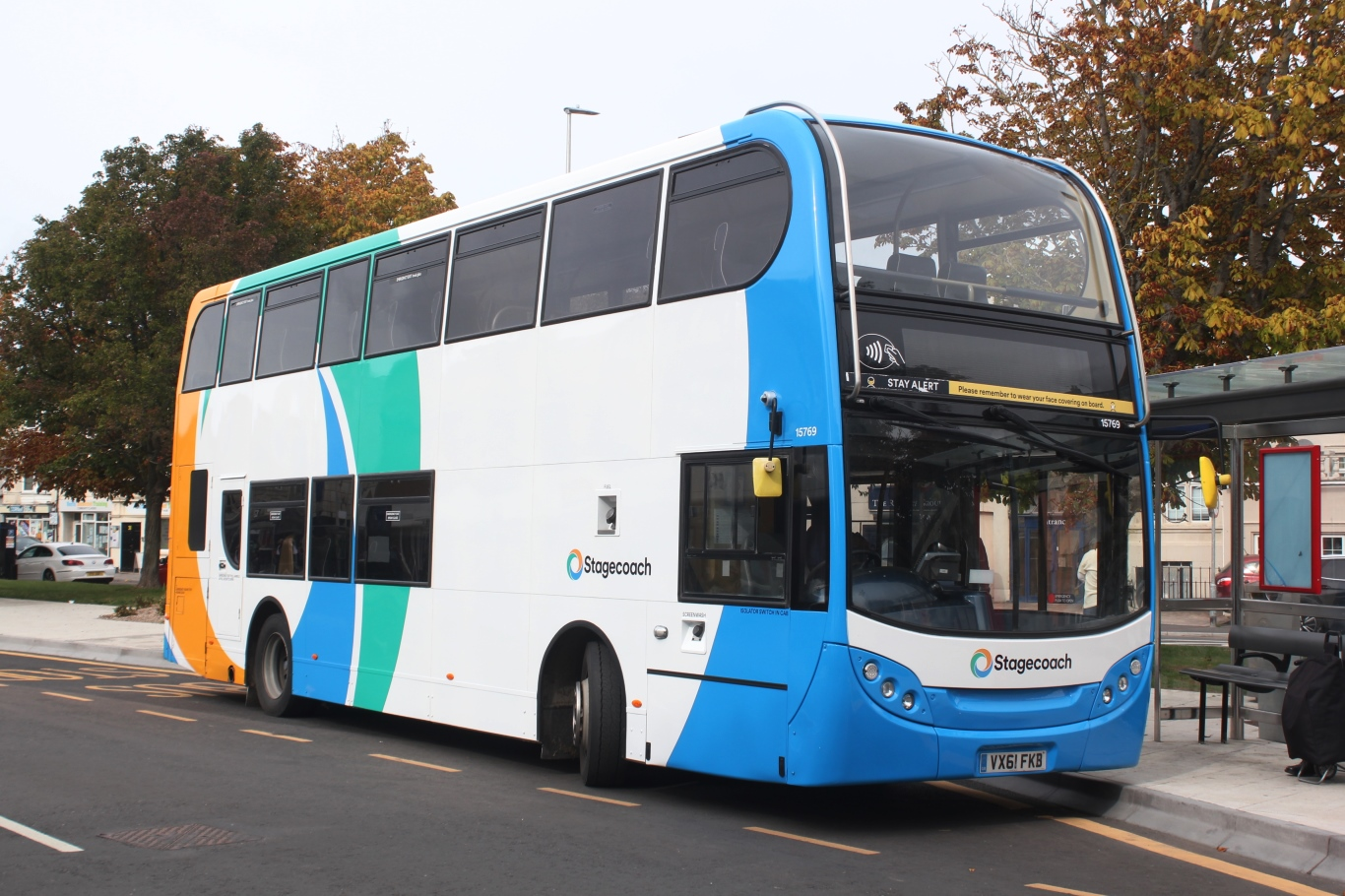
- Alexander Dennis Enviro400 bodied Scania N230UD in Weston-super-Mare, North Somerset in October 2022
- Parent: Stagecoach Group
- Founded: 11 September 1983; 43 years ago
- Headquarters: Gloucester
- Service area: Gloucestershire; Herefordshire; Wiltshire; Oxfordshire; Swindon
- Service type: Bus and coach
- Depots: 6
- Fleet: 270 (October 2022)
- Annual ridership: 24.9 million (2018/19)
- Managing director: Martin Gibbon
- Website: Official website

Stagecoach West is a bus operator providing services in Gloucestershire, Swindon, Oxfordshire, Wiltshire and Herefordshire, in the West of England, and Monmouthshire in the South-East of Wales. The company is a subsidiary of the Stagecoach Group. The company's managing director is Martin Gibbon.

== History ==
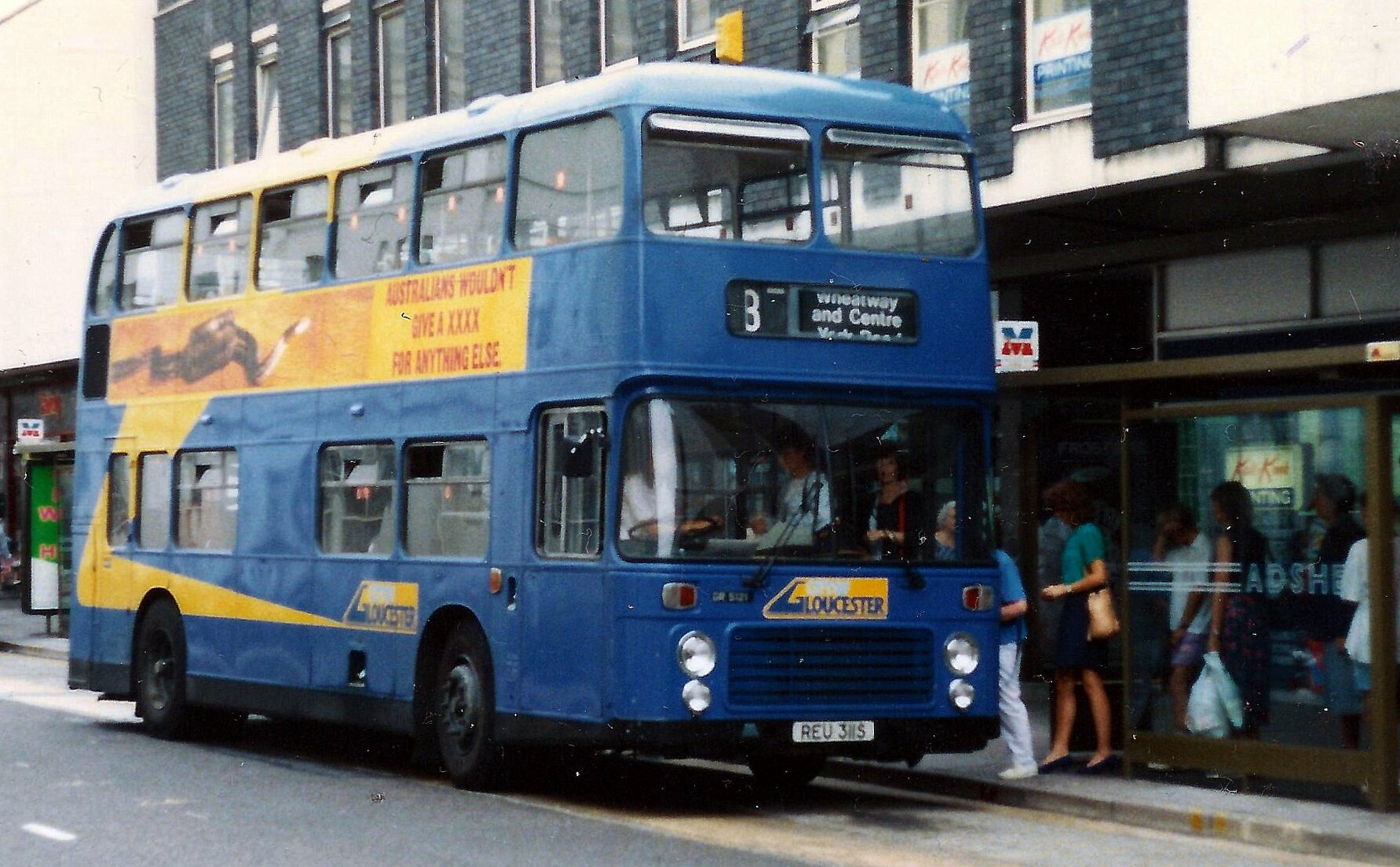
A Cheltenham and Gloucester Bristol VRT on Clarence Street, Gloucester

On 11 September 1983, the National Bus Company (NBC) split its loss-making Bristol Omnibus operation into three separate companies, with Gloucestershire-based operations transferred to a new company named the Cheltenham and Gloucester Omnibus Company. The NBC's National Travel (South) coaching operation was transferred to Cheltenham and Gloucester during 1984, while the Swindon and District bus operation followed in 1985. In 1986, in preparation for the break-up of the National Bus Company as a result of bus deregulation, all company assets were transferred to a new legal entity named Western Travel.

Western Travel was the fourth NBC subsidiary to be privatised following deregulation, being purchased in a £1 million (equivalent to £2,987,000 in 2025) management buyout in November 1986. The Cheltenham and Gloucester and Swindon and District companies were maintained as subsidiaries, joined in December 1987 by Midland Red South following Western Travel's purchase of the company. Among other acquisitions in and around their operating area, the company went on to acquire the eastern division of National Welsh Omnibus Services in February 1991, reforming the division as a reconstituted Red & White Services, which was based out of depots in Cwmbran, Chepstow, Brynmawr and Crosskeys, with an additional depot in Merthyr Tydfil opening in May 1993.

After having also purchased the independent Circle Line of Gloucester earlier in the year, Western Travel was purchased by Stagecoach Holdings in November 1993 for £9.25 million (equivalent to £19,906,000 in 2025). Red & White's Welsh operations were transferred to what is today Stagecoach South Wales, with the remainder of Western Travel eventually rebranded as Stagecoach West.

Having worked in partnership with the company's owners from 2017 onwards, in September 2019, Stagecoach West took over the 53-vehicle South Gloucestershire Bus & Coach business for an undisclosed sum after the SGBC's owners decided to step down. This takeover saw 100 employees transferring to Stagecoach West, with Stagecoach taking on SGBC's existing local bus and private hire work in the Bristol area, as well as their Megabus contract.

In February 2021, it was announced that Stagecoach West was to merge with neighbouring Stagecoach Oxfordshire, with the headquarters of the combined operating company located in Gloucester. Stagecoach West took over the operations of Stagecoach Oxfordshire's three depots in Banbury, Oxford and Witney and outstations at Bicester, Chipping Norton and Grove, along with around 500 vehicles and the Oxford Tube coach service between Oxford and London. Stagecoach West's operations in Bristol, based from a depot in Patchway, were transferred to Stagecoach South Wales in late 2025 amid speculation towards bus franchising in the West of England Combined Authority area.

In July 2026, it was announced that Stagecoach West would introduce new ticketing machines allowing passengers to track the location of the bus and see real-time journey information, with plans for tap-on tap-off in later updates. This comes after over five years of Swindon's Bus Company already using the technology, having introduced it in September 2021.

== Fleet and depots ==
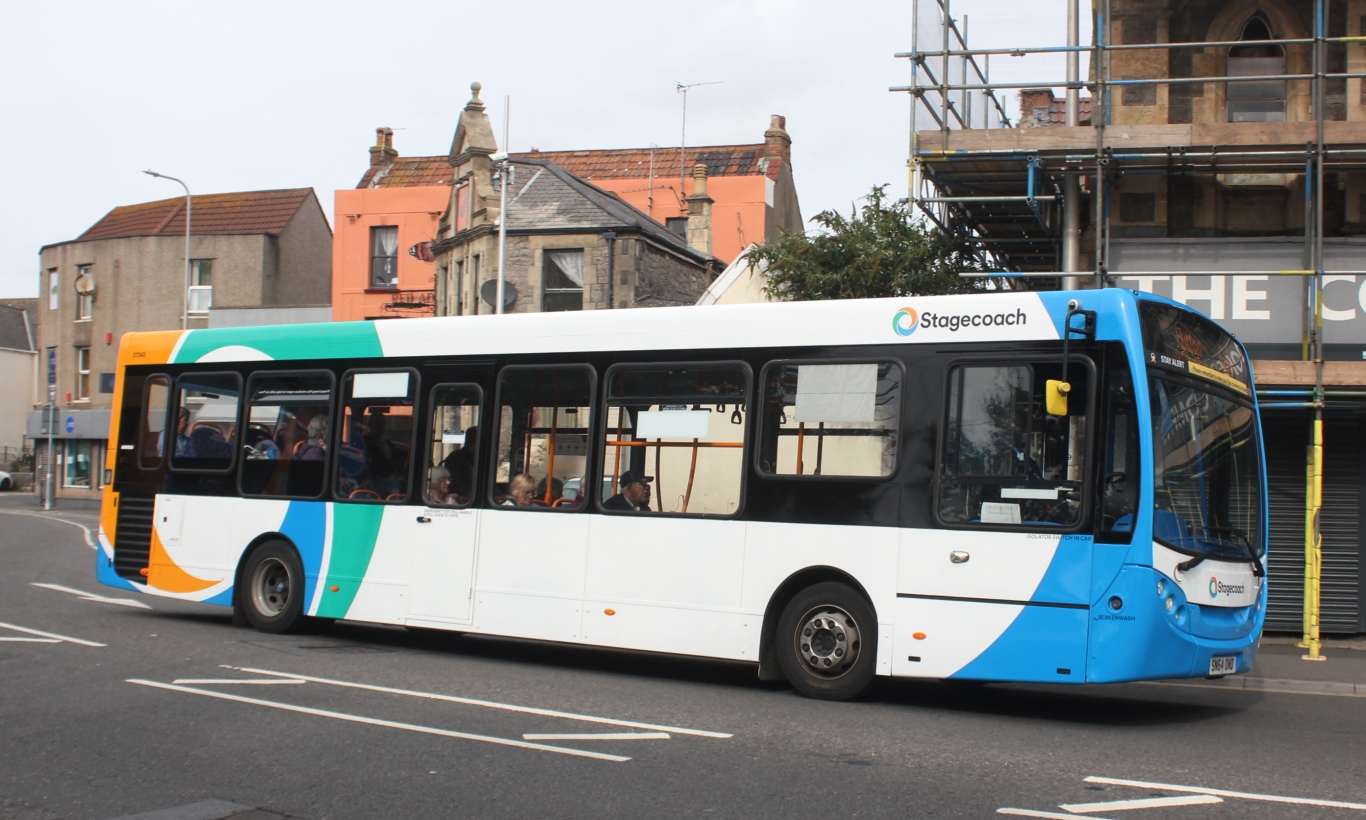
Alexander Dennis Enviro200 in Weston-super-Mare in October 2022

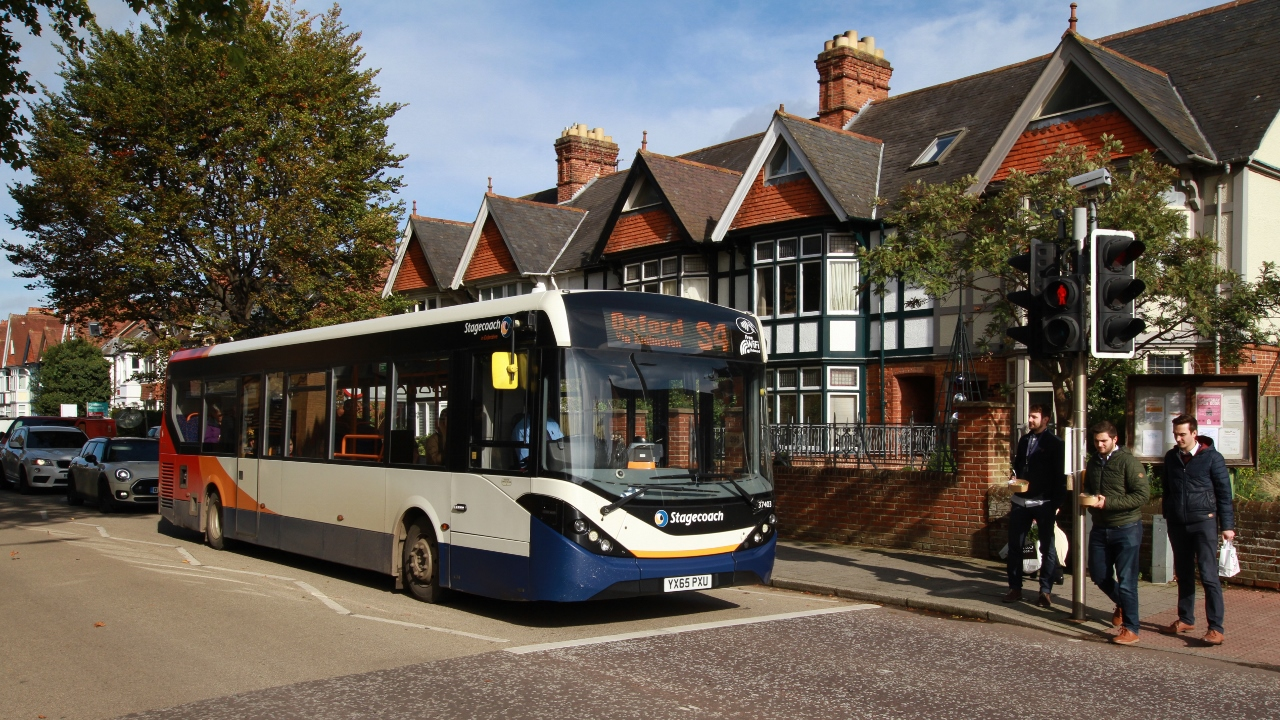
Alexander Dennis Enviro200 MMC in Oxford in October 2019

As of October 2022, the Stagecoach West fleet consists of 270 buses and coaches operating from six depots:

- Banbury (Canal Street)
- Cheltenham (Lansdown Industrial Estate, Gloucester Road)
- Gloucester (London Road)
- Oxford (Horspath Road)
- Stroud (London Road)
- Swindon (Cheney Manor Industrial Estate)
- Witney (Corn Street)

There are also outstations at Bicester, Coleford, Chipping Norton and Grove.

== Services ==
Stagecoach West mainly operates local bus services in Gloucestershire, Herefordshire, Wiltshire, Oxfordshire and into South Gloucestershire, although some routes serve more distant destinations including Brackley, Hereford, Monmouth and Bath.

=== Stagecoach Gold ===
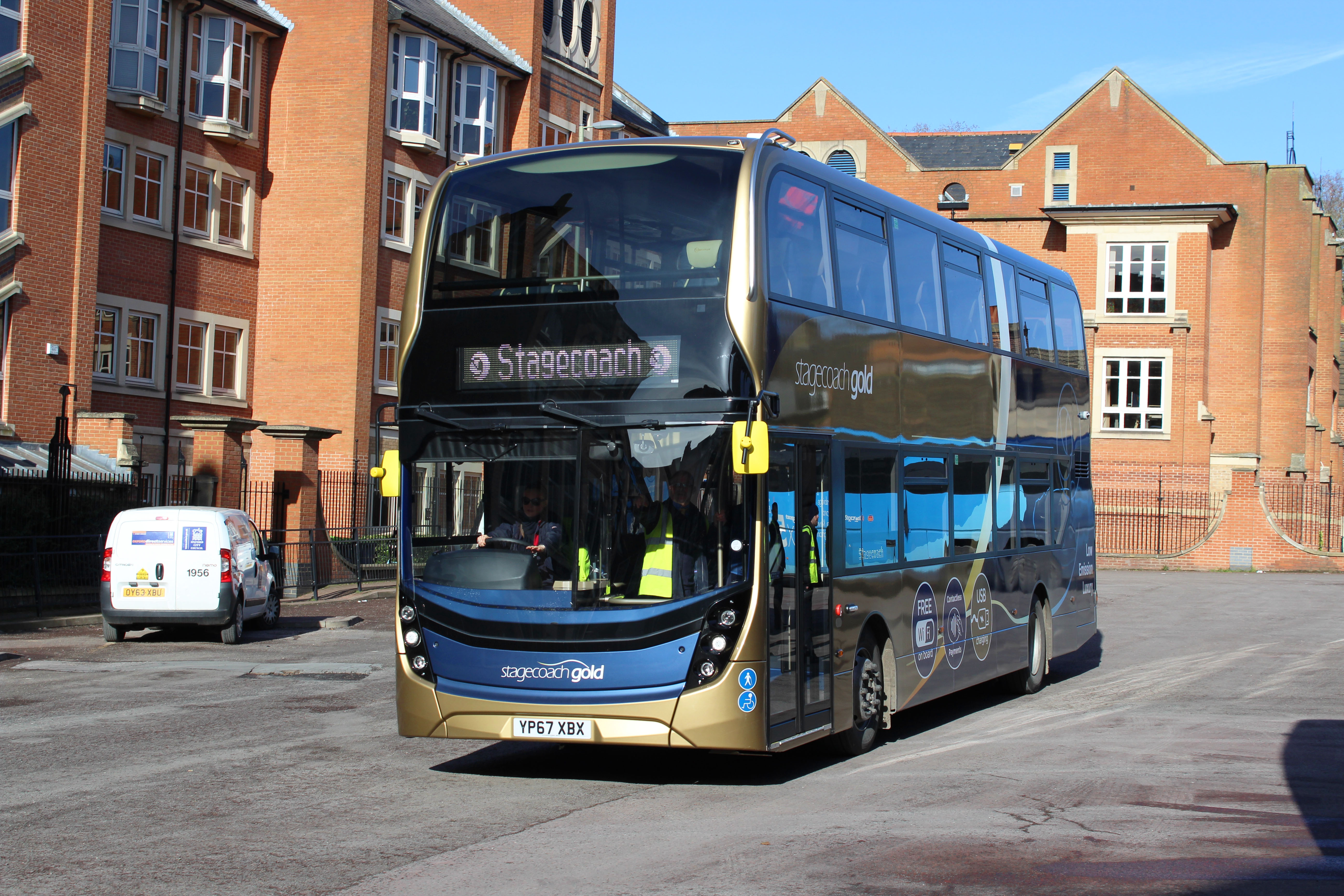
Stagecoach Gold liveried Alexander Dennis Enviro400 MMC in Oxford in February 2018

Routes branded as Stagecoach Gold have vehicles of a higher specification and provide more frequent, higher profile or interurban journeys. These services are:

- 55 Chippenham to Swindon
- 94/94X Cheltenham to Gloucester
- S3 Chipping Norton/Charlbury to Oxford
- S5 Bicester to Oxford
- S6 Swindon to Oxford
- S7 Witney to Oxford
- S9 Wantage to Oxford

Gloucester depot's 10 and 97/98 services were previously among these Gold routes, but in June 2021, 21 new Alexander Dennis Enviro400 MMC bodied Scania N250UD double-decker buses in the group's replacement "Long Distance" livery were delivered for service on the routes.

=== Oxford Tube ===
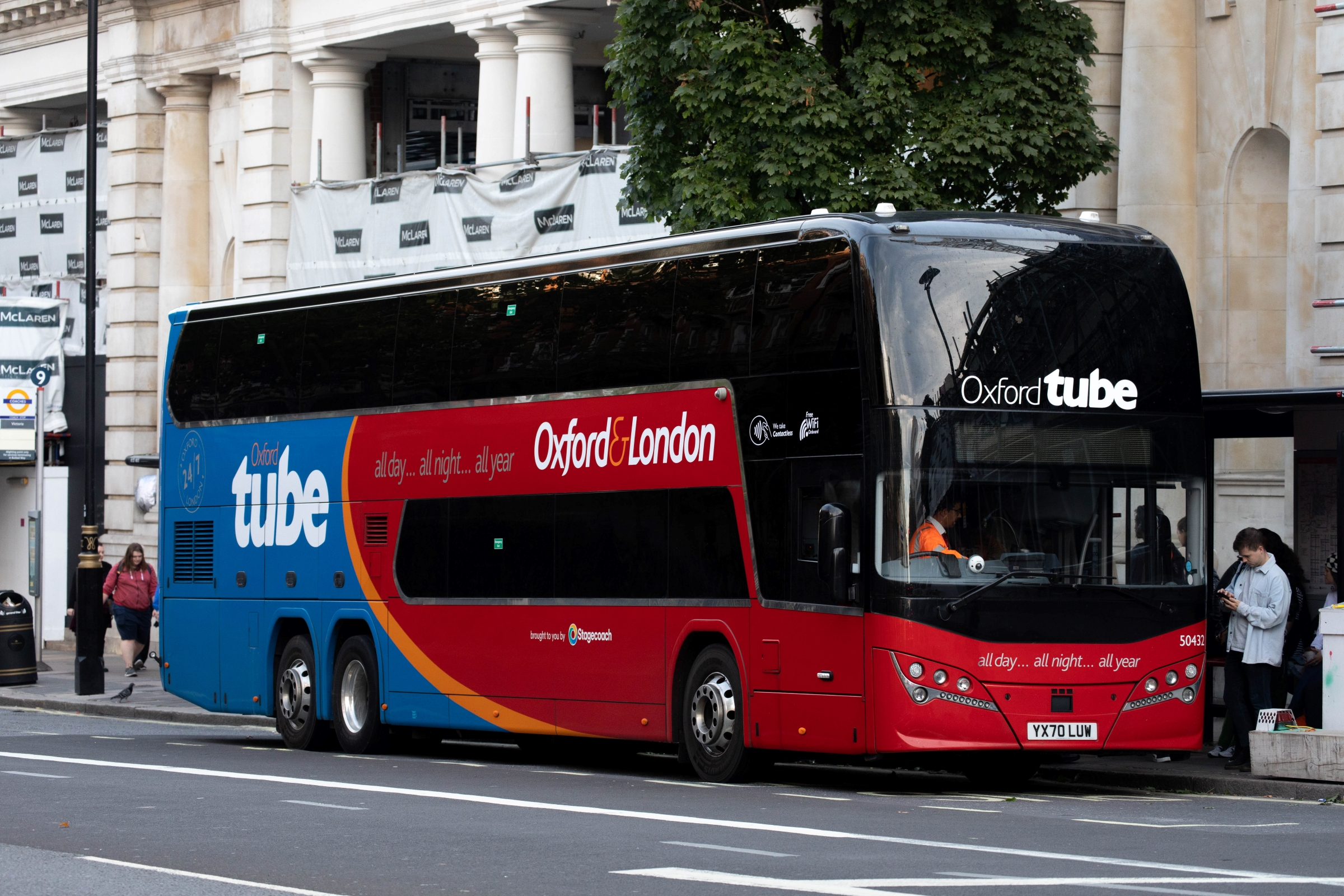
Oxford Tube Plaxton Panorama bodied Volvo B11RLE at Victoria Coach Station in September 2022

The Oxford Tube service is a limited-stop express coach service between Oxford and Victoria Coach Station in London, using a fleet of 34 Plaxton Panorama double-decker coaches on Volvo B11RLE chassis, uniquely equipped with solar panels on the roof, which began to enter service on the route from October 2020. The service was founded in 1987 by Thames Transit in competition with the Oxford Bus Company's X90 service, withdrawn in January 2020 as it had become unprofitable, and was originally operated by Stagecoach Oxfordshire before being included in the merger with Stagecoach West in February 2021.

=== Oxford SmartZone ===
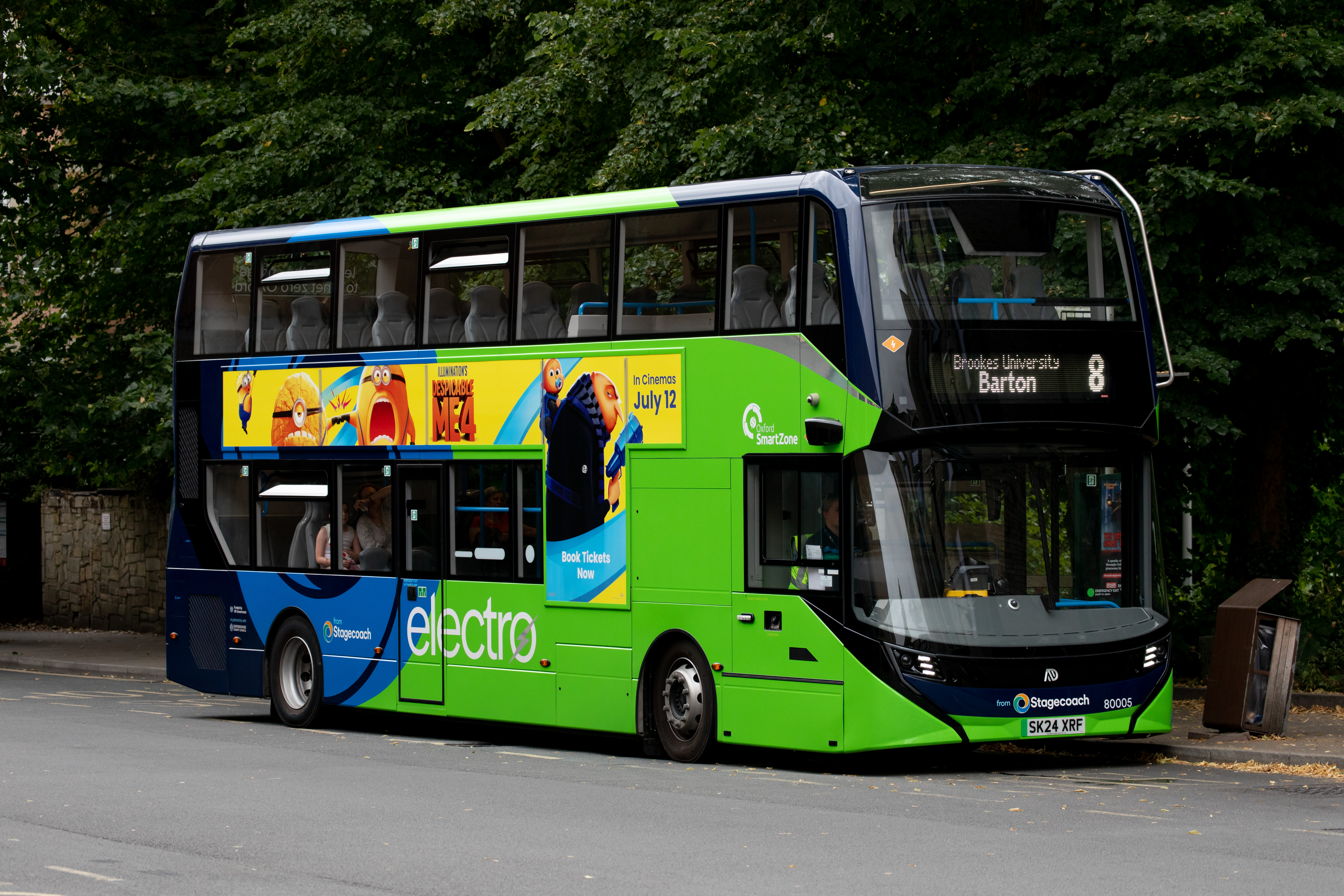
Oxford SmartZone-branded Alexander Dennis Enviro400EV on the London Road in Oxford in July 2024

Stagecoach West's operations in the City of Oxford, in partnership with the Oxford Bus Company, are part of Oxford SmartZone joint ticketing scheme, launched on 24 July 2011 as a successor to the Plus+Pass scheme, which had ceased operations three years earlier. This ticketing scheme, introduced by Oxfordshire County Council following the passage of the Local Transport Act 2008, allowed for bus users in Oxford to buy and use one paper ticket until its expiry on services operated by both Stagecoach and the Oxford Bus Company, who worked with the council to introduce coordinated service timetables using a fleet of 46 new double-decker buses.

On 15 January 2024, the Oxford SmartZone was officially relaunched as an enhanced partnership between Stagecoach West and the Oxford Bus Company, with the aim to reduce bus journey times by 10%. Orders for battery electric buses have been funded for both operators, with Stagecoach West taking delivery of the first of 55 'electro'-branded Alexander Dennis Enviro400EVs for use in the Oxford SmartZone area in March 2024.

== See also ==
- Stagecoach Oxfordshire
- Buses in Bristol
- Buses in Swindon
