= Oxford to London coach route =

Coach route in Southern England

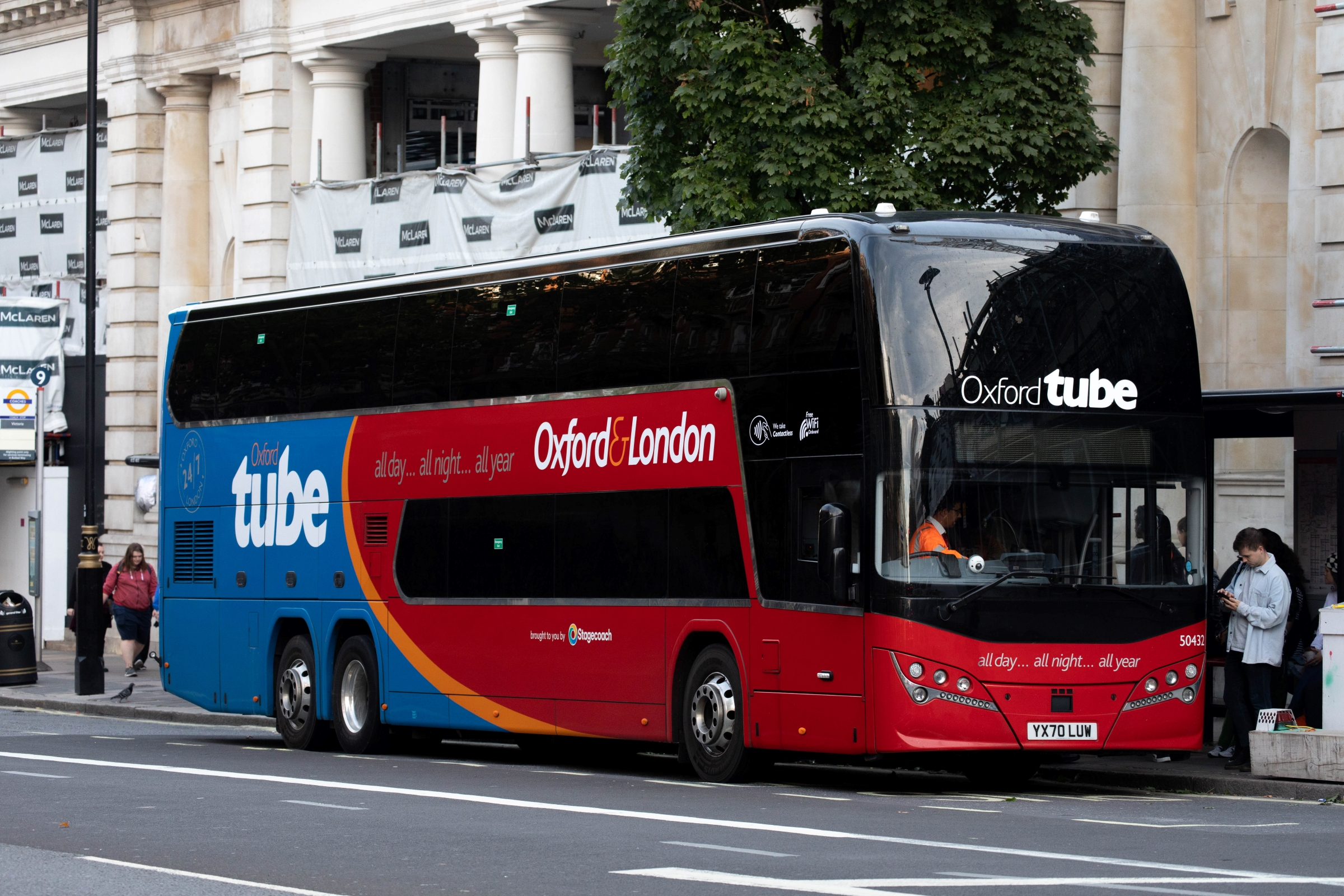
- Oxford Tube Plaxton Panorama bodied Volvo B11RLE at Victoria Coach Station in 2022

Overview
- Operator: Stagecoach West
- Garage: Cowley
- Vehicle: Plaxton Panorama bodied Volvo B11RLEs

Route
- Start: Oxford, Gloucester Green; Carterton, Crossroads (Early morning & Late afternoon trips only)
- Via: Minster Lovell (Early morning & Late afternoon trips only); Witney (Early morning & Late afternoon trips only); Lewknor; High Wycombe Coachway; Hillingdon; Shepherd's Bush; Baker Street
- End: London, Buckingham Palace Road

Service
- Level: Daily
- Frequency: Up to every 12 minutes

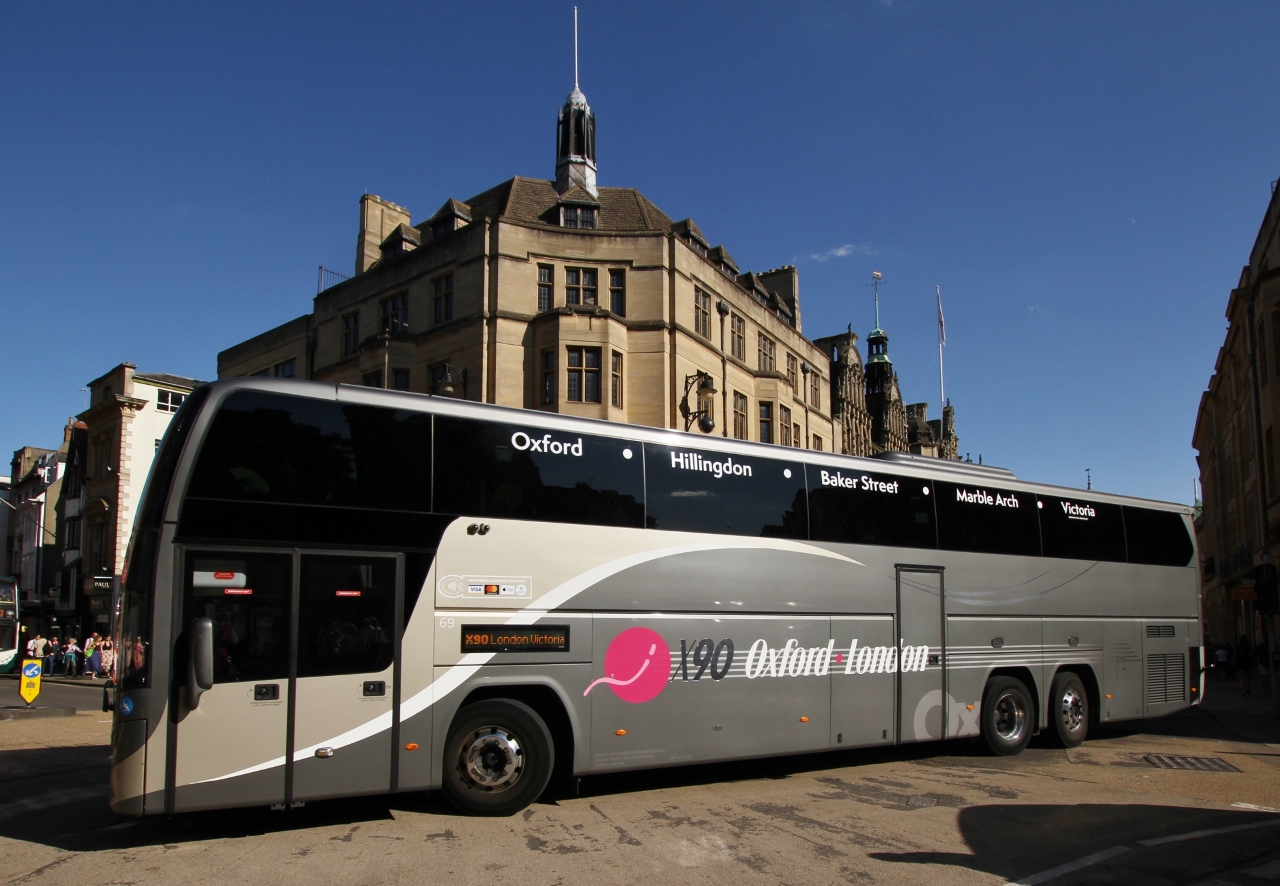
- Oxford Bus Company Plaxton Elite I bodied Volvo B11R in August 2017

Overview
- Operator: Oxford Bus Company
- Garage: Cowley
- Vehicle: Plaxton Elite I bodied Volvo B11Rs
- Ended service: 4 January 2020; 6 years ago

Route
- Start: Oxford, Gloucester Green
- Via: Baker Street
- End: London, Victoria Coach Station,

Service
- Level: Daily
- Frequency: Every 30 minutes

The Oxford to London coach route is an express coach route between Oxford and London along the M40 motorway. Operated by Stagecoach West under the brand name Oxford Tube, there are up to five coaches an hour via Lewknor, High Wycombe Coachway, Hillingdon, Shepherd's Bush and Baker Street terminating on Buckingham Palace Road, Victoria.

The former X90 route, which was operated by the Oxford Bus Company, ran up to two coaches an hour via Baker Street, also terminating on Buckingham Palace Road. This service was withdrawn in January 2020, with the reasons stated being reducing passenger numbers, traffic congestion, and competition from railway services.

== Oxford Tube ==
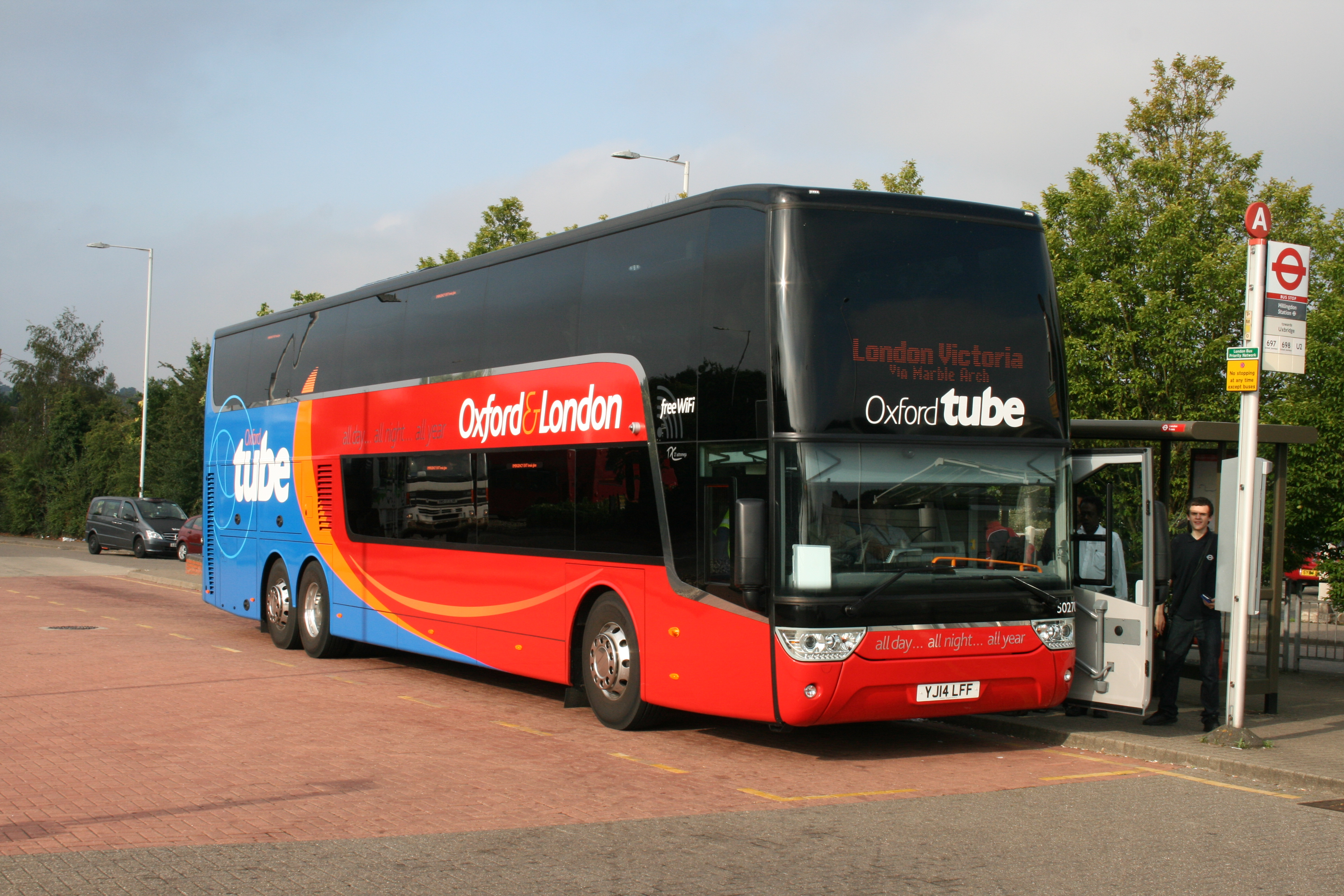
Oxford Tube Van Hool Astromega TDX27 at Hillingdon tube station in July 2014

The Oxford Tube, launched by Thames Transit in 1987, operates a fleet of Plaxton Panorama bodied Volvo B11RLE double-decker coaches. Rather than turn over its fleet a little at a time on a rotating basis, Oxford Tube renews its entire fleet at once, every five years.

Tickets are also sold via the Megabus network. As of September 2017, it was the highest frequency long-distance coach service in the United Kingdom.

== Oxford Bus Company X90 ==
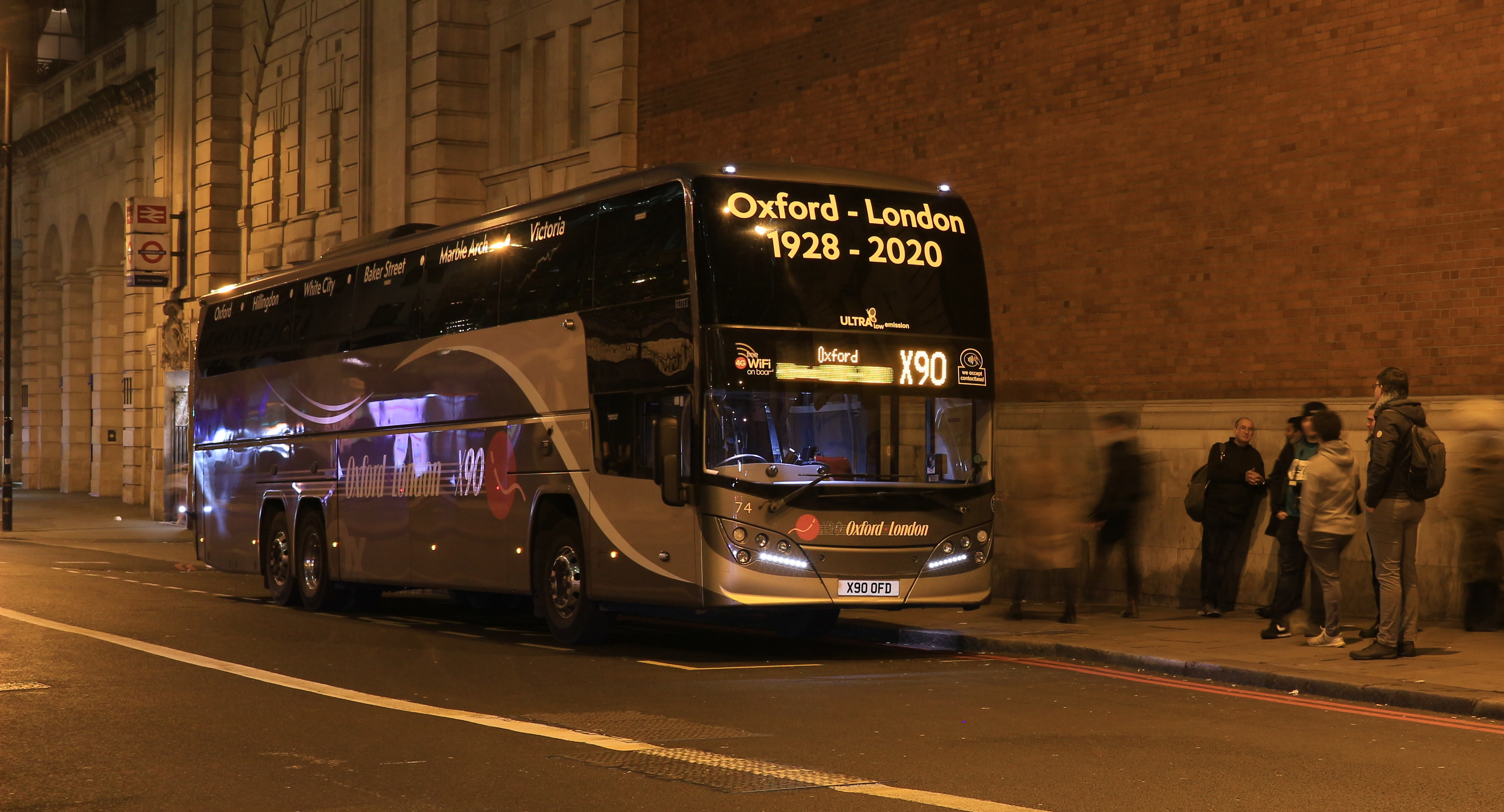
The final Oxford Bus Company X90 coach at Victoria.

The Oxford Bus Company operated the X90 service every 15 minutes at peak times, using eight Plaxton Elite bodied Volvo B11Rs. From October 2018, the service was reduced to every 30 minutes, and was withdrawn from 4 January 2020, due to a 35% fall in passenger numbers since 2015 causing the route to be unprofitable.

== History ==
=== Early history ===
In 1919 William Beesley of Oxford formed a company called South Midland Motor Services and by 1924 offered excursions to London by charabanc. This became a daily service, and by 1928 it had become a regular coach service picking up and setting down passengers en route.

South Midland had competitors. By 1930, 18 companies were running a total of 58 coach services between Oxford and London every day. After the Road Traffic Act 1930, the competitors quickly reduced to two: South Midland and Varsity Express. Varsity Express used the A40 via High Wycombe and Uxbridge, South Midland ran via Henley-on-Thames, Maidenhead and Slough.

In 1933 the Eastern Counties Omnibus Company acquired Varsity Express (which also ran a service between London and Eastern Counties' base at Cambridge). In 1934, the Tilling Group (Eastern Counties' parent) moved the Oxford service of Varsity Express to a closer group company, United Counties Omnibus.

In 1934, South Midland was running seven journeys a day, and Varsity Express ran eight journeys a day. The day return fare was 6/- (30p).

=== Nationalisation ===
In 1942 the Government compelled coach operators to suspend operations. In 1945 South Midland was sold to Red & White Services. Operations resumed in 1946, but by 1950 both Red & White and United Counties had been nationalised and were controlled by the British Transport Commission (BTC). The BTC transferred control of South Midland to Thames Valley Traction, and in 1952 transferred the United Counties service to South Midland. During the 1950s and 1960s, South Midland ran coaches between Oxford and London about every hour, alternating between the High Wycombe and Henley routes.

Non-stop coaches started in 1963, reducing the journey time to 2 hours 15 minutes. In 1968 the City of Oxford Motor Services (COMS, nowadays trading as Oxford Bus Company), the company which ran local bus services in and around Oxford, became state-owned when British Electric Traction sold its UK bus interests to the government's Transport Holding Company. The result was that both South Midland and COMS became subsidiaries of the THC (to which BTC had transferred its South Midland shares in 1963). At the beginning of 1971 the state-owned National Bus Company (the THC's successor) merged South Midland with COMS, which adopted the trading name Oxford South Midland. The two South Midland routes were combined with COMS's bus routes from Oxford to High Wycombe and Henley, and given numbers: route 30 (Oxford-Henley-London) and route 70 (Oxford-High Wycombe-London), changed to 390 and 290 in 1975.

The M40 motorway between London and Oxford was opened in stages from 1967 to 1974. Occasional non-stop services used the motorway, but in 1977 a regular non-stop service was started as route 190, later renumbered X90. In the 1980s a non-stop service, the X70, was also started between Oxford and Heathrow Airport.

In the 1980s the 290 stopping service was combined with Green Line's London to High Wycombe route.

=== Privatisation and competition ===
The UK express coach sector was deregulated by the Transport Act 1980 and the UK bus market by the Transport Act 1985.

In 1983, COMS was split into two in preparation for deregulation. Whilst most of the services outside Oxford itself were transferred to a new company, South Midland Limited, the London services remained with COMS, which was sold in a management buyout in January 1987.

Competition appeared in 1987 when Thames Transit, commenced operating in Oxford and started its own express service to London, branded the Oxford Tube. The Oxford Bus Company branded its service Oxford Citylink. Competition on the non-stop routes became fierce. Both companies were taken over: Oxford Bus Company by Go-Ahead Group in 1994 and Thames Transit by Stagecoach in 1997. Both companies continued to innovate, with better coaches, more frequent services, Wifi on board, and all-night services. The Oxford Tube brand has endured, whereas the Oxford Bus Company's London route was rebranded the Oxford Express in 2000, espress in 2004, and X90 Oxford-London in 2012. The Heathrow service was rebranded the Airline in 2001.

In 2003, Stagecoach introduced Megabus to the route, using different termini in both Oxford and London. However, in November 2004 the Megabus service was replaced by dedicated seats on the Oxford Tube. In 2021, operation of the Oxford Tube was transferred to Stagecoach West as part of its merger with Stagecoach in Oxfordshire.

== Incidents ==
On 30 August 2010, a drunken 21-year-old grabbed hold of the steering wheel of an Oxford Tube coach and caused it to overturn on an embankment on the M40. The offender was sentenced to 12 months in prison.

On 11 December 2010 at 23:00, an Oxford Tube coach overturned on leaving the M40. Seventeen passengers and the driver were taken to the John Radcliffe Hospital with five people needing surgery for broken bones. The driver was convicted of driving without due care and attention having been charged but acquitted of dangerous driving; he was fined £750 and banned from driving for 12 months.
