= Plaxton Panorama =

Double decker coach bodywork

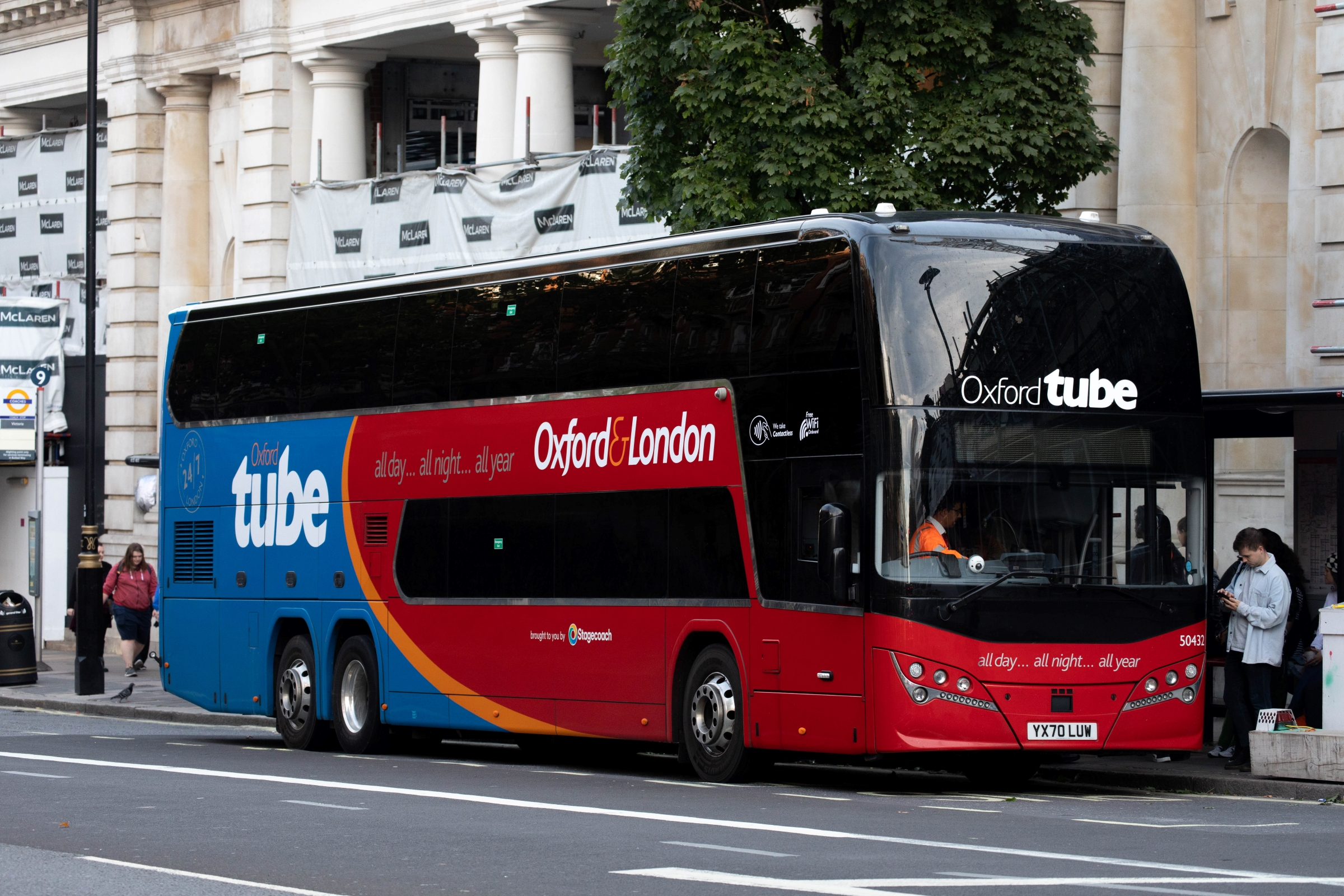
- Stagecoach Oxfordshire Plaxton Panorama bodied Volvo B11RLE in September 2022

Overview
- Manufacturer: Plaxton
- Production: 2018-2021
- Assembly: Scarborough, England

Dimensions
- Length: 14.50 metres (47.6 ft)
- Width: 2.55 metres (8 ft 4 in)
- Height: 3.95 metres (13.0 ft)

The Plaxton Panorama is a double decker coach body manufactured by Plaxton's Scarborough factory on the Volvo B11RLE chassis.

The Panorama was launched in 2018, and in standard configuration seats 87 with a toilet, or 91 without. It was the first double deck coach manufactured by Plaxton since the Paramount 4000 was discontinued in 1990.

== Customers ==
Stagecoach West Scotland ordered 5 Plaxton Panorama double decker coaches for use on the X76 express service between Kilmarnock and Glasgow in 2018. Stagecoach Oxfordshire purchased 34 for the Oxford Tube service. Eighteen were purchased by Parks of Hamilton and Stagecoach West Scotland for use on Scottish Citylink services.

== Suspension of production ==
In March 2024, Alexander Dennis announced that production of all Plaxton coaches would be suspended for at least two years, owing to factory capacity being required for the Enviro EV range of buses. Mark Williams, writing in Bus & Coach Buyer, lamented that the Panorama had "failed to get the traction" that he considered "it richly deserved", and strongly suspected, with the Volvo 9700DD filling the same niche, that those already produced would be the last. The most recent delivery of a Panorama had been in 2021, with a total of 80 produced since 2018.

== Previous version ==
The Panorama name was previously used on a coach body manufactured by Plaxton from 1958 until 1970. It was succeeded by the Plaxton Panorama Elite.
