= Buckingham Palace Road =

Street in Belgravia, London

Coordinates: 51.4950°N 0.1459°W

- A3214
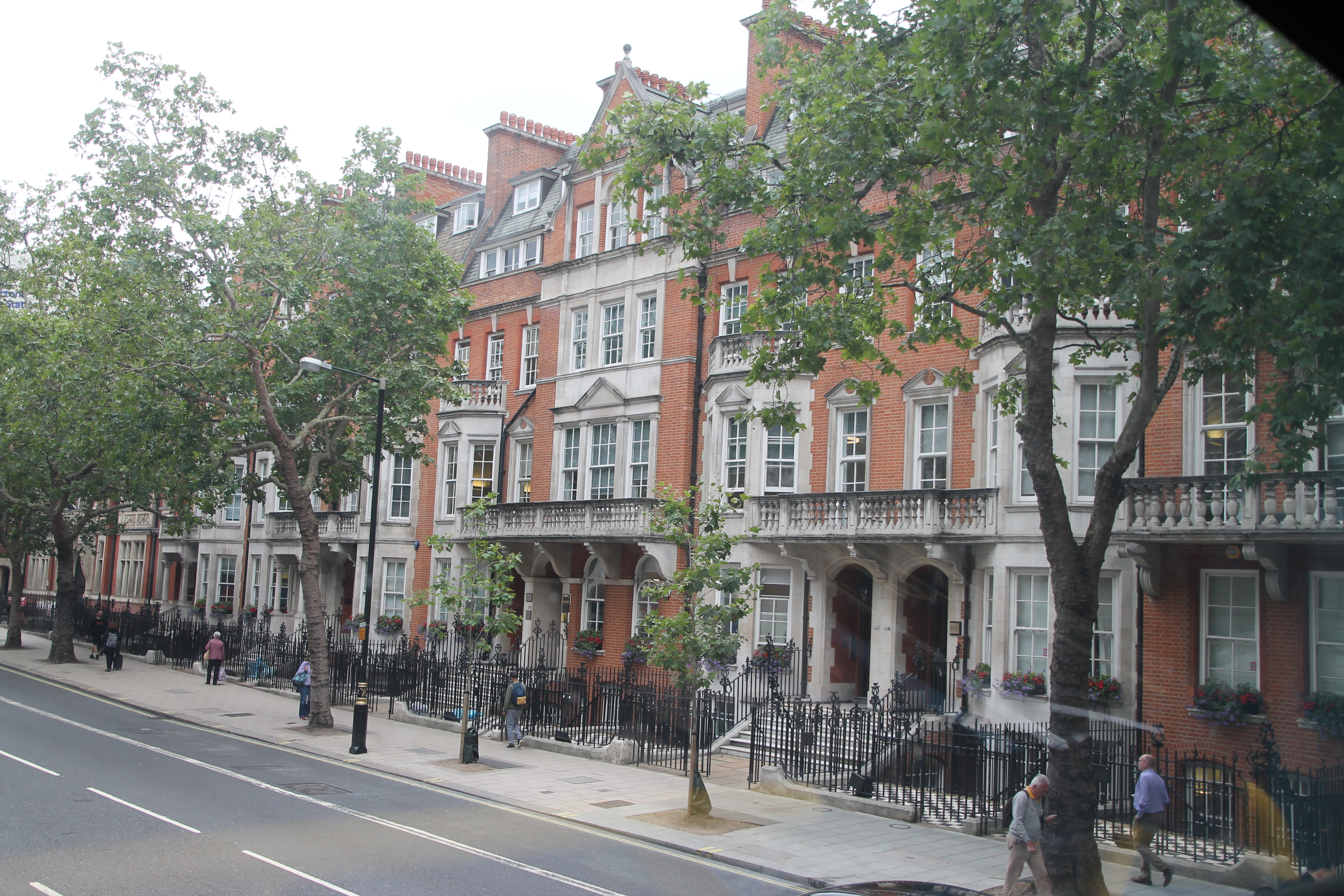
- Buckingham Palace Road, opposite Victoria Station, 2019
- Interactive map of Buckingham Palace Road
- Former name: Chelsea Road (18th century)
- Location: London, England
- Postal code: SW1
- Nearest train station: Victoria
- Northeast end: Birdcage Walk
- Southwest end: Ebury Bridge Road

Buckingham Palace Road is a street that runs through Victoria, London, from the south side of Buckingham Palace towards Chelsea, forming the A3214 road. It is dominated by Victoria Station.

== History ==
In the 18th century, the road was known as Chelsea Road and was often frequented by highwaymen. A reward of £10 was offered in 1752 for the capture of one of the worst offenders. Towards the southern end, Victoria Station was opened in 1866 and the adjacent Victoria Coach Station was built in 1932 in the Art Deco style. From 1890 to 1956 the street had a parish church in the form of St Philip's Church, Buckingham Palace Road.

== Landmarks ==
=== Airways House ===
On 5 June 1939, the Empire Terminal of Imperial Airways opened to the public opposite the coach station, designed by Albert Lakeman, also in the Art Deco style. It features a sculpture Speed Wings over the World, by sculptor Eric Broadbent. It allowed passengers to check-in before boarding special trains from Victoria Station to Croydon Airport or Southampton Docks for the flying boat service. The terminal continued in service until the end of the 1970s, by which time there were dedicated rail or bus connections to Gatwick and Heathrow Airports. It is now the headquarters of the National Audit Office.

=== Royal Mews, King's Gallery ===
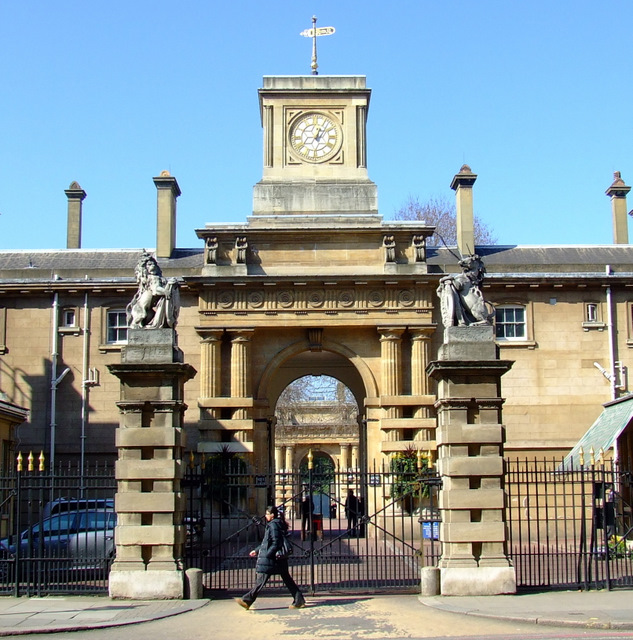
Entrance to the Royal Mews

The entrances to the Royal Mews and King's Gallery are in Buckingham Palace Road.

=== Scouts and Girl Guides ===
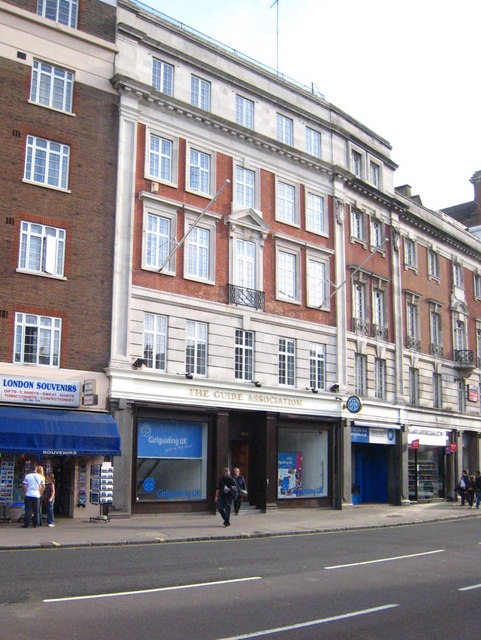
Girlguiding, 17–19 Buckingham Palace Road

In June 1917, the Imperial Headquarters of the Boy Scouts' Association (since 1967, The Scout Association) moved to 25 Buckingham Palace Road from its previous office at 116 Victoria Street. It was in that building that the Boy Scouts' International Bureau (now the World Scout Bureau) was inaugurated in 1920. The UK Scout Headquarters remained at that address until December 1974, when it moved to Baden-Powell House.

The Girl Guides Association (now Girlguiding) rented offices within Scout Headquarters until 1929, when there was no longer storage space for the Association's records. Following a national fundraising campaign called "Save Our Stuff", the Guides were able to move into their own purpose-built headquarters at 17–19 Buckingham Palace Road, which they still occupy today.

== Gallery ==
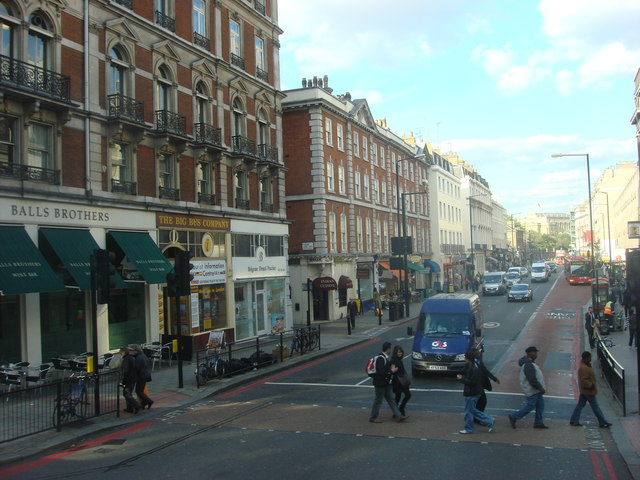
50 Buckingham Palace Road on the left

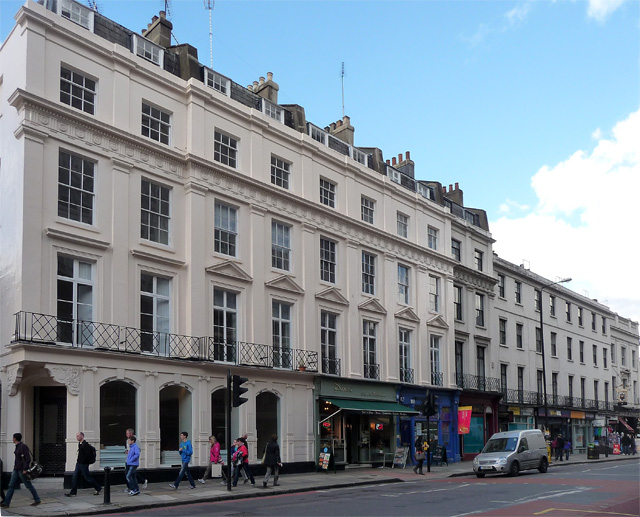
8–24 Buckingham Palace Road

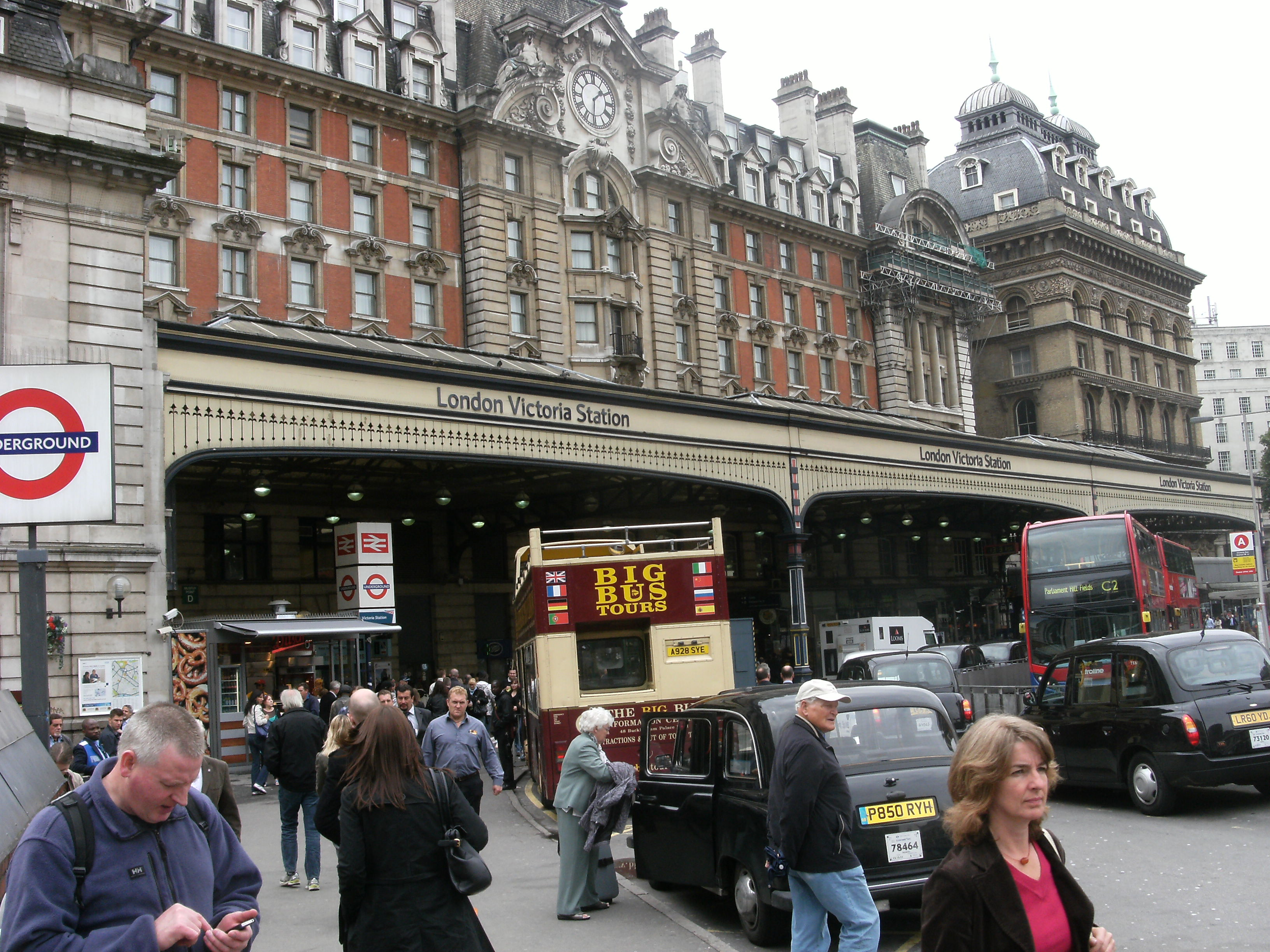
Victoria Station

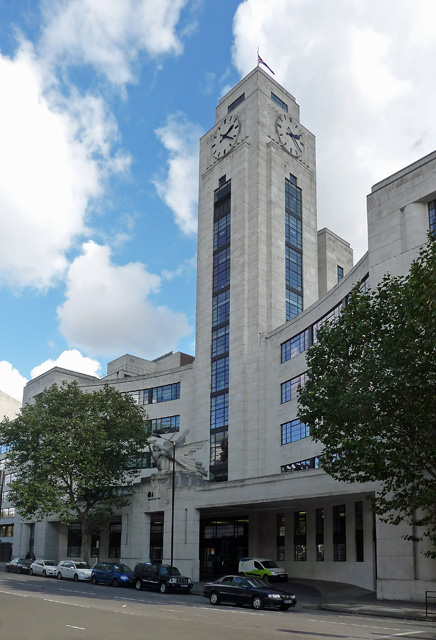
157-167 Buckingham Palace Road, originally the Imperial Airways Empire Terminal

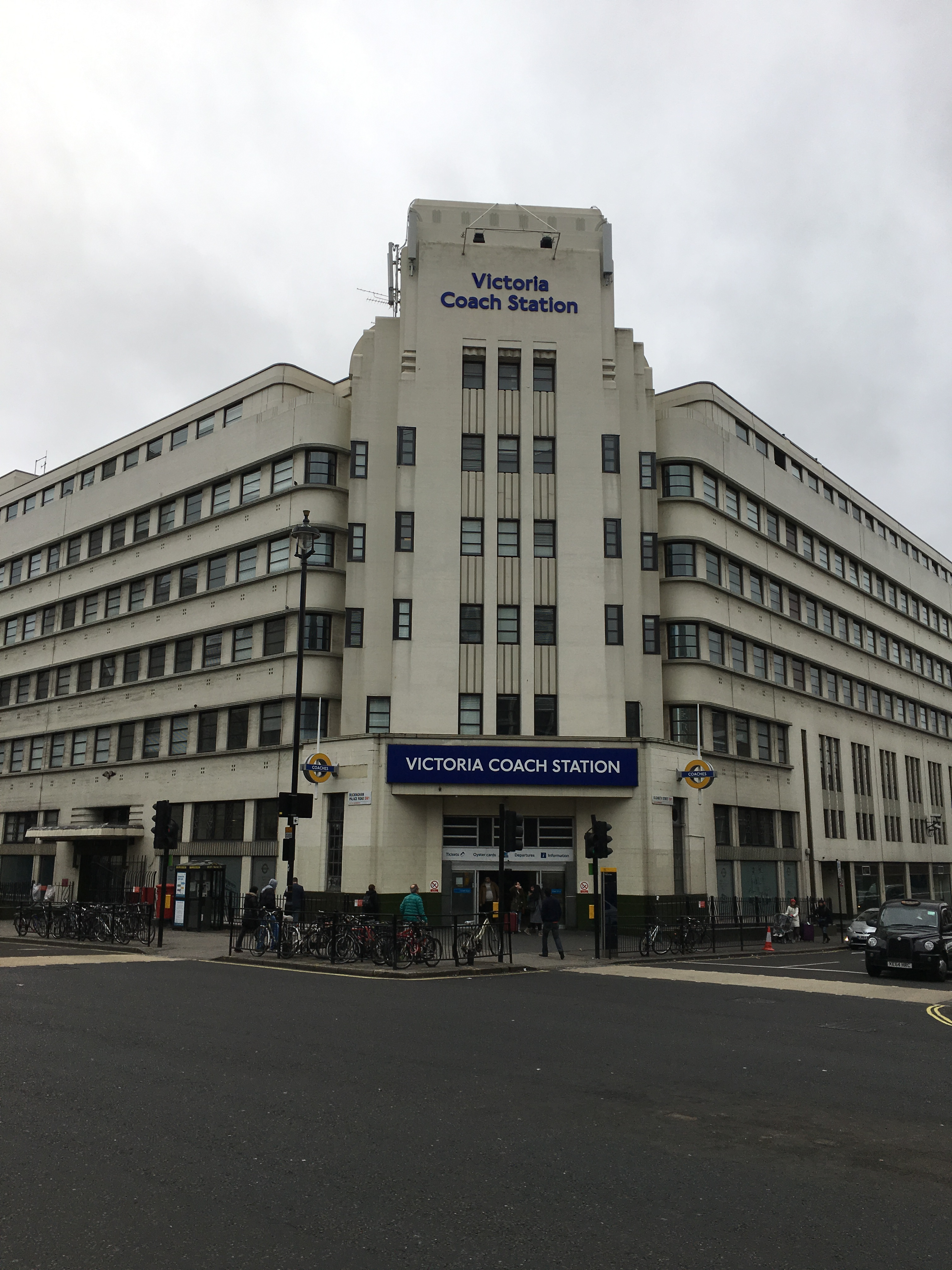
Victoria Coach Station

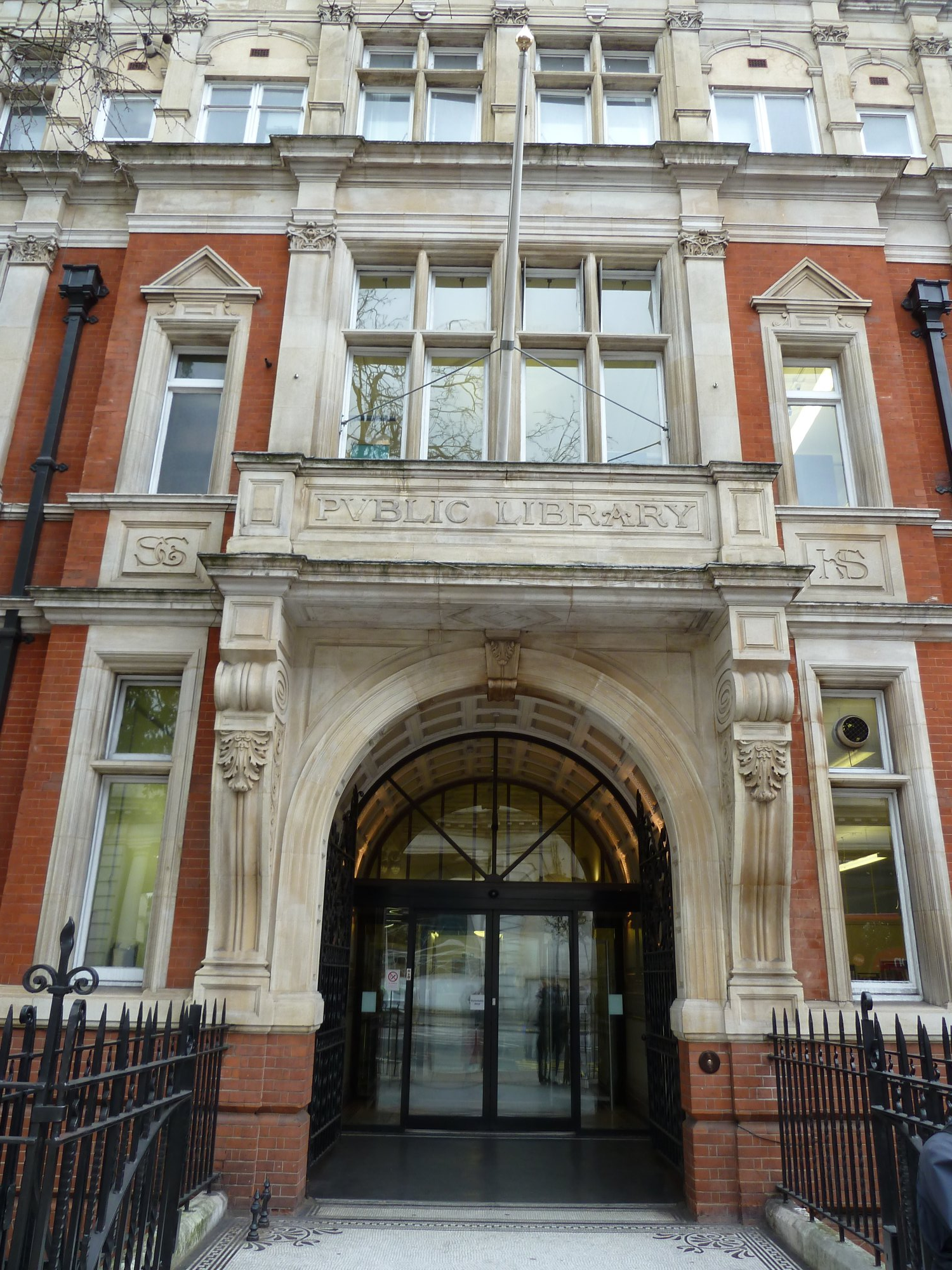
The Victoria Public Library, opened in 1894
