= Victoria Coach Station =

Coach station in London, England

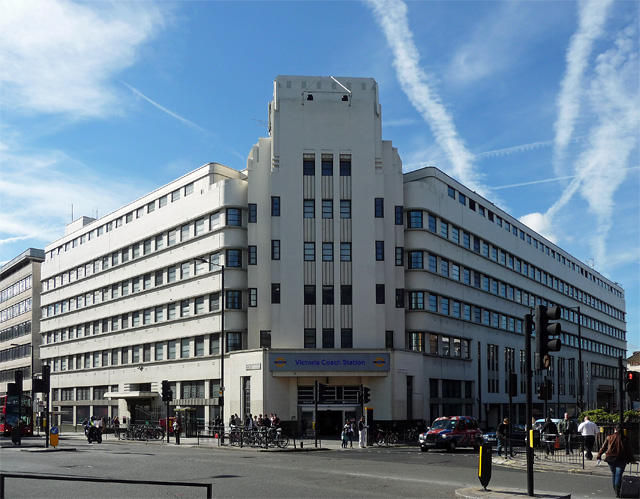
- Victoria Coach Station, 2012

General information
- Location: Buckingham Palace Road; Victoria, London, SW1; England
- Coordinates: 51.4931°N 0.1486°W
- Operator: Transport for London
- Bus stands: 22
- Bus operators: 15
- Connections: Victoria

Other information
- Website: https://tfl.gov.uk/modes/coaches/victoria-coach-station

History
- Opened: 10 March 1932; 94 years ago

Passengers
- 14 million (2016 / 2017)
- Rank

Listed Building – Grade II
- Official name: Victoria Coach Station
- Designated: 1 September 2014
- Reference no.: 1418262
Location
- Location within Central London

Victoria Coach Station in the City of Westminster is the largest coach station in London, and a terminus for medium and long distance coach services in the United Kingdom. It is operated by Victoria Coach Station Limited, a subsidiary of Transport for London. As of 2017, there were 14 million passenger and 472,000 coach movements annually.

Victoria Coach Station covers 3.3 acres (13,000 m^{2}) with separate arrival and departure terminals on opposite sides of Elizabeth Street. The departure building includes food and retail outlets, left-luggage facilities and a ticket hall.

London Buses routes 11, 44, 170, C1, C10, N11 and N44 serve the coach station. It is a short walk from London Victoria station.

== History ==
Victoria Coach Station was commissioned by London Coastal Coaches, a consortium of coach operators, and opened on 10 March 1932 by Minister of Transport John Pybus. Wallis, Gilbert and Partners' distinctive Art Deco building was originally built with spaces for 76 coaches, and a booking hall, shops, buffet, restaurant, lounge and bar. London Coastal Coaches' headquarters and other offices occupied upper floors.

During World War II coach travel was restricted and the War Office requisitioned the premises.

By the 1960s, operation of the station had passed through industry consolidation to Tilling Group and British Electric Traction, whence it was reorganised by the Transport Act 1968 to become part of National Bus Company. Subsequently it was transferred to London Transport in 1988, and Transport for London (TfL) in 2000.

Freehold owner, Grosvenor Group, announced in 2013 that it wished to redevelop the site and relocate station operations elsewhere in London, though the following year English Heritage designated the building Grade II listed. Nevertheless, several of TfL's leases on the station were due to expire by 2023 and proposals were made to relocate to Royal Oak, but in 2019 the move was abandoned.

== Utilisation ==
Use of the coach station has increased from 2008 to 2018.

	Passengers - million	Coaches - thousand
2021 / 2022	11	118
2020 / 2021	2	40
2019 / 2020	13.2	440
2018 / 2019	12.5	450
2017 / 2018	14	472
2016 / 2017	14.5	476
2015 / 2016	14.5	466
2014 / 2015	14	460
2013 / 2014	14	480
2012 / 2013	11	438
2011 / 2012	10.5	413
2010 / 2011	10.3	399
2009 / 2010	11.8	389
2008 / 2009	9.5	394

Data from 2008/2009 until 2019/2020 is for departing passengers only and both departing and arriving coaches.

Data from 2020/21 onwards is 'passenger movements through the site' and 'Domestic and International Accessible Departures'. TfL does not state a reason for the reporting being different.

== Operators ==
As of 2023, service operators include:

Operator	Image	Routes operated
BlaBlaBus		Lille and Paris Brussels, Rotterdam and Amsterdam
Flixbus
Flixbus		Various international & domestic routes
National Express		Various domestic routes
Sindbad Coaches		Various destinations in Poland

== Financial ==
Profits for TfL subsidiary Victoria Coach Station Ltd have increased over recent years.

	Revenue - million	Profit - thousand
2017 / 2018	£9.9	£1,300
2016 / 2017	£10.0	£1,200
2015 / 2016	£9.5	£494
2014 / 2015	£9.2	£123
2013 / 2014	£8.9	£654
2012 / 2013	£8.6	£419
2011 / 2012	£8.4	£727

== Controversy ==
In 2019, Transport for London was served a Fire Enforcement Notice after a "catalogue of major fire risks" were found by London Fire Brigade inspectors at Victoria Coach Station.

The deficiencies included holes in walls, which could cause a fire to spread; inadequate fire sprinkler systems that had been broken and out of use for more than two years, and obstructed exit routes used for storage. Fire experts described the situation as a "walking disaster area" and "by far the worst I've seen in a long time". Transport for London posted fire watchers.
