= Racial segregation in the United Kingdom =

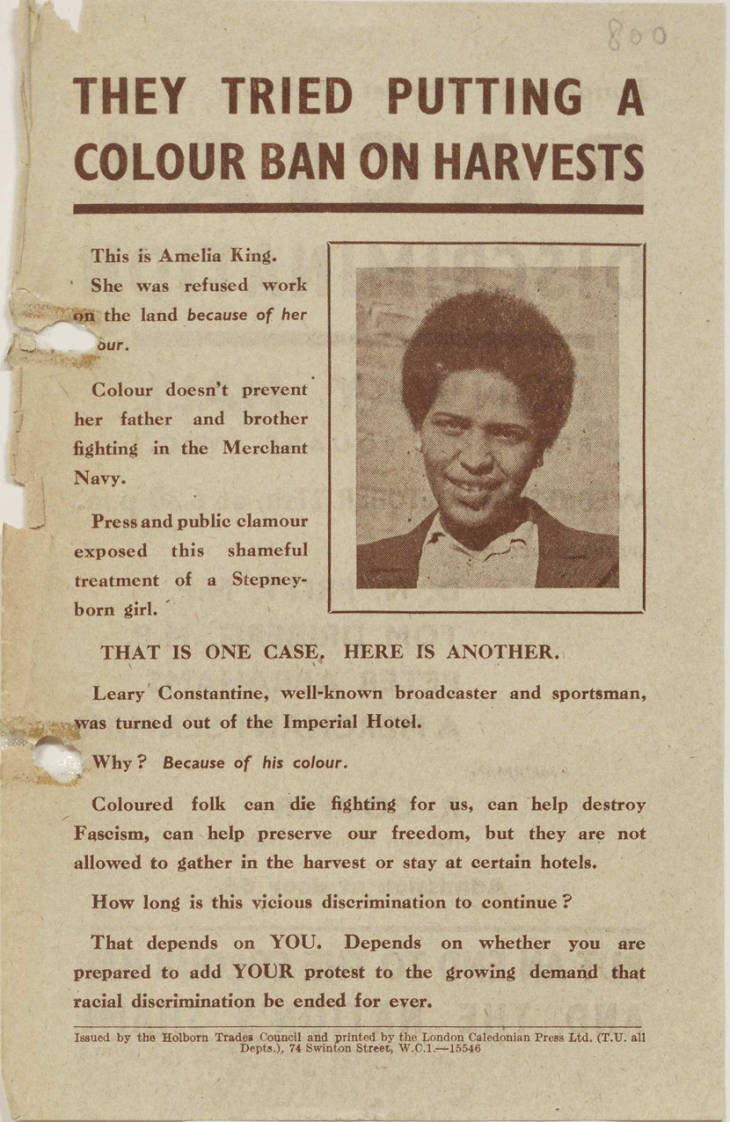
Rear face of a Holborn Trades Council leaflet promoting a 1943 anti-discrimination meeting, and citing the cases of Amelia King and Learie Constantine (transcription)

In the United Kingdom, racial segregation occurred in pubs, workplaces, shops and other commercial premises, which operated a colour bar where non-white customers were banned from using certain rooms and facilities. Segregation also operated in the 20th century in certain professions, in housing and at Buckingham Palace. There were no British laws requiring racial segregation, but until 1965, there were no laws prohibiting racial segregation either.

The colour bar, according to author Sathnam Sanghera, was an import from the British Empire, where people living under British rule would be segregated depending on their race and colour.

The colour bar in pubs was deemed illegal by the Race Relations Act 1965, but other institutions such as members' clubs could still bar people because of their race until a few years later. Some resisted the law such as in the Dartmouth Arms in Forest Hill or the George in Lambeth which still refused to serve non-white people.

== World War II ==
During World War II, thousands of African Americans serving in the United States Armed Forces were stationed in the United Kingdom. As the US military was racially segregated, Black American troops in Britain were segregated from their white counterparts and ordered to not visit various public facilities such as pubs and nightclubs. In response to demands from senior American commanders, an informal system of segregation was implemented in Britain with regards to U.S. military personnel; in some public facilities, certain nights were designated as only for white US servicemen, and on other nights as only for Black Americans. A number of British pubs refused to comply with the US military's segregation demands, such as those in Bamber Bridge, Lancashire, which resulted in the "Battle of Bamber Bridge". Some Black members of the Home Guard were also reportedly refused entry to public facilities even while in uniform. Official sources and testimony, however, record that although UK establishments and politicians were strongly encouraged to enforce segregation, and were keen to co-operate with their American allies, the concept was unacceptable enough that the best compromise was to allow the US forces to segregate their own sleeping areas (but not eating or recreational facilities, which could not be agreed to), on the basis that segregation was a cultural difference that the USA was entitled to maintain.

Although the British Armed Forces, in which thousands of Black people served, was not segregated during the war, General Robert Gordon-Finlayson introduced an Army Council policy in 1939 which only permitted individuals of wholly European descent to serve as commissioned officers in the Army. In 1939, Charles Arundel Moody attempted to join the British Army as an officer but was refused at Whitehall due to the policy. In response, his father Harold Moody mobilised the League of Coloured Peoples, the International African Service Bureau and the West African Students Union to campaign against the policy, which resulted in Charles being allowed to serve as a British Army officer, ending his career as a lieutenant colonel in The Jamaica Regiment.

In October 1942, the Churchill war ministry discussed racial segregation in Britain after Lord Cranbourne noted that a Black official in the Colonial Office had been refused service by a restaurant due to American officers imposing a "whites-only" policy there. Prime Minister Winston Churchill responded by saying "that's alright; if he takes a banjo with him, they'll think he's one of the band", and the ministry concluded that the US military "must not expect our authorities, civil or military, to assist them in enforcing a policy of segregation. It was clear that, so far as concerned admission to canteens, public houses, theatres, cinemas, and so forth, there would, and must, be no restriction of the facilities hitherto extended to coloured persons as a result of the arrival of United States troops in this country". In 1943, Amelia King was not allowed to join the Women's Land Army due to her being Black. The decision was overturned after being raised in the House of Commons by her MP, Stoker Edwards.

== The employment colour bar ==
Many people were denied employment in 20th-century Britain due to racism. For instance, in 1975, in Liverpool, only 20 percent of black people were successful in finding a job. Institutions such as transportation companies, royal palaces and private businesses once operated policies of excluding people from employment based on their race.

=== British Rail ===
The Euston colour bar was brought to light in 1966 by Dominica-born Asquith Xavier who was refused a job as a guard by British Rail, after receiving a letter telling him that he had been rejected for a job at Euston because there was a "ban on coloured men". He later became the first non-white train guard at Euston railway station. Trevor Phillips, when chairman of the Commission for Racial Equality, said in 2006: "Asquith's stand against discrimination brought to light the inadequacy of early race discrimination laws and persistent widespread discrimination faced by ethnic minorities." A plaque at the station commemorates his achievement.

In 1956, the BBC current affairs series Panorama focused on the colour bar on the railway featuring interviews at Smithfield depot. A manager defended a policy of not employing non-white workers.

=== Buckingham Palace ===
Non-white people were banned from clerical roles at Buckingham Palace until at least the latter part of the 1960s. In 1968, the Queen’s chief financial manager, Charles Tryon, 2nd Baron Tryon, sought to secure an exemption from proposed provisions of the Race Relations Act. He stated that it was policy to only employ people of colour as domestic servants at the Palace.

When the Act passed it included an exemption specified that if a member of Palace staff complained about racial discrimination then the case would be heard by the Home Secretary rather than the law courts. This exemption still applies today.

The date the colour bar at Buckingham Palace ended is not clear but records show that people of colour have been employed since the 1990s.

=== Bristol Omnibus Company ===
A four-month boycott of the city's bus services occurred in 1963 when the Bristol Omnibus Company refused to employ non-white crews. Campaigners included Paul Stephenson, Roy Hackett, Owen Henry, Audley Evans and Prince Brown.

=== Manchester Transportation Department ===
A fixed quota of non-white bus drivers and conductors was reported to the Manchester and District Council for African Affairs in 1954 despite a shortage of employees in those positions.

=== West Bromwich Corporation Transport ===
In 1955, Bhikai Patel, who had been a tram conductor in Mumbai, was employed as a bus conductor by West Bromwich Corporation. All the Corporation's drivers and conductors (except one, Arthur Horton), voted to strike against his employment, following an unsuccessful similar attempt to veto immigrant workers on Birmingham Transport shortly before. Although they denied they were operating a colour bar, leaders told their local TGWU secretary that they believed that "if one coloured man was allowed to work a flood of them would follow." The TGWU did not support the strike, and following condemnation from the council, local clergy and newspapers, it was called off within two weeks. Nevertheless, the action prompted a similar strike in Wolverhampton later that year, supported by far-right groups such as the Birmingham Nationalist Club.

=== Walter Slingsby and Co ===
In 1961 white workers at an engineering firm in Keighley, West Yorkshire, went on strike after two men of Pakistani origin were employed. They returned to work when the management introduced a colour bar by agreeing that only white workers would be employed in skilled jobs.

=== Hair salons ===
Hilary Alderson worked in a Co-operative hairdressers salon in Leeds, West Yorkshire, in the late 1950s where her manager, a Mr Raymond, would not employ people of colour as hairdressers. When the workers protested the salon manager told Alderson that the salon's customers would object if he did employ non-white hairdressers. Barber's shops were also common sites of informal colour bars.

=== Barnbow ===
In the munitions factory near Leeds that made tanks, Alford Gardner was repeatedly turned down for work in the late 1940s because he was not allowed to join the company's union. A labour officer at Barnbow eventually revealed there was a colour bar which meant Jamaica-born Gardner could not be employed.

== Education ==
In the 1960s, following concerns about segregation within the education system, Asian children were "bussed" to predominantly white suburban schools to promote integration. In the 1970s, Bernard Coard wrote How the West Indian Child is Made Educationally Sub-normal in the British School System, exposing the segregation of students from the British Afro-Caribbean community into "educationally subnormal" schools.

== Immigration ==
Various pieces of legislation in the 1950s and 1960s sought to ban non-whites migrating to the UK, with The Economist describing Labour's 1968 Commonwealth Immigration Act (premiership of Harold Wilson) as "restricting the entry of many holders of British passports, simply and solely because they are brown".

== Housing ==
Across the country, non-white citizens were barred from rental properties by a number of landlords and landladies because of their colour. The Bishop of Portsmouth spoke out about the practice in 1958, and it was common for properties to be advertised for Europeans only. In Aberdeen, 50 per cent of student accommodation advertisements in 1954 barred people who were described as colonials.

New town development in the postwar period was implicated in the racial segregation of the population.

== Public houses ==
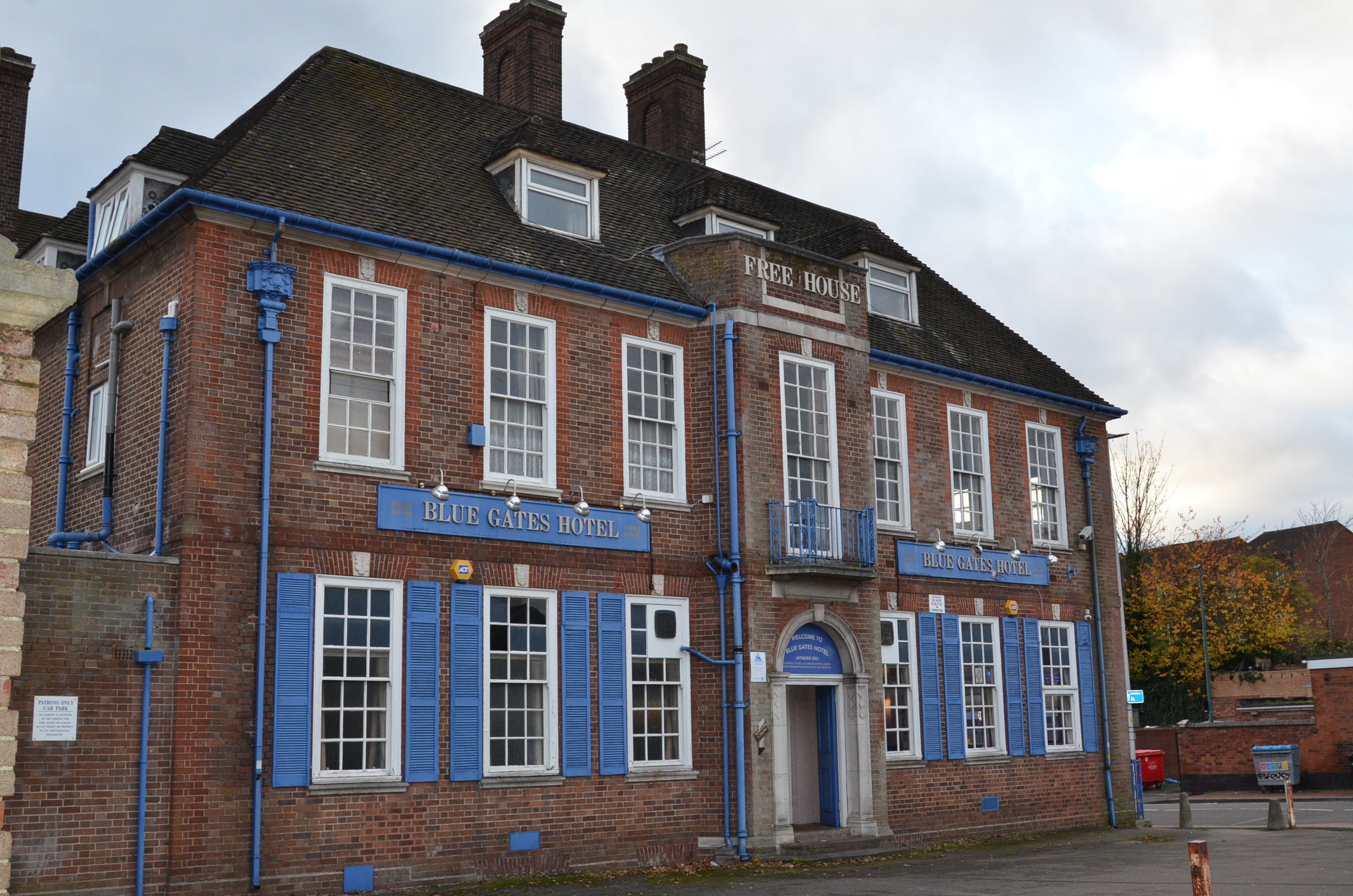
In 1965, Malcolm X visited the Blue Gates pub in Smethwick, which operated a colour bar

The colour bar operated around the UK until the law prohibited the discrimination of customers based on their race, colour or country of birth. It meant that landlords could split public houses into white areas and "coloured" rooms. The publicans defended their actions by claiming it was a "poverty bar" but there's evidence that teachers and doctors of colour were banned from their "white rooms" It took co-ordinated action to break the colour bar in pubs, with anti-racism activists peacefully protesting against discrimination. Malcolm X even visited Smethwick to see how bad the racism was.

=== London ===
The mayor of Lewisham was tipped off about a colour bar that operated in the Dartmouth Arms in Forest Hill and visited the pub in January 1965 with Melbourne Goode of the Brockley International Friendship Association. He was refused service by the landlord Harold Hawes, who still refused to change his racist policy despite anti-racists staging a sit-in at the pub. In Brixton, men from the West Indies were barred from attending local dance clubs in Brixton and Streatham without a partner and many pubs operated a colour bar where "there was a large coloured population in Brixton and Jamaicans were not popular in the public houses". The George in Brixton operated a colour bar, with the landlord saying: "I am making sure the blacks don't take over this area." A judge ruled that protestors were not threatening staff, and that the colour bar was in operation.

=== Bristol ===
The Bay Horse pub in 1964 refused to serve Paul Stephenson, who had a West African father and mixed-heritage mother. After refusing to leave the premises, Stephenson was eventually arrested by eight members of police. He was held overnight, and his subsequent trial became national news.

=== East Anglia ===
The publican of the Tickell Arms in Whittlesford, Cambridgeshire, was reported to the Race Relations Board in 1969 for refusing to serve a Trinidadian who was with a white girl.

=== The Midlands ===
Smethwick was a key battleground for anti-racism campaigners breaking the colour bar that operated in the town's pubs run by Mitchells and Butlers brewery. The campaign was run by the Indian Workers Association and one of its members Avtar Singh Jouhl introduced Malcolm X to one of the town's pubs, the Blue Gates. Other Smethwick pubs and clubs, including the Red Cow Hotel and the CIU-affiliated Labour Club were among many others operating colour bars.

In 1969, a Wolverhampton pub denied entry to Abe Tapper, of Indian origin, when he wanted to use the Ash Tree's telephone.

In 1983, a West Bromwich wine bar banned Sikh youth leader Dal Singh from entering the premises because he was wearing a turban.

=== The North ===
Manchester police were called to the Old Abbey Taphouse pub on the Greenheys estate between Hulme and Moss Side on 30 September 1953, and black boxer Len Johnson and his friends were all thrown out after being refused service because of the colour of his skin. Johnson was angered by this and enlisted the help of the then Lord Mayor of Manchester, and the Bishop of Manchester; more than 200 people took part in a demonstration outside. In 1954, two Manchester publicans lost their licences for operating a colour bar in the Whitworth Hotel and the Paragon Inn after they refused to serve Samuel Edoo, a Manchester University graduate.

== Hotels ==
Proprietors would often eject or ban black and Asian members of the public that wanted rooms. The most famous case was of the West Indian cricketer, Learie Constantine, who in 1943 was told to leave the Imperial Hotel in Russell Square, London, and successfully sued the proprietors for breach of contract. In 1937, the Scottish Heavyweight boxer, Manuel Abrew, nearly cancelled his fight with Jack London in London after being turned away from four hotels in the city and one in Windsor where he was told to find a boarding house instead. Other sportspeople who suffered from the hotel colour bar include the entire Indian table tennis team in 1935 causing the organisers of the 1935 World Table Tennis Championships to force the owners of a London hotel to change their mind by threatening to remove all competitors from the premises.

A colour bar operated throughout the UK and well into the 1980s; for example a Scottish hotel tried to ban two brothers, Omar and David Dafalla, from a disco in March 1986 after they had admitted their white mother.

== Restaurants ==
In Edinburgh a colour bar was in place in some restaurants and dancehalls during the 1920s, which banned Indian students.

== Entertainment venues ==
George Roberts, aged 31, was refused entry twice to a Liverpool dance hall in 1944 because of his colour; once in civilian clothes and then when he returned in his Home Guard uniform. He was taken to court because after the racist incident he refused to go on Home Guard parades claiming he was being insulted while wearing the uniform. The West Indian cricketer Learie Constantine gave evidence on his behalf. In 1954, Constantine published a book titled Colour Bar (1954), which addressed race relations in Britain and the racism he had experienced.

In 1958, Wolverhampton's Scala dance hall made national news when the owner refused entry to Udit Kumar Das Gupta on the grounds of race. His complaint to the council found support from local MP John Baird and the Musicians Union, who blacklisted the club - the Union's first intervention into racial politics in post-war Britain. The jazz musician Johnny Dankworth sued one newspaper for the suggestion that he broke the picket, and donated the proceeds of the case to his charity, the Stars Campaign For Inter-Racial Friendship.

In 2022, black out performances came to the UK. A concept originated by Jeremy O. Harris, these showings are designed to "create a space for as many Black-identifying audience members as possible" for select events. The tickets were primarily to black-majority or all-black institutions. The performances have occurred with three plays in the UK as of 2024: Daddy at the Almeida Theatre in 2022, Tambo & Bones at the Theatre Royal Stratford East in 2023, and Slave Play at Noël Coward Theatre in 2024.

== Sports ==
=== Boxing ===
Non-white boxers, like Len Johnson, were barred from competition from 1911 until 1948. Due to then Home Secretary Winston Churchill's decision in 1911 to support a colour bar, Johnson was banned from competing at both the Royal Albert Hall and National Sporting Club. The British Boxing Board of Control argued that boxers in that period could compete for Empire titles but it did bar boxers who were 'not of pure European descent'.

=== Cricket ===
Cricket clubs with players from black or Asian origin have a long history of not being allowed to compete in cricket leagues, such as Queen's Road Muslims cricket club being excluded from the Halifax cricket league.

=== Football ===
Crawley Town manager John Yems left his position at the club after being accused of racism and segregation. It was alleged in 2022 that he racially segregated the dressing-room, telling white footballers to avoid getting changed with the black members of the team. Ultimately, an independent regulatory commission ruled that the allegations of segregation could not be proven and should be dropped. However, Yems was found guilty of 11 instances of using racially discriminatory language and was banned from all football-related activities until January 2026.

== See also ==
- Anti-Catholicism in the United Kingdom
- Antisemitism in the United Kingdom
- Racism in the United Kingdom
- Segregation in Northern Ireland
