= Guy Reid-Bailey =

British civil rights activist

Guy Reid-Bailey, born 1945, was a leading campaigner for black civil rights in Bristol and one of the leading organisers of the Bristol Bus Boycott of 1963. He changed his name from Bailey to Reid-Bailey when he married Erna Reid in 1981.

== Life ==
He arrived in Britain in 1961 from Jamaica aged 16 He applied for a job with Bristol Buses over the phone. He was asked in to the bus company, who felt his name indicated someone who was white British. When he turned up he was refused employment. The then-manager of the Bristol Omnibus Company, Ian Patey told Reid-Bailey that he "couldn’t employ blacks". Bailey told a friend, Paul Stephenson, what had happened and from that came the Bristol Bus Boycott that had a large part to play in the introduction of the 1965 Race Relations Act.

Although Reid-Bailey never worked for the bus company he found success in life working as an engineer and following his love of cricket, helping to found the Bristol West Indies Cricket Club (BWICC) in 1963 still facing racism. He remembered: "one club in Bristol wouldn’t offer us a fixture until we played a trial game to show them we were good enough. We beat them so badly, they had to play us." The club prospered and Reid-Bailey subsequently went on to have is work recognised with an OBE and a portrait by Helen Wilson-Roe, displayed at Lord's Cricket Ground. In 2023 he was appointed vice-president of Gloucestershire Cricket.

He also co-founded the United Housing Association to support Caribbean Elders, the first black housing association in the southwest.

Bristol archives hold a collection of his memorabilia.
