= Asquith Xavier =

First non-white train guard at Euston railway station, England

- Xavier on the platform of Euston railway station on 15 August 1966.
- Born: 18 July 1920; Dominica
- Died: 18 June 1980 (aged 59); Chatham, Kent
- Monuments: Plaque, Euston railway station, London, England
- Known for: First non-white train guard at Euston railway station, England

Asquith Camile Xavier (18 July 1920 – 18 June 1980) was a West Indian-born Briton who ended a colour bar at British Railways in London by fighting to become the first non-white train guard at Euston railway station in 1966. Trevor Phillips, when chairman of the Commission for Racial Equality, said in 2006: "Asquith's stand against discrimination brought to light the inadequacy of early race discrimination laws and persistent widespread discrimination faced by ethnic minorities." A plaque at the station commemorates his achievement.

== Early life ==
Xavier was born on 18 July 1920 in Dominica, which was then a British colony. He was a member of the Windrush generation of British African-Caribbean people who migrated to the United Kingdom after the Second World War to fill vacancies in service industries. He married Agnes Disney St John (1922–2004) in Dominica and they had seven children. He is thought to have worked as a policeman before emigrating with his wife and four of their children, arriving in Southampton on 16 April 1958. Xavier began work as a carriage cleaner and porter at Marylebone station the following day and was promoted to the position of guard in April 1959.

== Discrimination ==
Xavier joined British Railways. In 1966 he was still working as a guard at Marylebone station in central London. He applied for a promotion and transfer to work at Euston station, but was rejected. A letter from a staff committee at Euston—which was dominated by members of the National Union of Railwaymen—explained that it was because of his colour. Unions and management had informally agreed in the 1950s to ban non-white people from jobs at Euston involving contact with the public; they could be cleaners and labourers, but not guards or ticket collectors.

The Race Relations Act 1965 had made discrimination on "grounds of colour, race, or ethnic or national origins" unlawful in public places in Great Britain (but not Northern Ireland). Xavier could not use this legislation to further his case as it did not cover workplaces.

Xavier persisted. A union official from the Marylebone branch publicised the rejection by writing a letter of protest to the head of the National Union of Railwaymen on his behalf. Two members of parliament wrote to the secretary of state for transport, Barbara Castle, to ask her to direct British Railways to end racial discrimination.

On 15 July 1966 British Railways announced that colour bars at stations in London had been abandoned. Xavier was offered the job with his pay backdated to May, the month when he had been originally rejected. Xavier could not take up the job immediately because he was recovering from hospital treatment for an ulcer. He received hate mail and death threats, and asked for police protection. He started work on 15 August 1966.

== Death ==
Xavier died on 18 June 1980 in Chatham, Kent.

== In the media ==
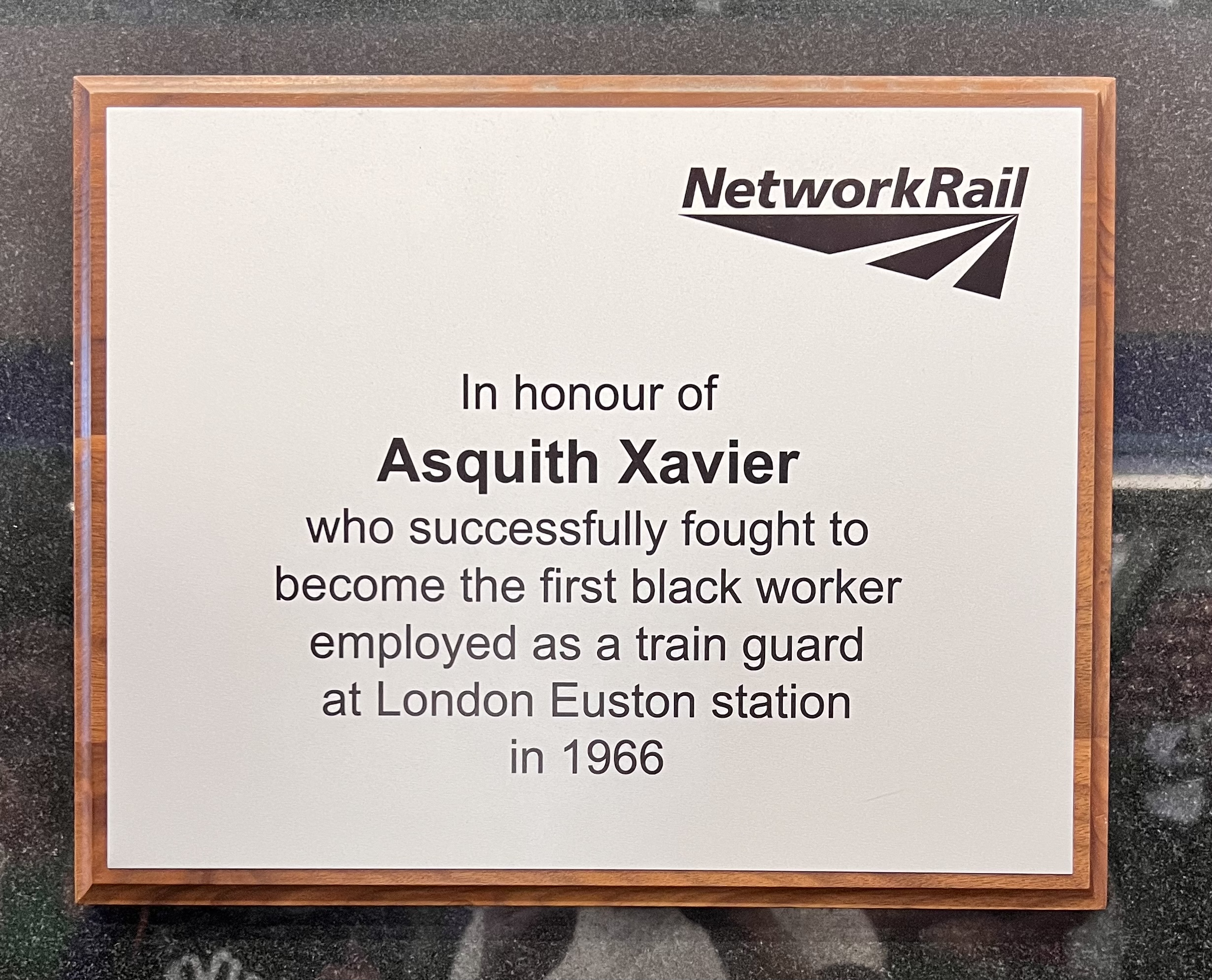
A plaque to commemorate Asquith Xavier at Euston Train Station

Oona King presented a BBC Radio 4 documentary, Asquith's Fight for Equality, about his story in 2016—the fiftieth anniversary of his victory. In the same year, The One Show on BBC One television interviewed Xavier's family and covered the unveiling of the plaque at Euston station that marked his fight.

== Commemoration ==
In September 2020, a second plaque was unveiled in Chatham, his home for many years, in the waiting room of the local station.

A biography of Asquith Xavier was included in the Oxford Dictionary of National Biography in October 2022.

In October 2023, an Avanti West Coast Pendolino train was named after him, the train nameplate also has a depiction of him working as a guard.

In August 2026, a blue plaque was installed at his former Notting Hll house.

== See also ==
- Wilston Samuel Jackson—Britain's first black train driver
- Bristol Bus Boycott—a protest in 1963 against a bus company's refusal to employ non-white bus crews in Bristol.
- Institutional racism
- Race Relations Act 1965—the first legislation in the United Kingdom to address racial discrimination.
- Race Relations Act 1968—an extension to the 1965 act that prohibited racial discrimination in housing, employment and public service.
- Racism in the United Kingdom
- Rosa Parks—an activist in the United States civil rights movement, best known for her pivotal role in the Montgomery bus boycott.
