= Roy Hackett =

British civil rights activist (1928–2022)

Roy Hackett MBE
- Born: Lurel Roy Hackett; 19 September 1928; St Mary, Jamaica
- Died: 2 August 2022 (aged 93); England
- Known for: Civil rights activism

Lurel Roy Hackett MBE (19 September 1928 – 2 August 2022) was a Jamaican-born activist and long-time civil rights campaigner for the British African-Caribbean community in Bristol, England. He was one of the primary organizers of the Bristol Bus Boycott, which protested against the Bristol Omnibus Company's ban on employing black and Asian drivers and conductors. These events then paved the way for the Race Relations Act of 1965, the first legislation in the UK to address racial discrimination. He was also a co-founder of the Commonwealth Co-ordinated Committee (CCC) which set up the St. Paul's Carnival (originally known as the St Paul’s Festival), a major cultural event in Bristol.

He was appointed a Member of the Order of the British Empire (MBE) in the 2020 Birthday Honours for services to the community in Bristol. He was also a member of the Bristol Race Equality Council and founder of West Indian Parents’ and Friends’ Association (WIPFA).

== Early life ==
Hackett grew up in Islington in St Mary, Jamaica, Jamaica. He worked as an insurance broker alongside other jobs, but still struggled to make enough money to eat. In 1952, he travelled to Britain by ship, as part of the Windrush generation, and lived in Liverpool, London and Wolverhampton, before settling in Bristol. Once in Bristol, he faced racism from his first day, as boarding houses refused to give him a room as soon as they saw he was black, and he ended up spending his first night sleeping in a doorway.

== Bus Boycott and anti-racist activism ==
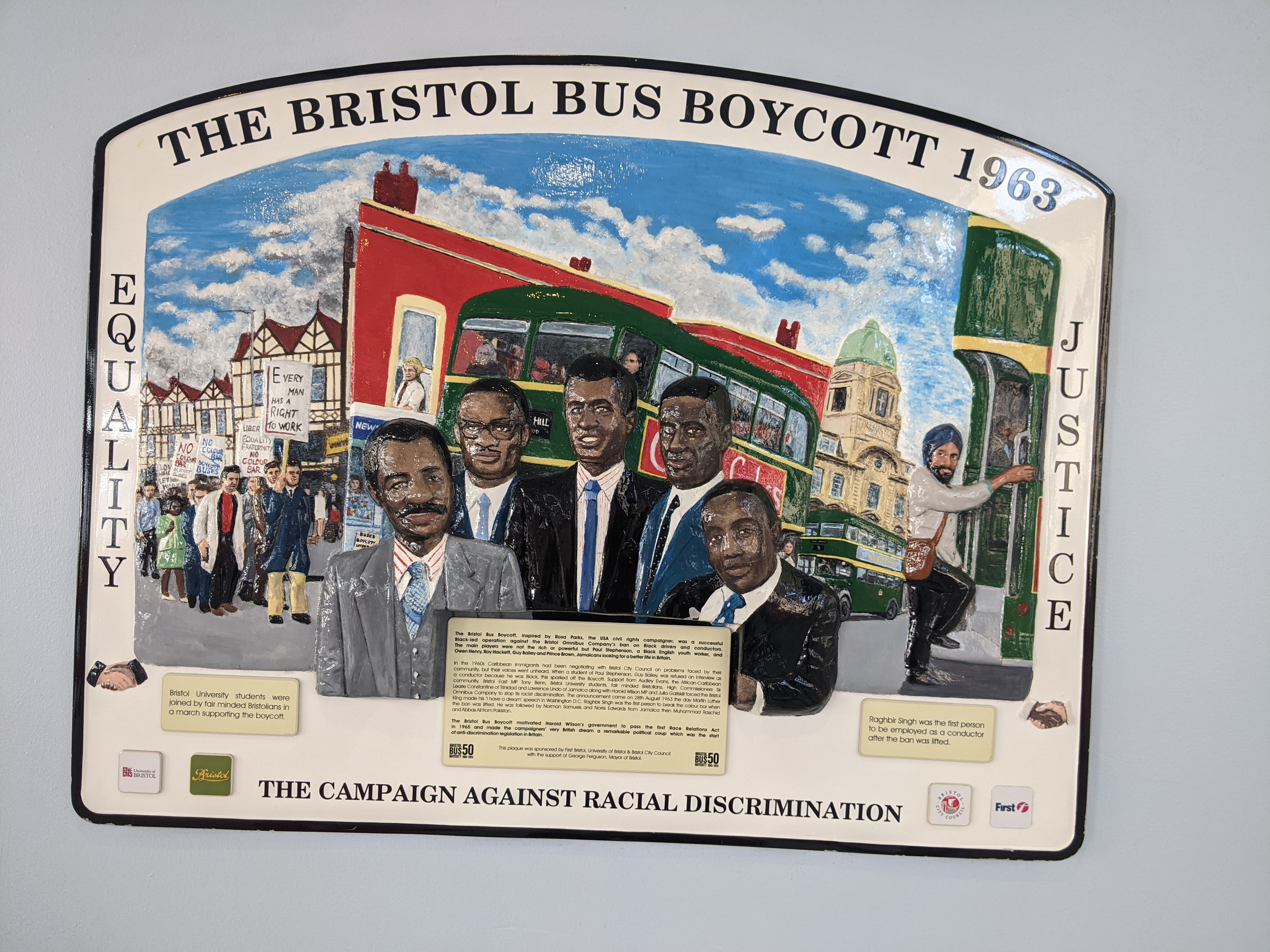
Bristol Bus Boycott plaque

In 1955 the Passenger Group of the Transport and General Workers' Union (TGWU), which represented bus workers, had passed a resolution that black and Asian workers should not be employed as bus crews at the Bristol Omnibus Company, despite a reported labour shortage on the buses. This was revealed by the Bristol Evening Post in 1961 and caused outrage among black communities.

In 1962, Ena Hackett, Roy's wife, applied for a job as a conductor with the bus company, but was rejected despite being fully qualified for the post. Along with Owen Henry, Audley Evans and Prince Brown, Roy Hackett formed an action group to respond to this color bar. Henry introduced Paul Stephenson, who was the city's first black youth officer, to the group, who then became their spokesperson. The group were inspired by Rosa Parks' activism and the Montgomery Bus Boycott, and decided to hold their own Bristol Bus Boycott, which they announced at a press conference on 29 April 1963.

The boycott attracted national attention, with the politician Tony Benn, Labor MP for Bristol South East, committing to staying "off the buses, even if I have to find a bike". The Labor party leader, soon-to-be Prime Minister, Harold Wilson, spoke out against the colour bar at an Anti-Apartheid Movement rally in London in early May. The organizers' strategies included drawing parallels with US segregation and shaming the authorities, while causing as much disruption as possible via pickets of bus depots and routes.

On 28 August, the general manager of the Bristol Omnibus Company, Ian Patey, declared a change in policy, marking success for the bus boycott – the same day that Martin Luther King gave his famous "I Have a Dream" speech in the United States. The evening before, a meeting of 500 TGWU bus workers had voted to agree to "the employment of suitable colored workers as bus crews". Raghbir Singh, became Bristol's first non-white bus conductor on 17 September, followed soon after by two Jamaican and two Pakistani men.

Following the bus boycott, Hackett remained a community leader and a mentor to many in Bristol and continued to work with young people in the community. Also in 1962, Roy Hackett along with Owen Henry and Clifford Drummond established the Commonwealth Coordinated Committee (CCC), with the aims of improving quality of life for people in St Pauls and beyond and promoting integration and equal opportunities. From 1968 to 1979 the CCC set up and ran the St. Paul’s Festival, later named the St. Paul's Carnival, now one of the biggest festivals of its kind in Europe.

Hackett said "I was born an activist" and said he saw it as his duty to challenge racism whenever he saw it.

== Personal life ==
Hackett married his childhood sweetheart Ena in 1959. He had three children. His portrait was painted on a mural in St Pauls, Bristol, as part of an exhibition named Seven Saints of St Paul's, commemorating the Bristol Bus Boycott. As well as receiving an MBE, the Jamaican High Commissioner recognized him for his community service and in 1993 he received Royal Maundy Money from the Queen at Bristol Cathedral. Roy Hackett died at the age of 93 on 2 August 2022. His funeral was a major event in Bristol, with hundreds of guests attending.
