= Amelia King =

British fancy-box maker and Women's Land Army volunteer

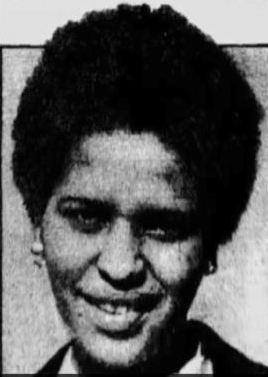
- Born: Amelia Elizabeth King; June 25, 1917; Stepney, London
- Died: 1995 (aged 77–78); Whitechapel, London
- Citizenship: British

Amelia King (25 June 1917 – 1995) was a British woman who was refused entry into the Women's Land Army, during World War II, because she was black. This example of racial segregation in the UK was debated in the House of Commons and was covered in newspapers internationally including The Chicago Defender. The decision would eventually be reversed.

== Early life ==
Amelia Elizabeth King was born in Limehouse in London's East End on 25 June 1917. Her father, Henry King, born in Georgetown, British Guiana, worked as a stoker in the Merchant Navy, and her brother Fitzherbert King served in the Royal Navy. She worked as a fancy box maker before World War II and volunteered to join the Women's Land Army in September 1943.

== Women's Land Army ==
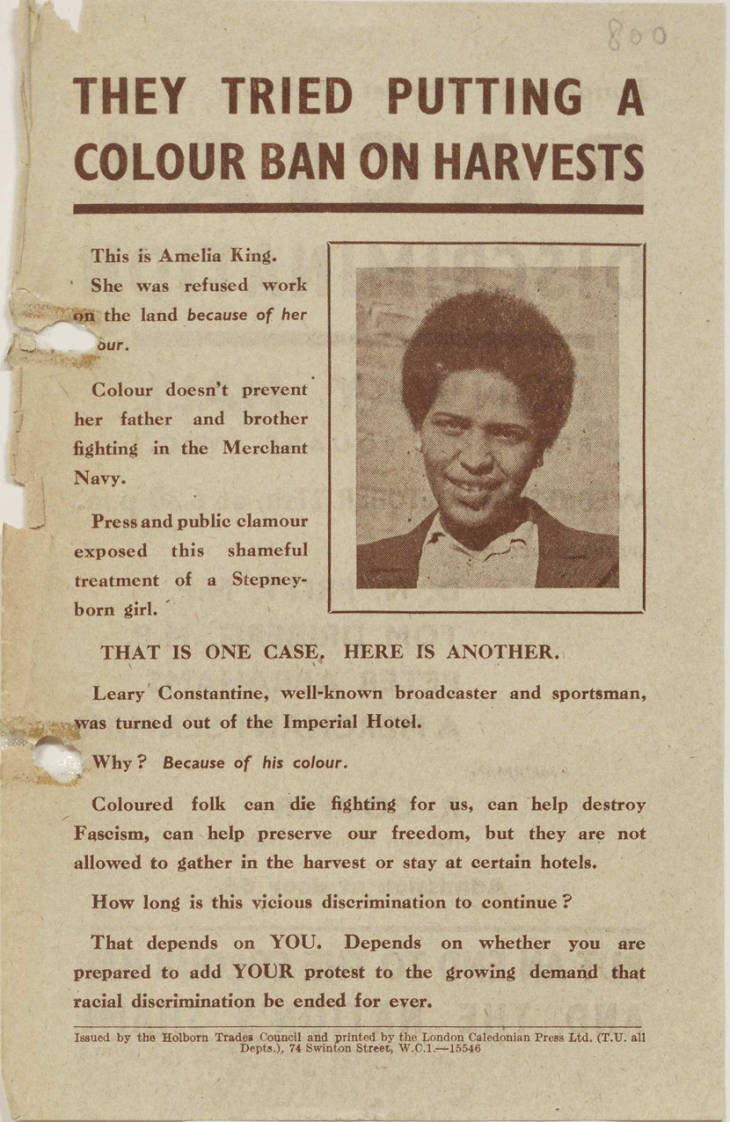
Leaflet for a meeting at Conway Hall to protest racial discrimination, October 1943

King was refused entry to the Land Army by its Essex County branch committee because it was believed it would be difficult to place her, as there would be objections due to her ethnicity. With support from the Holborn Trades Council, King presented the issue to her member of parliament, Walter Edwards, who raised the issue of racism within the Land Army at the House of Commons. This, along with another racially-motivated incident that occurred within the same week in which cricketer Learie Constantine was denied accommodation at a London hotel, attracted widespread controversy and criticism and brought the 'Colour Bar' into focus.

In an interview with George Padmore, published in The Chicago Defender, King reflected "I said to them, if I'm not good enough to work on the land, then I am not good enough to make munitions. No one has ever suggested that my father and brother were not good enough to fight for the freedom of England."

The refusal was reversed and King was able to formally join the Women's Land Army in October 1943. She worked at Frith Farm in Wickham, Hampshire until 1944.

== Later life ==
King died at the Royal London Hospital in Whitechapel in 1995, aged 78.
