= Avtar Singh Jouhl =

British anti-racism campaigner (1937–2022)

Avtar Singh Jouhl OBE
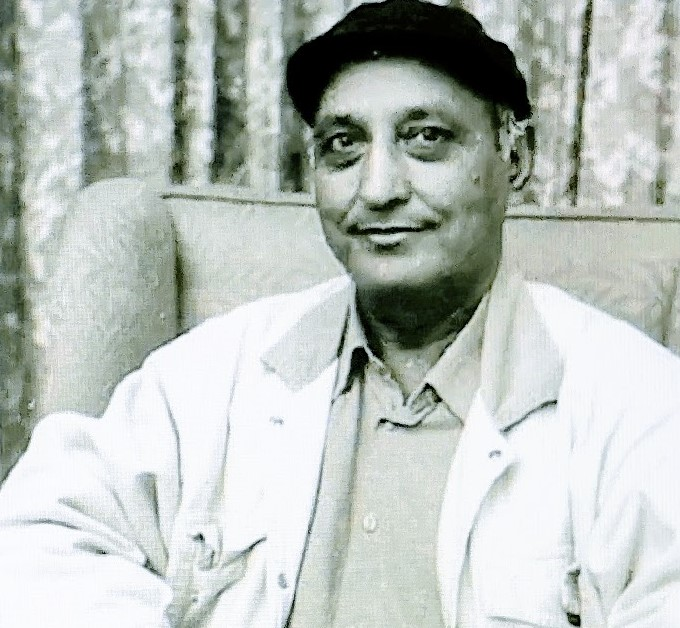
- Born: 2 November 1937; Jandiala, Punjab Province, British India
- Died: 8 October 2022 (aged 84); Birmingham, England
- Occupations: Lecturer and foundry worker
- Organization: Indian Workers' Association
- Known for: Anti-racism campaigning

External videos
- "A short video of Avtar Singh Johal, leader of Indian Workers' Association (IWA)", Stand Up to Racism Birmingham, 30 October 2019.

Avtar Singh Jouhl OBE (2 November 1937 – 8 October 2022) was a British anti-racism campaigner, national president of the Indian Workers' Association (IWA), foundry worker and trade union lecturer.

His work campaigning to end the racial segregation in drinking establishments in Smethwick, West Midlands drew the attention of Malcolm X who visited the town, on 12 February 1965, and was taken to a segregated pub, the Blue Gates, with Jouhl and Indian activists to witness where non-white customers were forced to drink in separate rooms.

Jouhl worked at the Smethwick foundries as a moulder's mate before becoming a shop steward. He was furious to learn he and other South Asian workers were paid less than half their white counterparts for the same dangerous, hot work. He acted as a welfare worker and saw the need for collective action to end the colour bar and to end the use of separate toilets for white and non-white workers in these factories. Jouhl played a role in the 1984–1985 miners' strike by sending six coaches of IWA members to the picket line. He also fought for Indian-born workers to be granted British passports so they would not be deported. A lifelong agitator and communist, Jouhl spent almost thirty years working with the IWA in foundries, campaigning against racism and campaigning for the working class.

== Biography ==
=== Early life and background ===
Avtar Jouhl Singh was born on 2 November 1937 in Jandiala, a village named for a jand tree, within India's Jalandhar district. Jandiala villagers flew the communist red flag and before partition the village was a flourishing multi-faith society that included Sikhs, Hindus, Muslims, and members of the Dalit community. Jouhl came from an agricultural family who donated grains to conferences to support the communist movement. Jouhl had three elder brothers and a sister who all worked on the farm but was the only one to be sent to school, due to the high cost of attending. At primary school, Jouhl learned to read and write as part of an all-boy class of 40 students, who would sit outside on jute mats while learning Urdu.

In high school, Jouhl agitated against school fee increases. Teachers hit Jouhl with a cane after he rebelled against the authorities who would force students to be taken out of school and exploit them by having them harvest locust eggs nearby for profit. Jouhl organised the students to pick the eggs and sell them themselves so that the proceeds would go to the children's education. When they handed over the money raised at the school assembly, it was taken by the teachers and the students were caned. His father also slapped Jouhl for his activities.

Following the partition of India in 1947, life in Jandiala had changed and its Muslim residents began to leave among increasing fears of safety, despite the village elders trying to assure them. After protests were made by villagers over the replacement of the red communist flag by the independent India tri-colour flag, a compromise was met whereby the red flag would be flown alongside the new Indian flag.

Jouhl saw living in Britain and attending the London School of Economics as the way to achieve his dream of being a history lecturer.

=== Personal life and death ===
Jouhl's cousin was jailed in 1941 for involvement in India's pre-independence movement. Prior to his incarceration and while he was eluding capture, the police kept raiding the Jouhl family house in order to find his cousin. Jouhl has stated that his early childhood remembrances involve his parents and other relatives being taken to the police station where they would be questioned and beaten.

His father died in 1954, when Jouhl was 16. That same year, he underwent an arranged marriage to Manjeet (whom he was engaged to when he was nine or 10 years old). They loved one another and Jouhl did not remarry after Manjeet died in 1981 at age 40.

Jouhl identified as Punjabi, Indian, and black and claimed that more Asians need to view themselves in these terms and realise the global anti-racism struggle is their fight too.

Jouhl died from cancer at Queen Elizabeth Hospital Birmingham, on 8 October 2022, at the age of 84.

== Career ==
=== Arrival in Smethwick ===
Jouhl left India for the UK for the economic opportunities he believed it represented and because he had been admitted to the London School of Economics so would be able to achieve his desired future as a history lecturer. He arrived in Heathrow on 4 February 1958, with his wife following three years later. Jouhl met his elder brother at the London house he was staying at for his first night and he was taken to Smethwick the next day. His intention was to study but this decision changed after his arrival in Smethwick. Jouhl and his fellow Indian migrants lived in cramped conditions with sometimes 15–24 tenants living in the same house. He observed how the migrants suffered racism in the workplace and in the street and became committed to helping their cause.

He started work as a moulder's mate at the Shotton Bros factory. It was upon his first visit to a segregated pub, the Wagon and Horses in Smethwick where he discovered that non-white drinkers were not permitted in the assembly room despite the Wagon and Horses being a very large expansive drinking hole with two smoke rooms, one assembly bar and two public bars. When pressed, the flimsy excuse offered by the pub's landlord was that it was on account of Indians speaking in Punjabi which the white clientele would complain about as they didn't like feeling like they were being talked about. Jouhl also claimed that non-white pub goers were given different glasses, ones with handles, to their white counterparts so that they could be clearly distinguished, and avoided.

The colour bar was seen to apply in other settings too. Jouhl visited a barber in Brasshouse Lane in Smethwick but the barber refused to cut his hair due to Jouhl being Indian. Jouhl noticed while working at Shotton Bros. foundry as a moulder's mate that moulders were paid a lot more than the Indian workers (he was paid £7.50 compared with white colleagues wages of about £17). Non-white people were, according to Jouhl, not sold houses by estate agents and the Tory council at the time ruled, incorrectly, that it was only possible to go on the council house register if residents had been Smethwick residents for more than 10 years when this clearly disadvantaged the black and Asian immigrant community who had no such length of living in Smethwick.

Jouhl joined the Indian Workers' Association after finding IWA membership cards in the regular delivery of a box of rationed food supplied to his home by an Indian grocer. Interested to learn more, Jouhl asked the delivery man to bring membership forms next time. Some of the others living in the house were already members and had been to a couple of IWA meetings in Wolverhampton. Jouhl took it upon himself to begin recruiting members alongside Jagmohan Joshi and they organised the Birmingham IWA which had its first meeting in 1958. Looking after the welfare concerns and political issues affecting the Indian immigrant community in Britain was its primary concern, and this included fighting against all forms of discrimination.

In 1961, Jouhl was dismissed by Shotton Bros.

=== Breaking the colour bar ===
White left-wing students worked with IWA workers to challenge the colour bar. Pub crawls with student organisations from universities in Birmingham and Aston were organised. First the white students would order drinks. Later, several Asians would come in to join them and would be refused service. The Asians were sometimes given a pretextual excuse that the room was previously booked. In response, the students would come to their defence and clearly counter the erroneous claims.

This evidence of the blatant racism of the colour bar was then used to oppose the renewal of any publican's license since licensing law prevented any licensee from ever refusing to serve an entire class of people in such a clear cut way. When some of the licenses were not renewed, Jouhl stated that it "got huge publicity in 1963 because up until then racial discrimination was not unlawful so everyone and anyone was free to discriminate." The publicans argued that this was not a colour bar but a poverty bar but Asian teachers and doctors were also barred from these rooms. Jouhl campaigned to make it so that the Labour party and trade unions would support legislation opposing the colour bar and racial discrimination. A result of the campaign was a raised profile and backlash against the campaigners. His comrade Jagmohan Joshi's wife, Shirley Joshi, was an anti racism campaigner herself but was depicted and belittled as a "whore" in the press for having a non-white husband. The continued protests against any licensee's clear use of the colour bar did however begin to have a big impact on the commerce and reputation of the Mitchells and Butlers Brewery who ran much of the pubs in the surrounding area.

David Jesudason said that Jouhl and the IWA broke the workplace's colour bar by "getting some 'big lads' to push aside the guy in charge of the segregated toilets." Jouhl positively invited dismissal from his employers due to his actions as he felt it would be for a "great cause". However, no such dismissal took place which Jouhl put down to his employers being too intimidated by him to do so.

=== Malcolm X ===
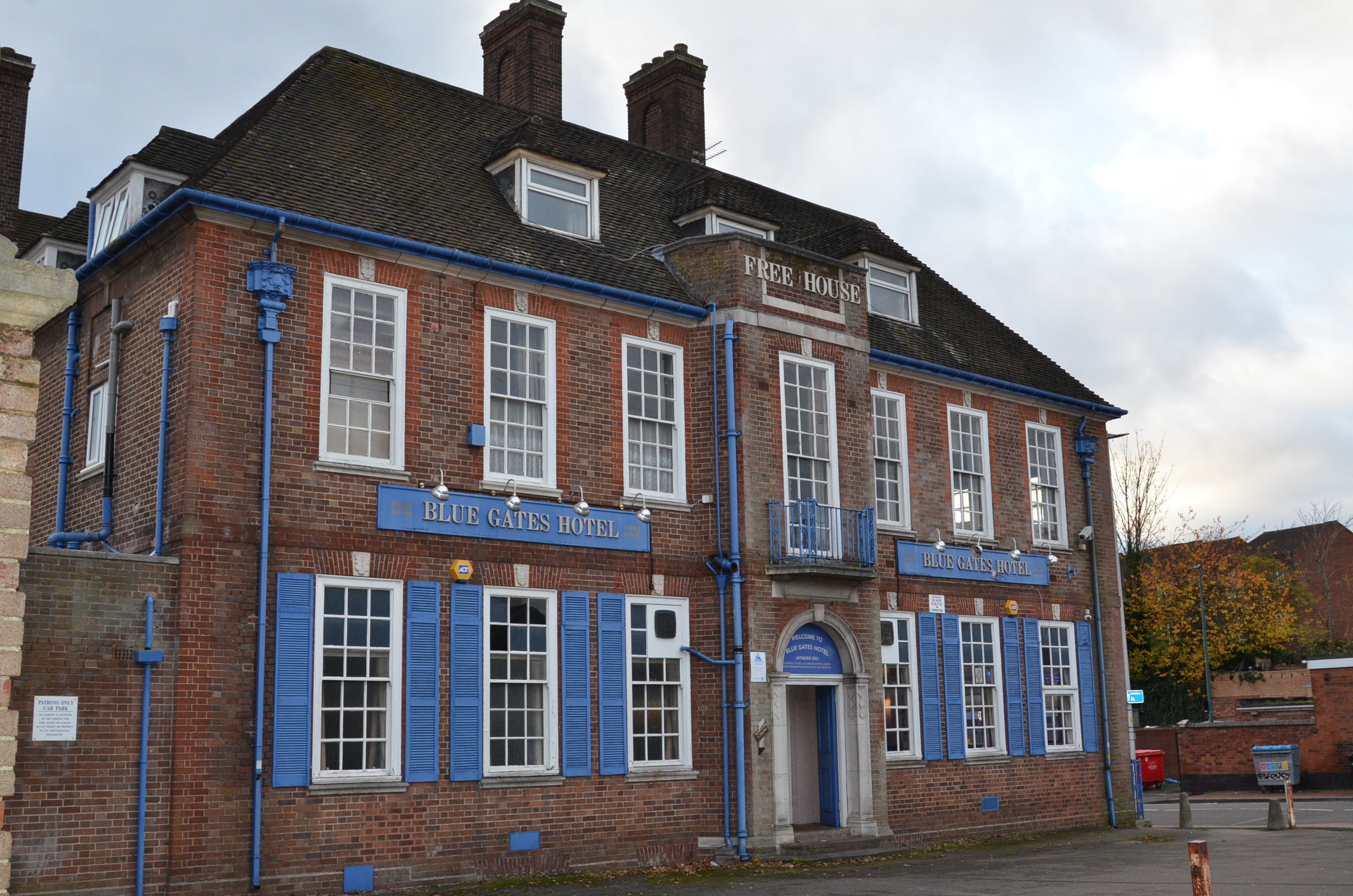
The Blue Gates hotel in Smethwick which Malcolm X visited in 1965, photographed in 2021

The US civil rights activist Malcolm X travelled to Smethwick on 12 February 1965 following an invitation by Jouhl. Malcolm X stated to the newspapers that he visited because he was "disturbed by reports that coloured people in Smethwick are being treated badly".

Jouhl met Malcolm X in Marshall Street where he observed posters reading "Coloured people need not apply". Malcolm X reacted by stating that, "This is worse than in America. This is worse than Harlem. In New York I haven’t seen such things, but there we have other attacks and discrimination against Black people."

Fearing for his safety during this midday walkabout, Jouhl expressed his worry that one of the white residents would harm Malcolm X and offered the services of the IWA to accompany him on the walk down the street. However, Malcolm X refused and stated he was confident and wanted to walk alone. He would keep his eyes open for any bricks being thrown his way.

Following the walk's conclusion, Malcolm X said that he wanted to go to a pub so Jouhl, and his close comrade Jagmohan Joshi, accompanied him to the Blue Gates pub whereupon Jouhl and Malcolm X went into the smoking room.

Jouhl says:

I ordered a drink and the barmaid already knew me and she said that, 'My [landlord] doesn't allow Black people to drink here. You can have a drink in the bar' ... Malcolm X said there was no point, and we walked into the bar where several IWA members were. He had a soft drink and chatted with different people about the colour bar. He was there for 15 minutes, and he said, 'Keep up the fight. The only way to defeat the colour bar and racism is to fight it back.'

=== Legacy of Malcolm X visit ===
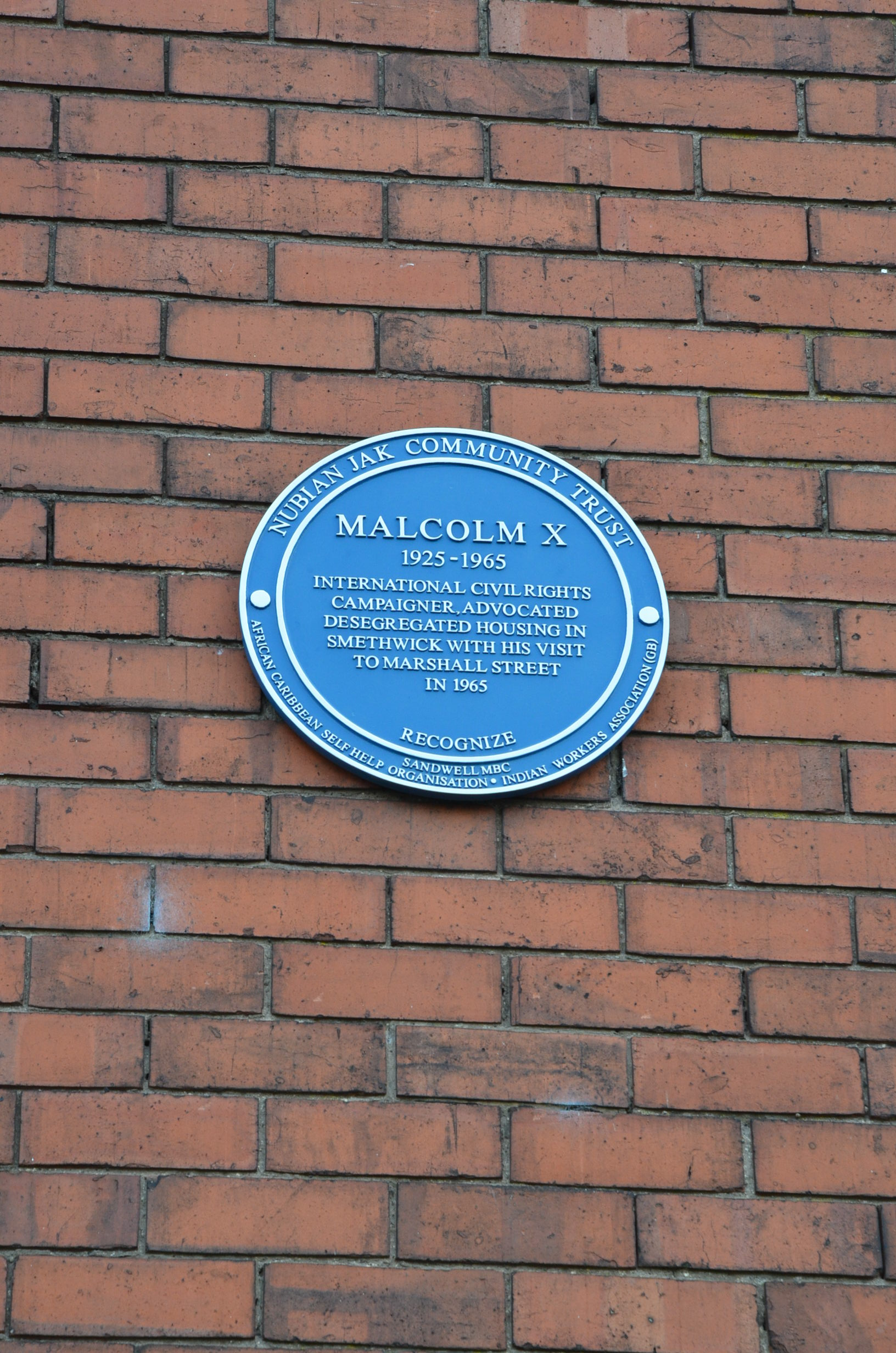
Malcolm X blue plaque in Marshall Street

The visit gained press coverage at the time and was also captured in BBC film footage which had been hitherto unscreened until it was discovered in 2005, by Stephen C Page, a local artist.

The visit highlighted the issue of the colour bar and racism in the UK. Jouhl called Malcolm X's visit "the shot in the arm for the anti-racism struggle in Britain.” The publicity of the visit "put racism in Britain on the international map" for the first time occurring as it did just a few days before Malcolm X's assassination. This and the wider work of Jouhl and the IWA in the first two decades of the mid-20th century in raising awareness of the anti-racism movement helped bring the topic of racism to the national discourse during the 1964 general election and helped deliver the Race Relations Act 1965, the first legislation to outlaw discrimination due to colour, race, ethnic origin, or national origins in public places in Great Britain.

Although segregation could continue in private clubs, such as the Smethwick Labour Club, it was now officially ended in pubs.

The visit of Malcolm X and his meeting with Jouhl and the IWA is now commemorated by a stained glass window display in the Red Lion pub which depicts the two anti-racism campaigners. A plaque in Marshall Street has been erected marking the visit.

The colour bar system of apartheid had led directly to the Indian immigrant community setting up their own pubs, Desi pubs, in the 1970s where they could play Indian music and serve Indian food and have safe places which acted as something of a community hub for many. Initially, the Desi pubs also provided their patrons with access to advice on legal, employment and marriage matters as well as offering a community fund for those who suffered hard times.

As of 2018, 55.9% of the population of Smethwick was described as "non-white", a higher percentage of "ethnic minorities" than the borough of Sandwell (30.1%) or England overall (14.6%). Smethwick contains a rich array of Desi pubs and across the UK these are multicultural establishments for all.

The pub where it all began, the Blue Gates, is a Desi pub now.

== Other work ==
Jouhl organised for six coaches of IWA members to be sent to the 1984–1985 miners' strike in solidarity with the plight of the striking workers even though the non-white workers experienced racism from some miners on the picket lines.

== Order of the British Empire ==
Jouhl was awarded the Order of the British Empire (civil division) in 2000 for 'services to Community Relations and to Trade Unionism'.

== Legacy ==
Former BBC producer and broadcaster Charles Parker interviewed Jouhl and included details of Jouhl's life in his play, The Great Divide, including a description of visiting a pub for the first time.

Another play is Marshall Street by Paul Magson.
