= Constantine v Imperial Hotels Ltd =

1944 English contract law case

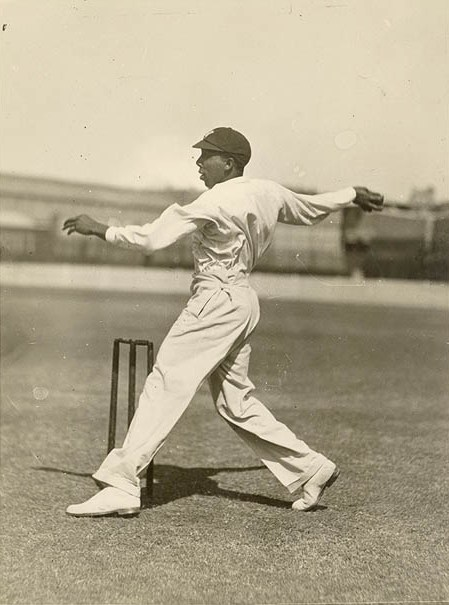
- Citation: [1944] KB 693

Case opinions
- Birkett J

Keywords
- Racial discrimination, innkeeper's duty of hospitality

Constantine v Imperial Hotels Ltd [1944] KB 693 is an English tort law and contract case, concerning the implied duty of an innkeeper to offer accommodation to a guest unless for just cause.

== Facts ==
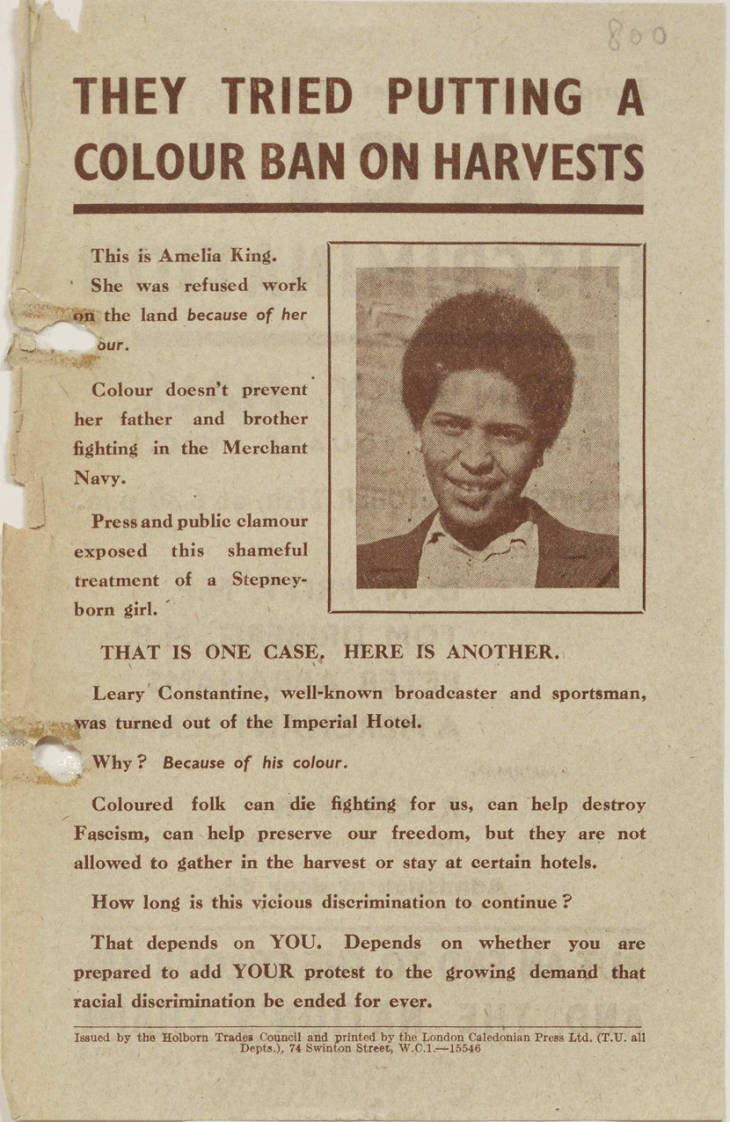
Rear face of a Holborn Trades Council leaflet promoting a 1943 anti-discrimination meeting (transcription)

In 1943, Learie Constantine, a black Trinidadian professional cricketer who had played for the West Indies but lived in the UK, travelled to London to play for the Dominions team against England at Lord's. He and his family had a reservation to stay at the Imperial Hotel, London in Russell Square; he had been assured that he and his family would be welcomed and treated with the utmost respect. When they arrived at the hotel however, they were informed they could stay only one night on account of complaints about their presence made by white American military servicemen who were also staying at the hotel. According to a newspaper report, the receptionist said "we won't have niggers in this hotel".

They were treated as outcasts, and Constantine was outraged. He claimed the hotel was in breach of contract. In Britain there was no statute that expressly outlawed racial discrimination. Constantine claimed that the hotel committed a tort, deriving from the common law principle that innkeepers must not refuse accommodation to guests without just cause. Constantine was represented in the King's Bench Division of the High Court by Sir Patrick Hastings and Rose Heilbron as leading and junior counsel respectively.

== Judgment ==
Mr Justice Birkett held that a right of Constantine had been violated. It was accepted that an innkeeper had a duty to provide reasonable accommodation and rejected the contention that when the hotel offered to lodge Constantine elsewhere, it was fulfilling that duty. Furthermore, even though Constantine suffered no pecuniary damage, the violation of the right was in principle capable of justifying a remedy. He was awarded the small sum of five guineas in damages.

== Significance ==
The ruling did not end the colour bar in some British hotels and other public establishments.

It was not until after the Civil Rights Act of 1964 in the USA, and the Bristol Bus Boycott, that the Labour Party committed to a general statute against racial discrimination with the passage of the Race Relations Act 1965. The 1965 Act created a Race Relations Board, on which Constantine served. This was further extended to all public services and employment by the Race Relations Act 1976. The law is now found in the Equality Act 2010.

In 1954, Constantine wrote Colour Bar, a book dealing with racial prejudice in Britain.

Cartoonist David Low drew one of his more famous cartoons attacking the hotel's treatment of Learie Constantine.

== See also ==
- Equality Act 2010
- Invitation to treat
- Heart of Atlanta Motel, Inc. v. United States
