= Geoffrey Masterman Wilson =

Sir Geoffrey Masterman Wilson KCB CMG (7 April 1910 – 11 July 2004) was a British barrister and civil servant who became a vice-president of the World Bank. In later life he chaired the Race Relations Board and Oxfam.

In 1947–1948, he was an alternate member of the United Nations Commission on Human Rights, led by Eleanor Roosevelt, which worked on the Universal Declaration of Human Rights.

== Early life ==
The third son of Alexander Cowan Wilson and his wife Edith Jane Brayshaw, Wilson was born at Birkenhead into a Quaker family. He was educated at Manchester Grammar School and Oriel College, Oxford, where he was a classical exhibitioner. He was chairman of the Oxford University Labour Club in 1930, and president of the Oxford Union in the Trinity term of 1931. In 1931 he joined the Middle Temple as a Harmsworth Law Scholar.

== Career ==
Wilson was called to the bar in 1934 and became a protégé of Stafford Cripps. When war broke out in 1939, he was in some difficulty as a Quaker. He avoided the conundrum of fighting or resisting fighting by leaving the bar and travelling overseas with Cripps, as his secretary, on an informal five-month world tour. In India, they met Gandhi, Nehru, and Jinnah. After Burma, they went to China and met Chiang Kai-shek, and to Moscow, to visit foreign minister Molotov. They returned to China and went on to the United States, where Cripps carried out a "propaganda tour", returning to England in April 1940. On their travels, they jointly kept a shared diary which came to some 180,000 words. Soon after their return, Cripps was sent back to Moscow as the British ambassador and took Wilson with him as a junior diplomat. They were there until January 1942, the last four months at Samara, then called Kuybyshev, 500 miles east of Moscow, where the diplomatic corps retreated as the German forces came near to Moscow. On their return to London, Wilson joined the Foreign Office and Cripps became Lord Privy Seal, then Minister of Aircraft Production, but they remained close friends.

Serving in the Russian department of the Foreign Office, Wilson had to translate Stalin's letters to Churchill. In February 1945, he was sent to the Yalta Conference, sitting near Churchill, taking minutes.

After the war, Wilson returned to his career at the bar.

In 1947, he was asked by the Foreign Office to draft a Convention of Human Rights. Charles Dukes, a trade unionist, was to be sent by Ernest Bevin as the first British representative on the new United Nations Commission on Human Rights, and Masterman was appointed as his alternate member and legal advisor. In 1947, they worked together on the British input into the drafting of the Universal Declaration on Human Rights.

After that, Wilson rejoined his friend Cripps at HM Treasury, then was seconded for a year to the Cabinet Office. From 1951 to 1953 he was in Ceylon as Director of the Colombo Plan Technical Co-Operation Bureau. In 1955, he headed the office of R. A. Butler, when he was Lord Privy Seal. In 1956, he was promoted to under-secretary. In 1958, he was posted to Washington D.C. as deputy head of the Treasury delegation, also joining the World Bank as Alternative Executive Director. In 1961, he became vice-president of the World Bank. In 1966, he returned to London as deputy secretary of the new Ministry of Overseas Development, then was at the Commonwealth Secretariat as deputy director-general for economic affairs. From 1971 to 1977 he held his last paid job as chairman of the Race Relations Board, retiring when it was merged with the Commission for Racial Equality.

In retirement, Wilson took on the role of chairman of Oxfam, an overseas aid charitable organization, serving it until 1983, when he took the chair of Action for Development and Disability.

== Personal life ==
In 1946, Wilson married firstly Julia Stafford Trowbridge, daughter of Alexander B. Trowbridge, an American actor; they had two sons and two daughters and divorced in 1979. In 1989 he married secondly Stephanie Stainsby.

One of Wilson's sons, Peter Stafford Wilson (1951–2023) became a theatrical producer.

== Honours ==
- Companion of the Order of St Michael and St George, 1962 New Year Honours
- Companion of the Order of the Bath, May 1968
- Knight Commander of the Order of the Bath, December 1968
