= Bristol Bus Boycott =

1963 protest against racial discrimination on public buses in Bristol, UK

- Audley Evans, Paul Stephenson and Owen Henry, pictured in front of a 1960s Bristol bus
- Date: 30 April 1963
- Location: Bristol, England
- Participants: Paul Stephenson, Roy Hackett, Owen Henry, Audley Evans and Prince Brown
- Outcome: Employment of first non-white conductor, 17 September 1963

The Bristol Bus Boycott of 1963 arose from the refusal of the Bristol Omnibus Company (in conjunction with the Transport and General Workers' Union) to employ Black or South Asian bus crews in the city of Bristol, England. In line with many other British cities at the time, there was widespread racial discrimination in housing and employment against so-called "Coloureds". An organisation later named the West Indian Development Council was founded by Roy Hackett, Owen Henry, Audley Evans, Prince Brown, and led by youth worker Paul Stephenson as group spokesperson. Guy Reid-Bailey would later become a member. The West Indian Development Council was created to end the discriminatory colour bar policy at the Bristol Omnibus Company, which prevented Black and Asian workers from operating the buses. The West Indian Development Council started a boycott of the company's buses by Bristolians, which lasted for four months until the company and union backed down and overturned their policy.

The boycott drew national attention to racial discrimination in Britain and the campaign was supported by national politicians, with interventions being made by church groups and the High Commissioner for Trinidad and Tobago. The Bristol Bus Boycott was considered by some to have been influential in the passing of the Race Relations Act 1965 which made "racial discrimination unlawful in public places" and the Race Relations Act 1968, which extended the provisions to employment and housing.

== Background ==
Bristol in the early 1960s had an estimated 3,000 residents of West Indian origin, some of whom had served in the British military during the Second World War and some who had emigrated to the UK more recently. A large number of West Indians lived in the area around City Road in St Pauls, suffered discrimination in housing and employment and some encountered violence from Teddy Boy gangs of white youths. The community set up their own churches and associations, including the West Indian Association, which began to act as a representative body.

One of their foremost grievances was the colour bar operated by the Bristol Omnibus Company, which had been a nationalised company owned by the UK Government since 1950 and operated through the Transport Holding Company. Although there was a reported labour shortage on the buses, black prospective employees were refused employment offers as bus crews, although they were employed in lower paid positions in workshops and in canteens. The Bristol Evening Post and the Western Daily Press ran series on the colour bar, which was blamed by company management on the Transport and General Workers' Union (TGWU), which represented bus workers. Local union officials denied that there was any colour bar but in 1955 the Passenger Group of the TGWU had passed a resolution that "coloured" workers should not be employed as bus crews. Andrew Hake, curator of the Bristol Industrial Mission, recalled that "The TGWU in the city had said that if one black man steps on the platform as a conductor, every wheel will stop".

Some white conductresses expressed concern for their safety if they were crewed with black men. Another of the bus workers' concerns, apart from racism, was that a new competitive source of labour could reduce their earnings. Pay was low and workers relied on overtime to get a good wage. One shop steward said, "people were fearful of an influx of people from elsewhere (on the grounds it) would be reducing their earnings potential".

== The dispute ==
=== Boycott ===
Four young West Indian men, Roy Hackett, Owen Henry, Audley Evans and Prince Brown, formed an action group, later to be called the West Indian Development Council. They were unhappy with the lack of progress in fighting discrimination by the West Indian Association. Owen Henry had met Paul Stephenson, whose father was from West Africa, and who had been to college. The group decided that the articulate Stephenson would be their spokesman. Stephenson set up a test case to prove the colour bar existed by arranging an interview with the bus company for Guy Bailey, a young warehouseman and Boys' Brigade officer. When Stephenson told the company that Bailey was West Indian, the interview was cancelled. Inspired by the refusal of Rosa Parks to give up her seat on a bus in Alabama and the ensuing Montgomery bus boycott in the United States in 1955, the activists decided on a bus boycott in Bristol.

Their action was announced at a press conference on 29 April 1963. The following day, they claimed that none of the city's West Indians were using the buses and that many white people supported them. In an editorial, the Bristol Evening Post pointed out that the TGWU opposed the apartheid system in South Africa and asked what trade union leaders were doing to counteract racism in their own ranks. When reporters questioned the bus company about the boycott, the general manager, Ian Patey, said

The advent of coloured crews would mean a gradual falling off of white staff. It is true that London Transport employ a large coloured staff. They even have recruiting offices in Jamaica and they subsidise the fares to Britain of their new coloured employees. As a result of this, the amount of white labour dwindles steadily on the London Underground. You won't get a white man in London to admit it, but which of them will join a service where they may find themselves working under a coloured foreman? ... I understand that in London, coloured men have become arrogant and rude, after they have been employed for some months.

=== Support ===
Bristol University students march in support of the boycott.

Students from Bristol University held a protest march to the bus station and the local headquarters of the TGWU on 1 May, which attracted heckling from bus crews as they passed through the city centre, according to the local press. Local MP Tony Benn (Labour) contacted then Labour Opposition leader Harold Wilson, who spoke out against the colour bar at an Anti-Apartheid Movement rally in London. On 2 May, local Labour Party Alderman Henry Hennessey spoke of the apparent collusion between bus company management and the TGWU over the colour bar. On 3 May, the ruling Labour Group on the city council threatened him with expulsion, despite his honourable service of over forty years.

Tony Benn, Fenner Brockway and former cricketer Learie Constantine also condemned the bus company. Constantine was then serving as High Commissioner for Trinidad and Tobago. Constantine wrote letters to the bus company and Stephenson and spoke out against the colour bar to reporters when he attended the cricket match between the West Indies and Gloucestershire at the County Ground, which took place from 4 to 7 May. The West Indies team refused to publicly support the boycott, saying that sport and politics did not mix. During the game, local members of the Campaign Against Racial Discrimination (CARD) distributed leaflets urging spectators to support the action.

The local branch of the TGWU refused to meet with a delegation from the West Indian Development Council and an increasingly bitter war of words was fought out in the local media. Ron Nethercott, South West Regional Secretary of the union, persuaded a local black TGWU member, Bill Smith, to sign a statement which called for quiet negotiation to solve the dispute. It condemned Stephenson for causing potential harm to the city's Black and Asian population. Nethercott launched an attack on Stephenson in the Daily Herald newspaper, calling him dishonest and irresponsible. This led to a libel case in the High Court, which awarded Stephenson damages and costs in December 1963.

The Bristol Council of Churches launched a mediation attempt, saying

We seriously regret that what may prove an extended racial conflict arising from this issue has apparently been deliberately created by a small group of West Indians professing to be representative. We also deplore the apparent fact that social and economic fears on the part of some white people should have placed the Bristol Bus Company in a position where it is most difficult to fulfil the Christian ideal of race relations.

This in turn was criticised by Robert Davison, an official at the Jamaican High Commission, who stated that it was "nonsense to describe a group of West Indians as unrepresentative when no representative West Indian body existed".

At a May Day rally, held on Sunday 6 May in Eastville, Bristol Trades Council members publicly criticised the TGWU. On the same day Paul Stephenson had organised a demonstration march to St Mary Redcliffe church but there was a poor turnout. Some local West Indians said they should not ripple the water and according to Roy Hackett, they may have feared victimisation. The dispute led to what has been described as one of the largest mailbags that the Bristol Evening Post had ever received, with contributors writing in support of both sides of the issue.

=== Resolution ===
The union, the city with his support for the campaign, meeting with the Lord Mayor of Bristol and Frank Cousins, leader of the Transport and General Workers Union. He went to the Bristol Omnibus Company's parent, the Transport Holding Company and persuaded them to send officials to talk with the union. The company chairman told Constantine that racial discrimination was not company policy. Negotiations between the bus company and the union continued for several months until a mass meeting of 500 bus workers agreed on 27 August to end the colour bar. On 28 August 1963, Ian Patey announced that there would be no more discrimination in employing bus crews. It was on the same day that Martin Luther King made his famous "I Have a Dream" speech at the March in Washington. On 17 September, Raghbir Singh, a Sikh, became Bristol's first non-White bus conductor. A few days later two Jamaican, one being Norman Samuels, and two Pakistani men joined him.

== Aftermath ==
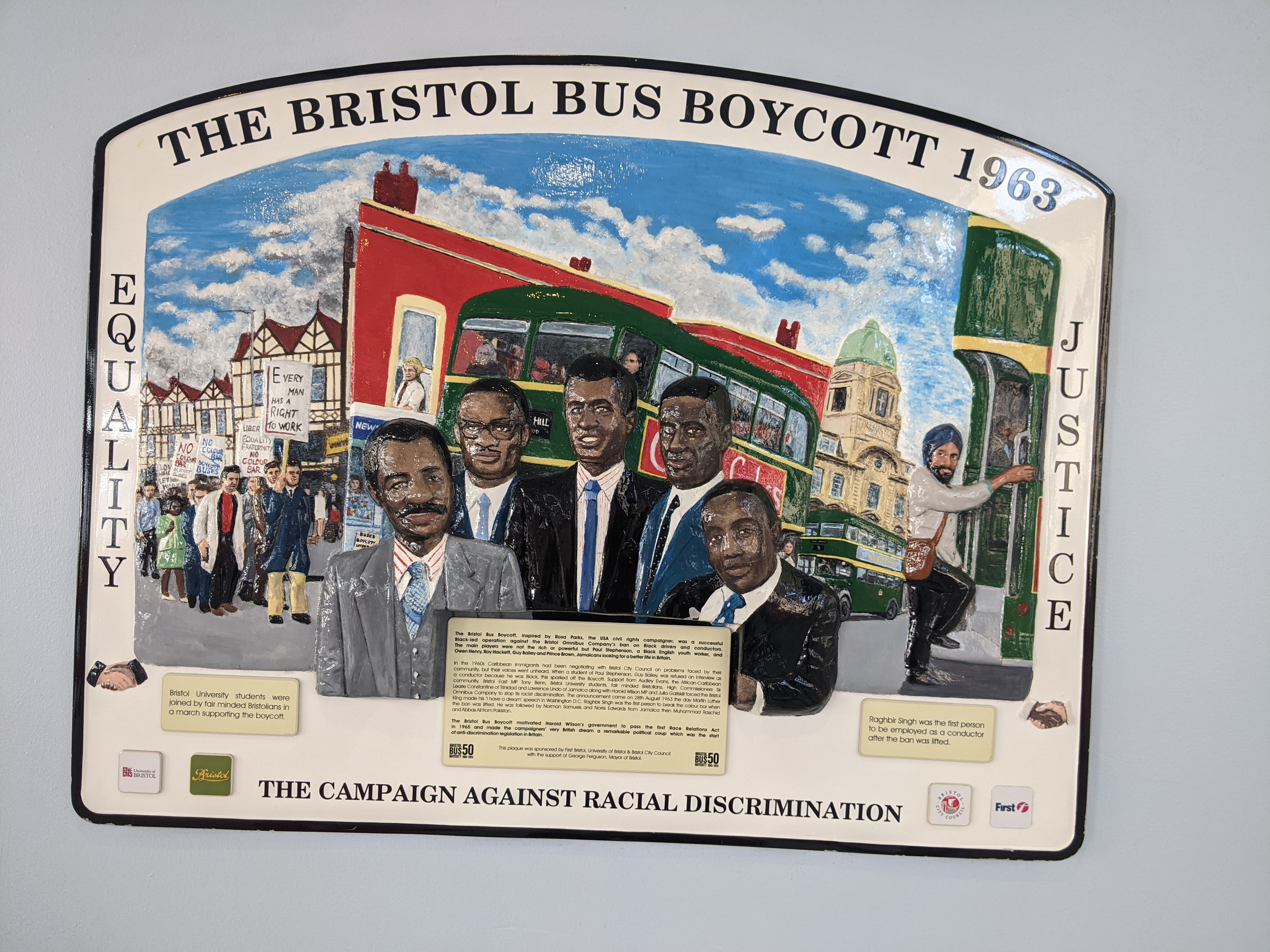
Plaque commemorating the boycott

In 1965, the United Kingdom Parliament passed a Race Relations Act, which made "racial discrimination unlawful in public places". This was followed by the Race Relations Act 1968 which extended the provisions to housing and employment. The enactment of this legislation has been cited by some as having been influenced by the Bristol bus boycott. Robert Verkaik, Legal Affairs Correspondent for The Independent newspaper, said "Few doubt that without Mr Stephenson's efforts it would have been difficult for Harold Wilson's Labour government to bring in Britain's first anti-discrimination laws." In 2003, as part of Black History Month, BBC Radio 4 broadcast a programme about the boycott.

Unite, the successor to the Transport and General Workers Union, issued an apology in February 2013. Laurence Faircloth, the union's South West secretary said of the union's stance at the time, "It was completely unacceptable. I can well accept the sense of injustice and pain that has been felt because [of] what happened in Bristol all those years ago".

=== Recognition ===
In the 2009 New Year Honours, Stephenson was appointed an Officer of the Order of the British Empire (OBE), for his part in organising the bus boycott ("for services to Equal Opportunities and to Community Relations in Bristol.") Bailey and Hackett were also awarded OBEs.

Recently, the predominant bus company in Bristol, First Bus, unveiled a new livery on a bus to celebrate 60 years of the Bristol Bus Boycott.

=== Deaths ===
Roy Hackett died in 2022, at the age of 93, and Paul Stephenson died in 2024, aged 87.

== See also ==
- 1957 Alexandra bus boycott
- Anti-discrimination law
- Civil and political rights
- Montgomery bus boycott
- Racial segregation in the United Kingdom
- Asquith Xavier—A British Railways employee who ended a colour bar at London stations by becoming the first non-white guard

== Works cited ==
- Dresser, Madge (1986). Black and White on the Buses: The 1963 Colour Bar Dispute in Bristol. Bristol, UK: Bristol Broadsides. ISBN 0-906944-30-9.
- Samuel, Raphael (1989). Patriotism: The Making and Unmaking of British National Identity. History Workshop. Vol. 1: History and Politics. New York: Routledge. ISBN 0-415-01307-0.
