= Paul Stephenson (civil rights campaigner) =

British civil rights activist (1937–2024)

Paul Stephenson OBE
- Born: 6 May 1937; Rochford, Essex, England
- Died: 2 November 2024 (aged 87)
- Occupation: Community worker
- Known for: Civil Rights activism, community relations

Paul Stephenson OBE (6 May 1937 – 2 November 2024) was a British community worker, activist and long-time campaigner for civil rights for the British African-Caribbean community in Bristol, England.

As a young social worker, in 1963 Stephenson led a boycott of the Bristol Omnibus Company, protesting against its refusal to employ Black or Asian drivers or conductors. After a 60-day boycott supported by thousands of Bristolians, the company revoked its colour bar in August. In 1964 Stephenson achieved national fame when he refused to leave a public house until he was served, resulting in a trial on a charge of failing to leave a licensed premises. His campaigns were instrumental in paving the way for the first Race Relations Act, in 1965. Stephenson was a Freeman of the City of Bristol and was appointed an Officer of the Order of the British Empire (OBE) in 2009.

== Early life ==
Stephenson was born in Rochford, Essex, on 6 May 1937, to a West African father and a British mother. His maternal grandmother Edie Johnson was a well known actress in the 1920s. At the age of three, he was evacuated to a care home in Great Dunmow, Essex, where he stayed for seven years. He received his secondary education at Forest Gate Secondary School in London, where he was the only black pupil. Service in the Royal Air Force followed, from 1953 to 1960. Stephenson gained a Diploma in Youth and Community Work from Westhill College of Education, Birmingham, in 1962, and then moved to Bristol to work as a youth officer for Bristol City Council, becoming the city's first black social worker.

== Bus boycott ==
In January 1955 the Passenger group, that is the section representing those working in Passenger Transport, of the local branch of the Transport and General Workers Union had passed a resolution that "coloured workers should not be employed as bus crews" by the Bristol Omnibus Company. The Bristol Evening Post ran a series of articles in 1961 exposing this colour bar. The union publicly denied the bar, but the company general manager, Ian Patey, did admit it. He attempted to justify the company policy by stating in a meeting with the city's Joint Transport Committee that he "had 'factual evidence' that the introduction of coloured crews in other cities downgraded the job, causing existing (white) staff to go elsewhere."

Several members of the city's West Indian community set up an organisation, the West Indian Development Council, to fight discrimination of this sort, aided by Stephenson, who was the city's first black youth officer. In 1963 Stephenson established that the bus company was indeed operating a colour bar and inspired by the example of Rosa Parks' refusal to move off a "whites only" bus seat in Montgomery, Alabama, leading to the Montgomery bus boycott, a Bristol Bus Boycott was organised.

As an articulate and university-educated person, Stephenson became spokesman for the boycott, which soon attracted nationwide media interest, and the campaign grew to receive support from Bristolians of all colours, and from Tony Benn, MP for Bristol East, and Harold Wilson, leader of the Labour opposition. After 60 days, on 28 August 1963 (the same day that Martin Luther King Jr. delivered his historic "I Have a Dream" speech in Washington, D.C.), the bus company capitulated and in September Raghbir Singh became Bristol's first non-white bus conductor.

In August 2014, a plaque was unveiled inside Bristol Bus Station commemorating the bus boycott.

== Further career ==
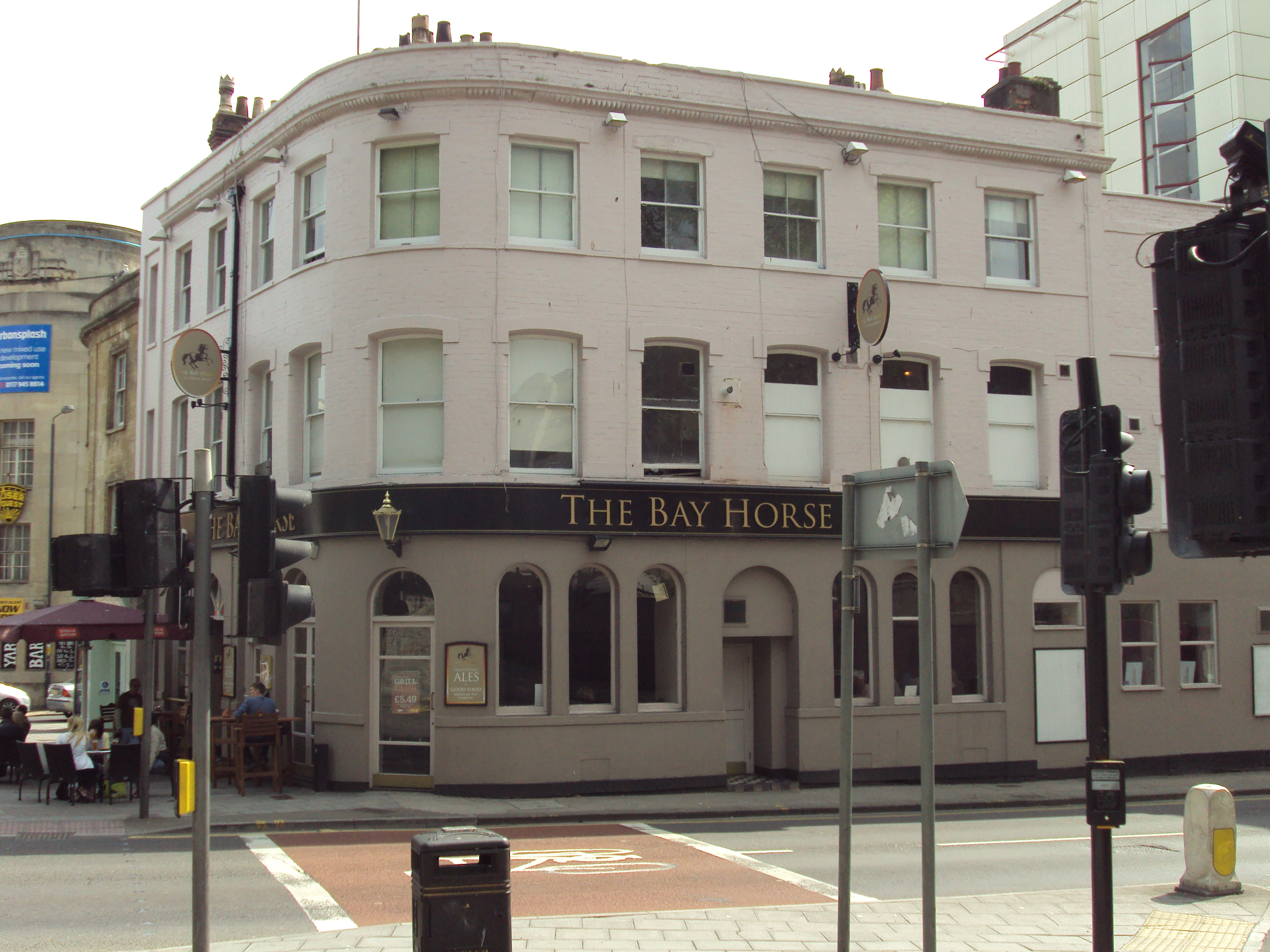
Stephenson was famously refused service at the Bay Horse pub in Bristol.

In the following year Stephenson achieved national prominence when he refused to leave a public house, the Bay Horse pub in Bristol, without being served. The bar manager reportedly told Stephenson, "We don't want you black people in here – you are a nuisance." Stephenson was arrested and charged with failing to leave a licensed premises. The case attracted media attention, and the Bristol Evening Post ran the story with the headline "West Indian leader made a fool of himself." At his trial in a magistrate's court, prosecutors alleged that he had behaved aggressively, but witness accounts refuted this claim. The case was dismissed and the barman was dismissed by his employers.

Following this, Stephenson left Bristol to work in Coventry as a Senior Community Relations Officer. In 1972, he went to London to work for the Commission for Racial Equality. While in London, he worked with boxer Muhammad Ali setting up the Muhammad Ali Sports Development Association in Brixton, and also set up the Cleo Laine Schools' Music Awards from 1977 to 1982 with Cleo Laine and John Dankworth. In 1975, Stephenson was appointed to the Sports Council and campaigned prominently against sporting contacts with apartheid South Africa. He became honorary president of Bristol's West Indian Parents' Association in 1979 and in 1981 was appointed to the Press Council.

On his return to live in Bristol in 1992, Stephenson helped set up the Bristol Black Archives Partnership (BBAP), which "protects and promotes the history of African-Caribbean people in Bristol." It was initiated when he placed his own personal archives with Bristol Record Office for safekeeping.

His autobiography, Memoirs of a Black Englishman, was published in 2012.

== Death ==
Stephenson died on 2 November 2024, at the age of 87. He had Parkinson's disease and dementia in his final years.

== Awards and honours/legacy ==
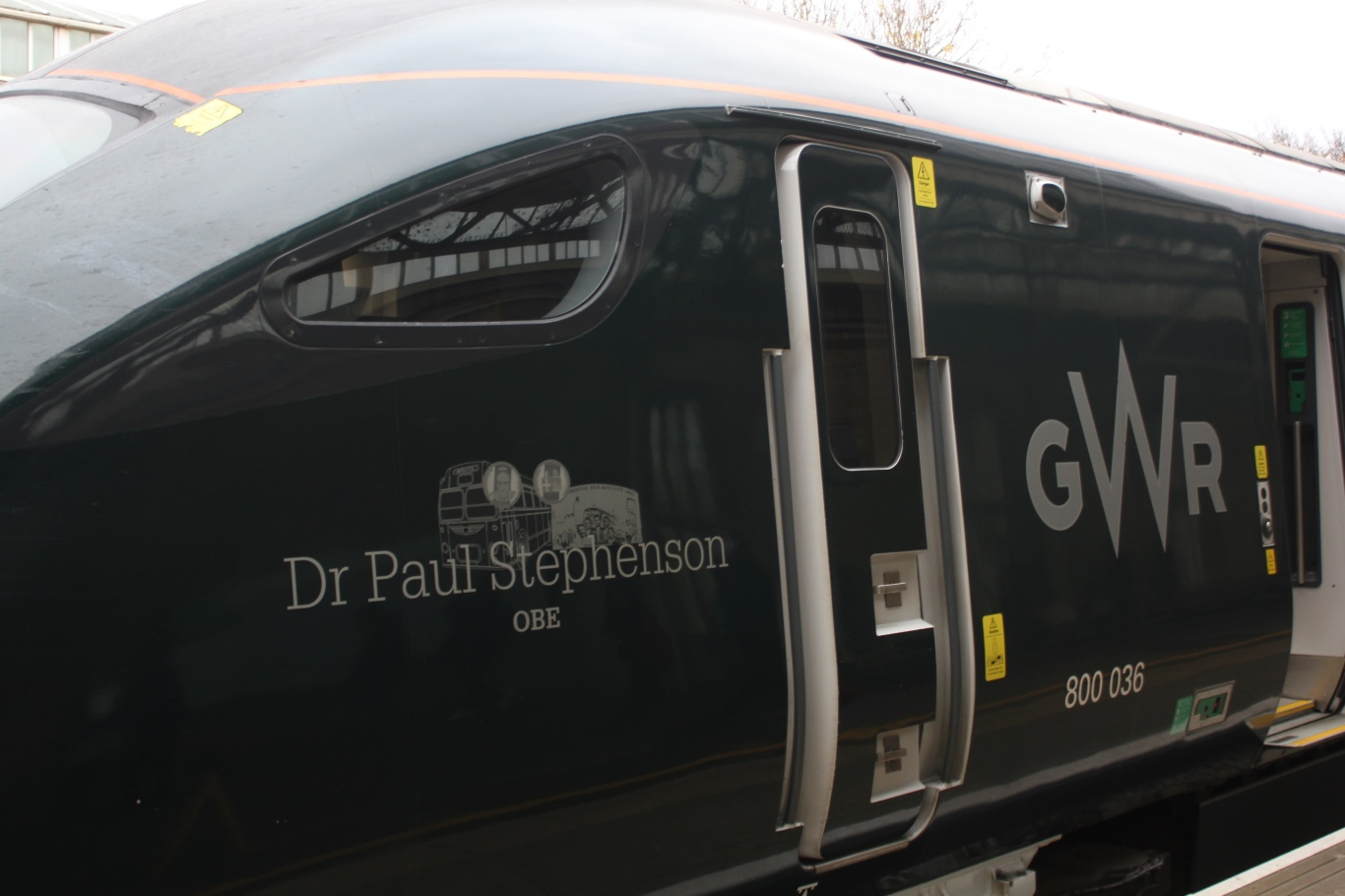
The train named in his honour

In 1988, Stephenson received the Bristol City Council Community Award for Achievement and Services Rendered to the Black Community and the West Indian Community Publishers Award. Further awards he was given include the Bristol West African and Caribbean Council Community Achievers' Award (1996), and the city council's One Person Can Make a Difference Award (2006).

In 2007, Stephenson was granted the Freedom of the City of Bristol, being the first black person to be so honoured. The citation stated: "Paul Stephenson has devoted his life to improving race relations and encouraging community involvement and is a founder member of the Bristol Black Archives Project which has contributed greatly to an understanding of the history of the City and has helped to build closer relations between all the communities of Bristol."

In 2009, he was given an OBE "for his services to equal opportunities and to community relations in Bristol". He received honorary degrees from the University of the West of England (Master of Education) in November 2009, "in recognition of his substantial contribution to pioneering work in race relations and the extension of opportunity to socially excluded young people", and the University of Bristol (Doctor of Law) in July 2014 "for his dedication to fighting for equality and civil rights across Bristol and around the world for over 60 years".

In November 2017, Stephenson received a Pride of Britain Award for Lifetime Achievement, presented to him by Lenny Henry, who said: "It is a well-known saying that to achieve greatness you have to stand on the shoulders of giants. You really are a giant. So without you, there wouldn't be any black or Asian politicians." The judges' citation said: "Thanks to Paul's courage, principles and determination, Britain is a more open and tolerant place today. He has changed the way we all live for the better, and his story reminds us that the battle for civil rights was not confined to America."

In June 2020, following the toppling of the Edward Colston statue in central Bristol by Black Lives Matter protestors, a campaign began to replace the statue with one of Paul Stephenson. On 20 October 2020, Great Western Railway named one of its Intercity Express Trains (800 036) in Stephenson's honour at a ceremony at Bristol Temple Meads station.

On 8 November 2024 he was featured on BBC Radio 4's Last Word programme.

== Archives and personal papers ==
Photographs, newspaper cuttings, letters and other miscellaneous items relating to Paul Stephenson and the 40th anniversary commemorations of the Bristol Bus Boycott campaign are held by Bristol Archives, as are the Bristol Black Archives Partnership collections,

== Books ==
- Paul Stephenson OBE with Lilleith Morrison, Memoirs of a Black Englishman (Foreword by Tony Benn), Tangent Books, 2011, ISBN 978-1-906477-39-4.

== Work cited ==
- Dresser, Madge (1986). Black and White on the Buses: The 1963 Colour Bar Dispute in Bristol (PDF). Bristol, UK: Bristol Broadsides. ISBN 978-0-906944-30-1.
