= Race Relations Board =

The Race Relations Board in the United Kingdom was established in 1966 following the passage of the Race Relations Act 1965. The act specified that the board should consist of a chairman and two other members. Its remit was to consider complaints under the Act. It dealt with 327 complaints of racial discrimination in 1966. The board was abolished by the Race Relations Act 1976, and its role was amalgamated with that of the Community Relations Commission to form the Commission for Racial Equality.

The first chairman of the board was Mark Bonham Carter. He visited the United States and Canada in November 1966 to draw lessons from the experiences of North America in handling racial discrimination. He stated that he viewed the existence of a significant African-American minority in itself as a "permanent historical problem" and opined that problems in the United Kingdom were "new". Geoffrey Bindman, QC was the legal advisor to the board throughout its existence and subsequently with the Commission for Racial Equality.

The last chairman, from 1971 to 1977, was Geoffrey Masterman Wilson.

The Board set up and co-ordinated seven regional conciliation committees whose role was to deal with complaints of discrimination. These committees set out reach a settlement of the difference between the complainant and the discriminator with an assurance from the latter that the problem would not arise again. However if no settlement was obtained, the matter would then be referred to the RRB and, if necessary, to the Attorney-General. There was no criminal sanction. Four cases were referred to the Attorney-General in the period up to 1968.
