= Bristol Omnibus Company =

British bus operator (1887–1987)

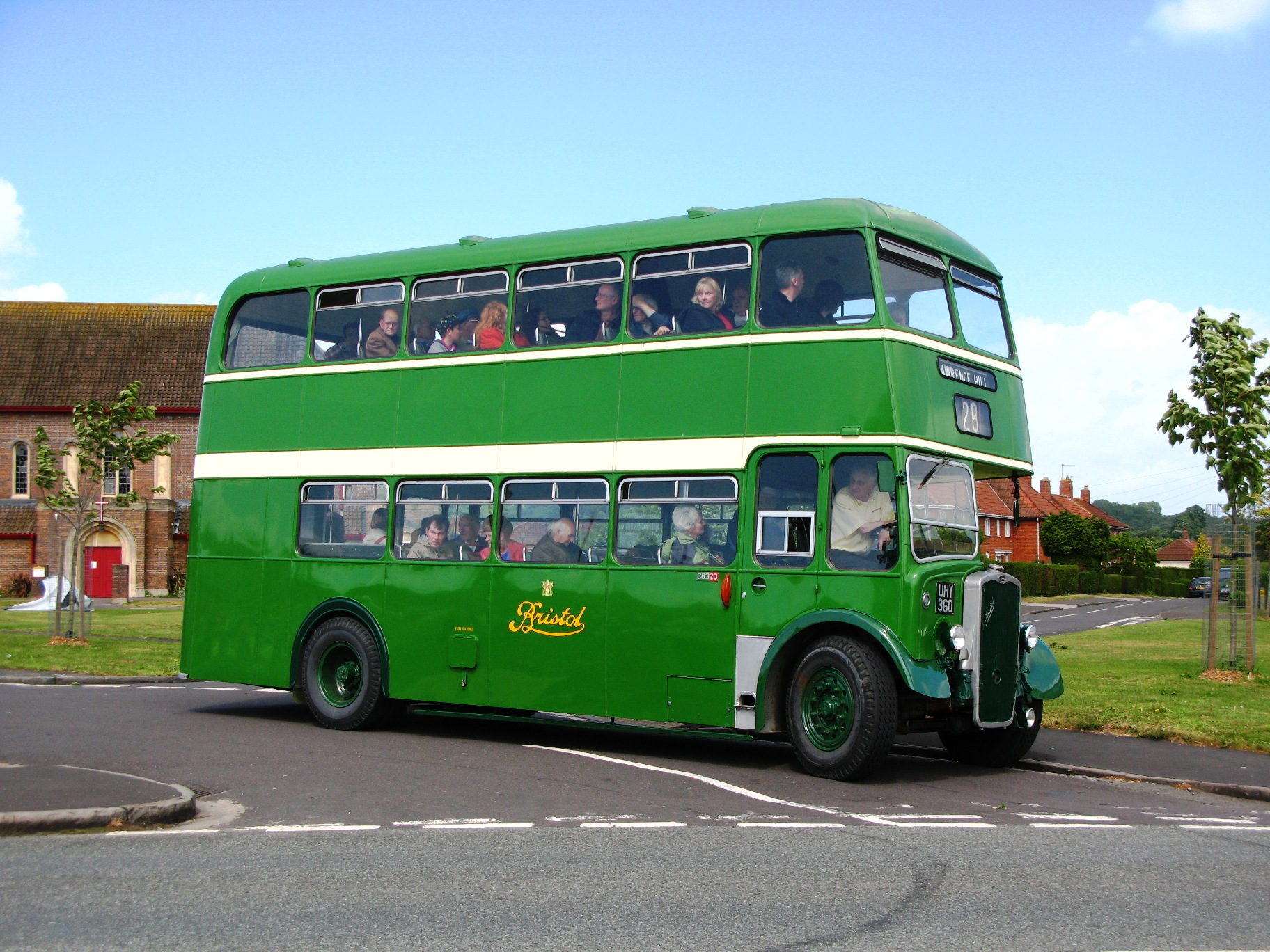
- Preserved Bristol KSW6B in 2011
- Founded: 1887
- Ceased operation: 1987
- Headquarters: Lawrence Hill
- Service area: Bristol; Gloucestershire; Somerset; Wiltshire
- Service type: Bus operator

The Bristol Omnibus Company was a dominant bus operator in Bristol, and was one of the oldest bus companies in the United Kingdom. It ran buses over a wide area of Gloucestershire, Somerset, Wiltshire and neighbouring counties.

== History ==
=== Early history ===
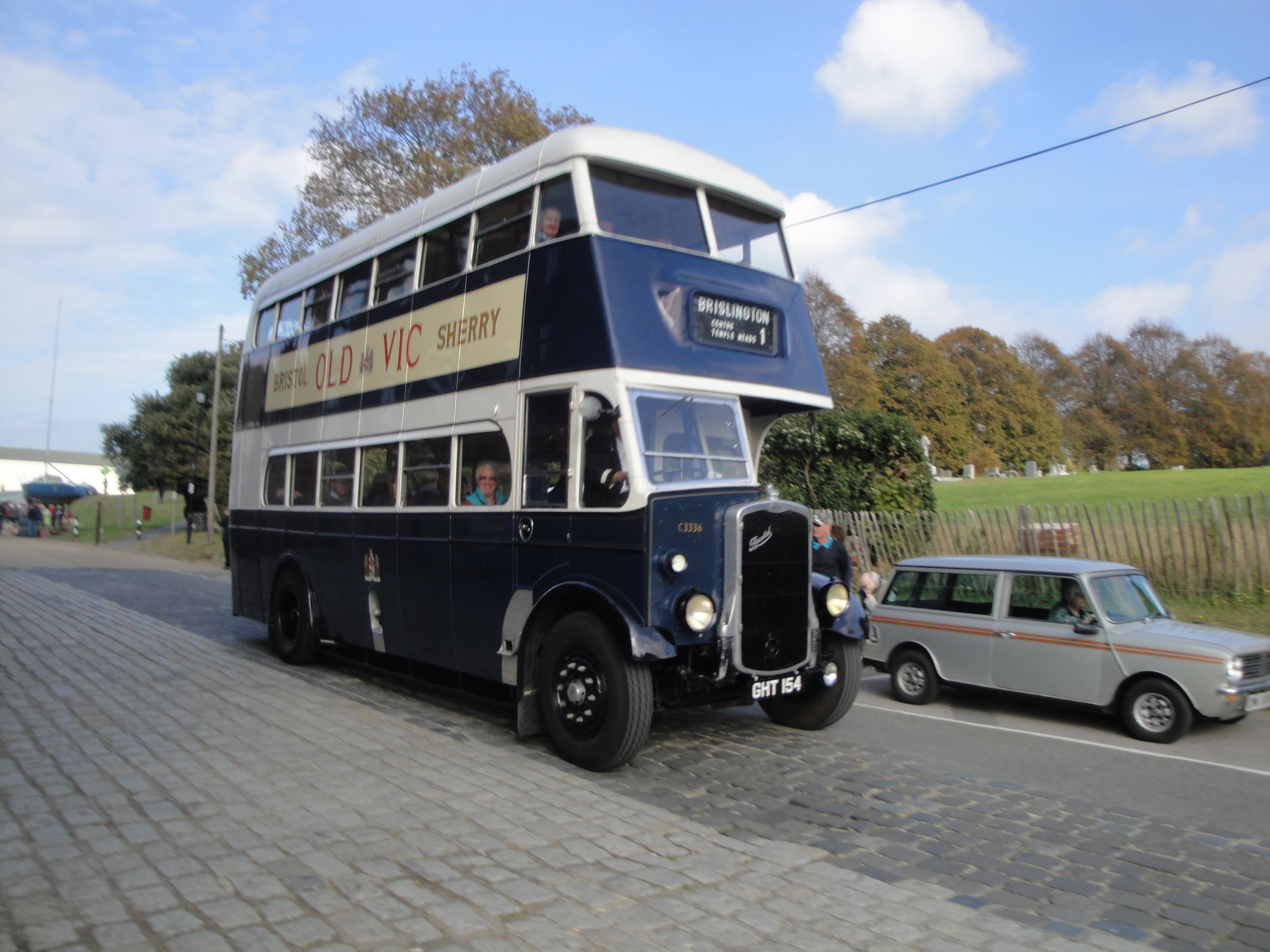
Preserved Bristol K5G in Bristol Tramways' blue colours in 2011

The Bristol Omnibus Company traces its origins to 1875, when George White formed the Bristol Tramways Company and began a horse-drawn omnibus service in Bristol from Upper Maudlin Street to Blackboy Hill. In 1887 the Bristol Tramways Company merged with the Bristol Cab Company to form the Bristol Tramways & Carriage Company.

In 1887, the company began a omnibus service to Clifton, and later started several more omnibus services to complement the tramways. In 1892, the Imperial Tramways Company moved its headquarters from London to Bristol. White and the senior management team of Bristol Tramways also ran Imperial Tramways, though they remained separate companies.

In 1895, the company began to operate electric trams, and in 1906 introduced motor buses on the route between the Centre and Clifton. Rapid expansion of its bus services followed, in both Bristol and the surrounding country areas. The company opened branches in Bath in 1909, Weston-super-Mare in 1910, Cheltenham in 1912 and Gloucester in 1913. In 1912 the company also bought the Clifton Rocks Railway, which closed in 1934. After World War I more branches were opened in Swindon (1921), Wells (1922) and Coleford (1924).

The company was not satisfied with the performance of the first buses it bought, and in 1908 began the manufacture of its own buses. Commercial chassis were considered unsuitable to the hilly terrain. The chassis were constructed adjacent to the company's tramway works at Brislington.

The company soon began to sell its buses to other operators. For 75 years, Bristol buses were widely used in the United Kingdom, and were also exported to many countries.

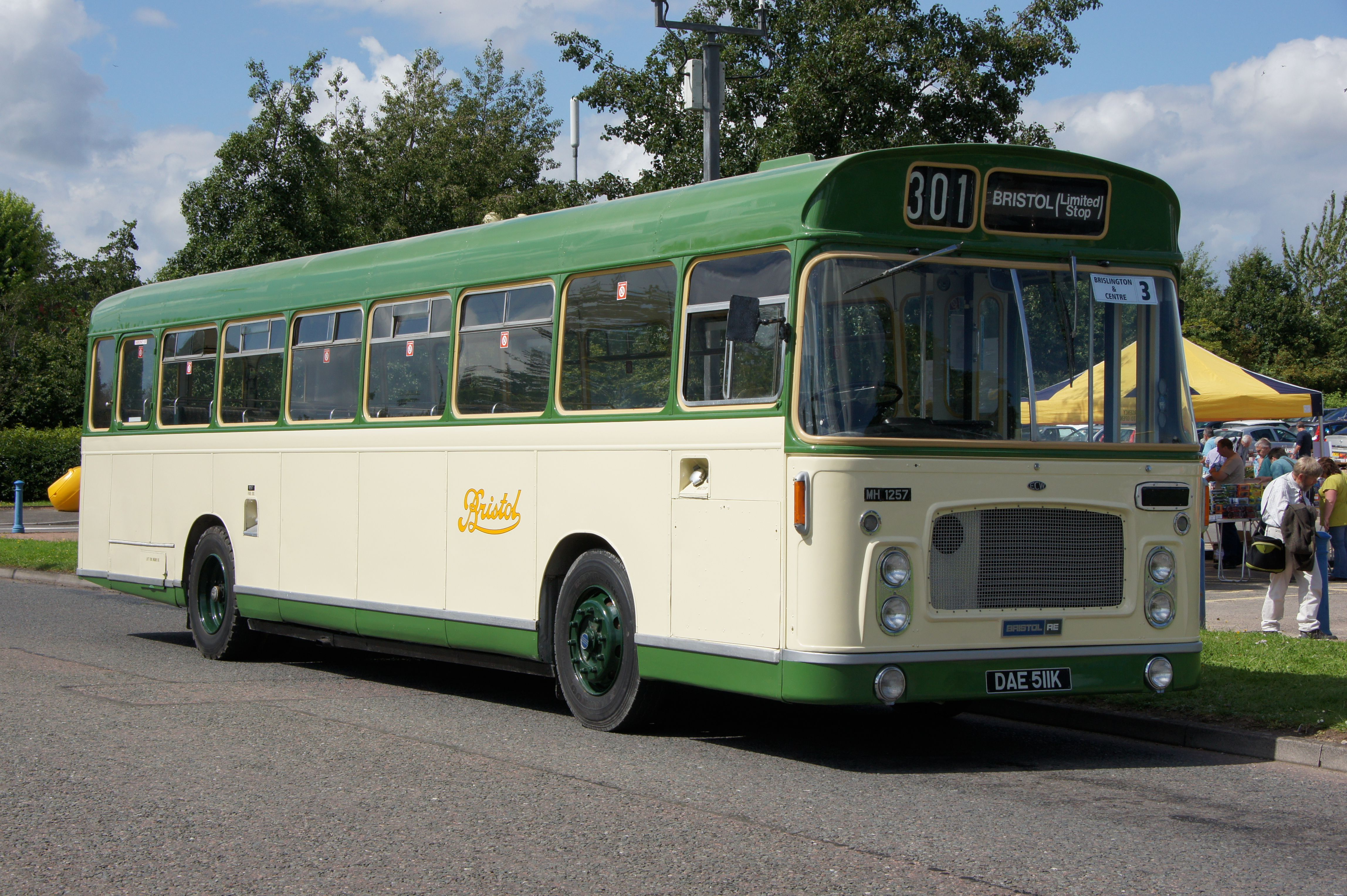
Preserved ECW-bodied Bristol RE with the 'Bristol scroll' in 2011

The Bristol scroll logo was adopted from the Bristol Aeroplane Company (a company that had been set up by White) to commemorate the building of Bristol Fighters at the Tramways Brislington Works during World War I.

In 1928, the company acquired control of another Bristol company, Greyhound Motors, which had started the first long-distance coach service between Bristol and London in 1925. The company continued to operate its coach services under the Greyhound name until 1972.

In 1929, the White family sold its controlling interest to the Great Western Railway, but by 1932 the railway sold its interest to the Western National Omnibus Company, half owned by the GWR and half by the Tilling Group. In 1932, the railway transferred some of its bus services to the company, in the Swindon and Weston-super-Mare areas and the service between Cheltenham and Oxford.

In 1930, the company sold its taxicab operations, which it had run since 1887, first with horses and from 1910 with motors.

Outside Bristol the company had operated a mostly rural bus network, but in 1936 the company took over the city bus services in Gloucester and later that year took over the two companies operating trams and buses in the city of Bath, including Bath Electric Tramways Company.

In Bristol, the corporation had the power to purchase the Bristol tramways. The option was never exercised, but led in 1937 to the formation of Bristol Joint Services, a joint undertaking between the company and the corporation which controlled Bristol's city buses (and initially also its trams) until 1978. The difference between the two operations was not generally apparent to the public as the same livery was used, differing only in the fleetname detail. Furthermore, there were regular loans of vehicles between the two organisations, and the fleet was numbered in a common series.

In 1941, Bristol was heavily bombed in the blitz. Losses included the main power station resulting in the last of Bristol's trams ceasing operation, and from then on the company only operated buses and coaches – although it kept the Bristol Tramways name for some years.

=== Nationalisation ===
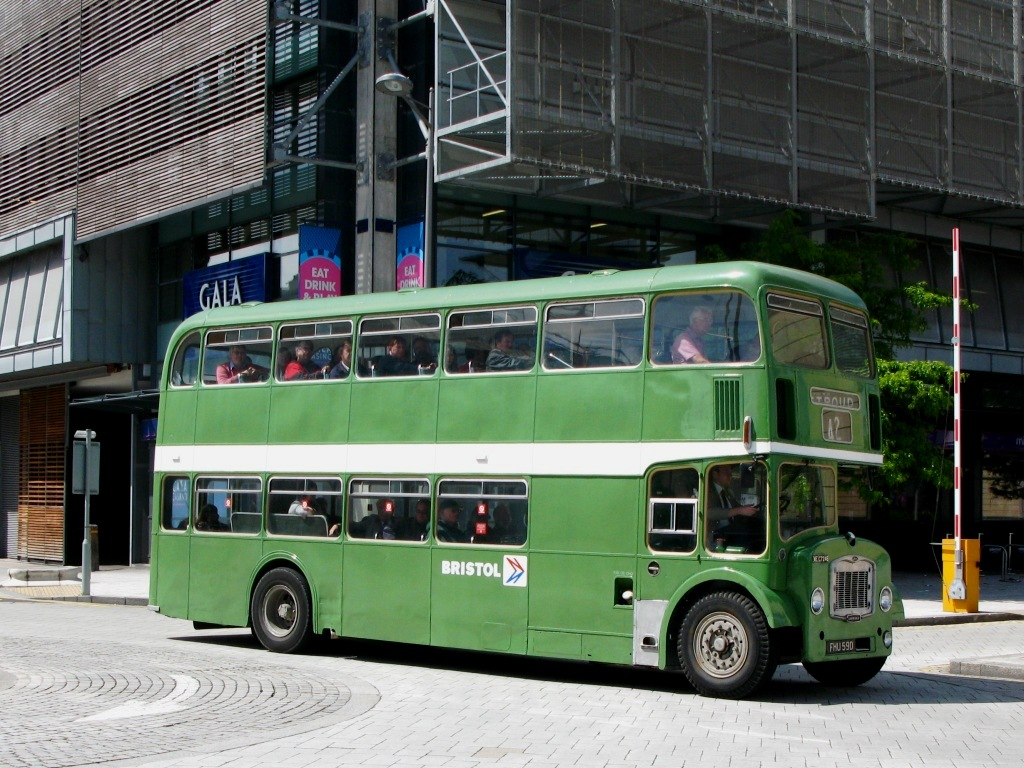
Preserved Bristol FLF with NBC livery in 2011

After World War II, the new Attlee government took steps to nationalise much of the country's transport industry. As a result, in 1948 the Tilling Group sold its bus interests to the government, and Bristol Tramways became a state-owned company, under the control of the British Transport Commission. Its chassis-building operation proved especially useful and, with the nationalisation of Eastern Coach Works of Lowestoft, enabled complete buses, coaches (and even some lorry tractor-units for British Road Services and two railbuses for British Railways) to be built solely for the State sector.

The new regime resulted in some rationalisation of the company's area of operations. Two other companies, Red & White and Western National, both also now state-owned, ran buses in the Stroud area of Gloucestershire, and those operations were transferred to Bristol Tramways in 1950. The company was also given control of Cheltenham District Traction, originally a Red & White operation, which ran local bus services in Cheltenham. In return, Bristol Tramways gave up its bus operations in the Forest of Dean.

The 1950s were the peak years of the company's operations. It ran over 1,200 buses in an area stretching from Hereford to Salisbury and from Oxford to Bridgwater. From 1950 (when the company acquired the independent Dundry Pioneer), until 1966 (when the Severn Bridge opened and Red & White started routes to Bristol), the company had a total monopoly of bus operations in Bristol, Bath, North Somerset and much of Gloucestershire. On 1 January 1955, the bus manufacturing operation was separated into another company, Bristol Commercial Vehicles Limited. In 1957, Bristol Tramways finally recognised reality and changed its name to the Bristol Omnibus Company Limited. The company opened Bristol bus station in Marlborough Street in 1958, and Bath bus station in Manvers Street in the same year.

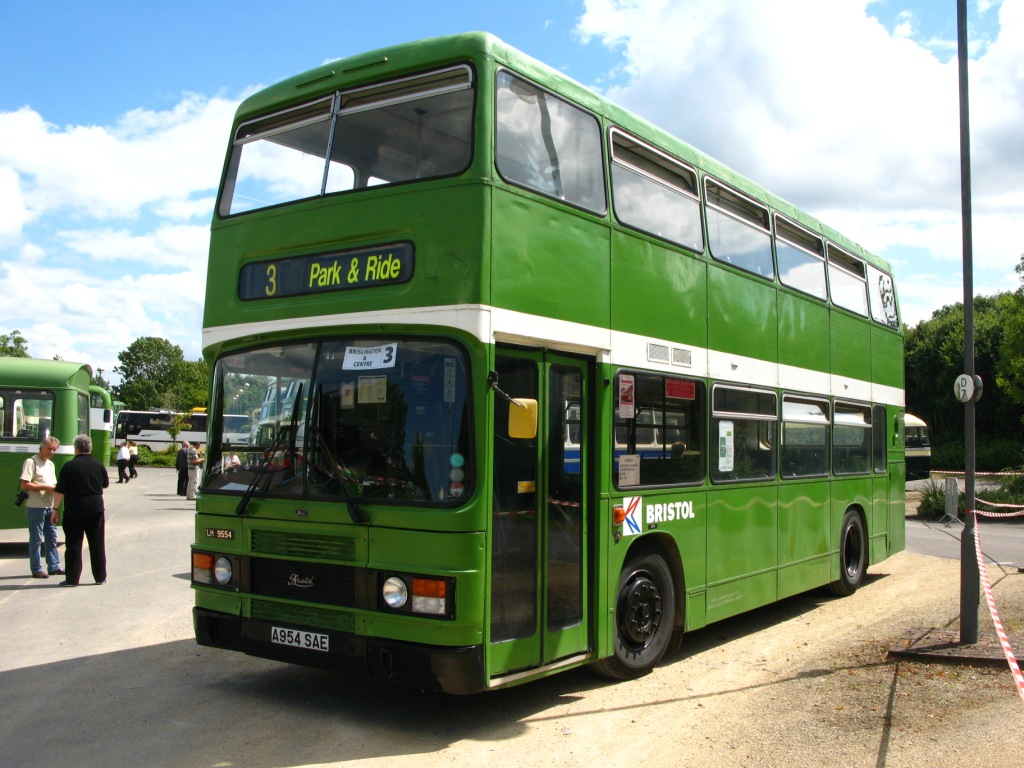
A preserved Leyland Olympian in NBC livery in 2011

In 1963, the company attracted national attention when its operation of a colour bar, denying employment to non-white bus crews resulted in a 60-day boycott, led by youth worker Paul Stephenson. After a bitter campaign the company finally climbed down and started to employ black and Asian crews in September of that year.

The 1960s and 1970s were years of declining bus usage, and the company struggled to make profits in the face of rising costs and falling revenues. Successive governments changed the structure of the state-owned bus sector. On 1 January 1963, Bristol Omnibus Company was included in the transfer of the British Transport Commission's transport assets to the state-owned Transport Holding Company, which in turn passed to the state-owned National Bus Company on 1 January 1969. In 1970, the operations of Western National in the Trowbridge area were transferred to Bristol Omnibus.

=== Privatisation ===
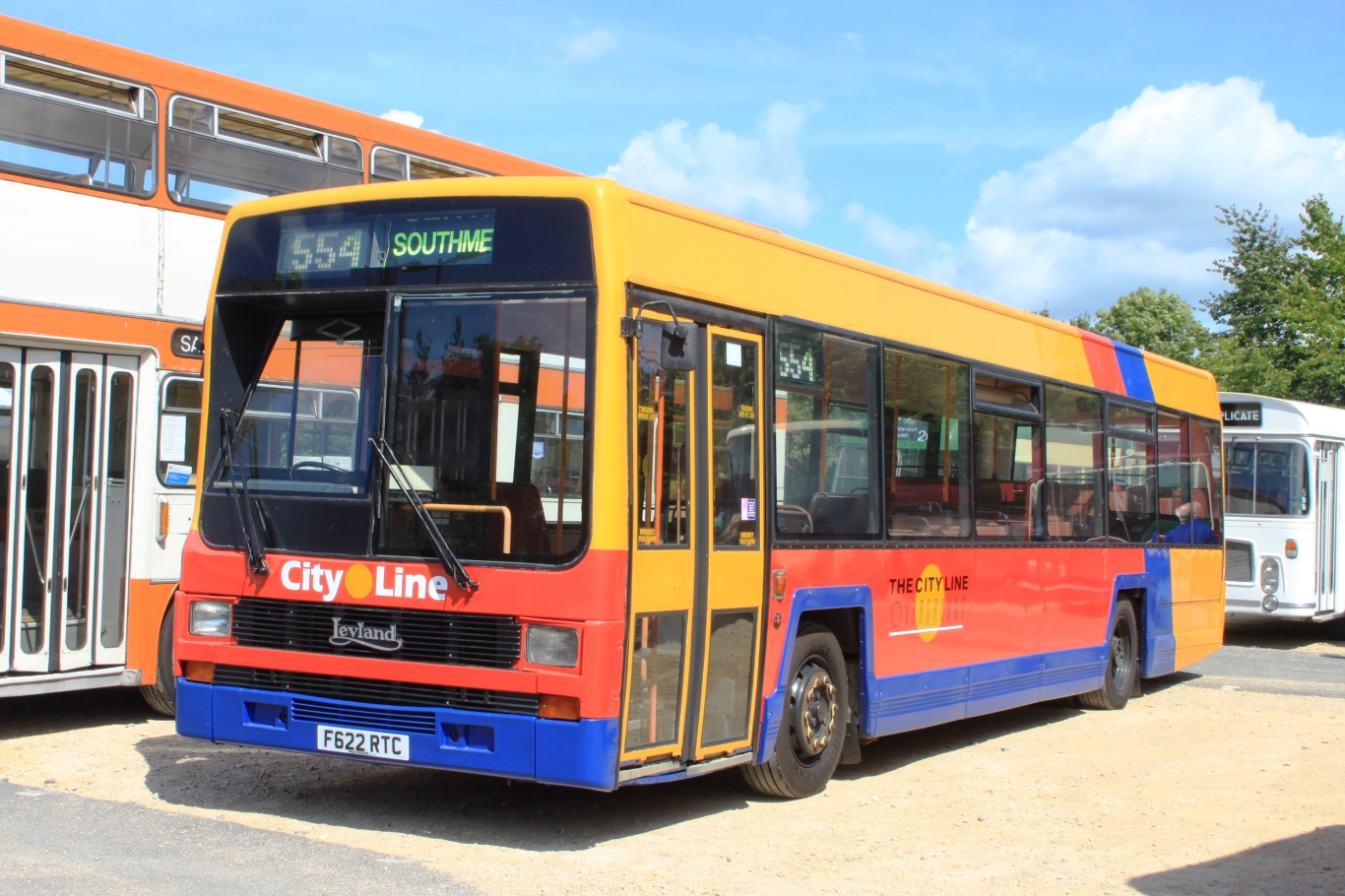
Preserved Leyland Lynx in 'City Line' colours in 2016

On 11 September 1983, the National Bus Company split the operation in two, with the Cheltenham & Gloucester Omnibus Company taking the services in Cheltenham, Gloucester, Stroud and Swindon. The remainder stayed with the existing Bristol Omnibus Company divided into two business units: Citybus services for services within Bristol, and Bristol Country Bus for services in Bath, Somerset and Wiltshire. In April 1985, Bristol Country Bus was rebranded as Badgerline and in 1986 its assets were transferred to a separate legal entity and privatised in September 1986 in a management buyout. Also in 1986, the Cheltenham & Gloucester Omnibus Company was sold to its management, trading as Western Travel, who, in 1993, sold it to Stagecoach.

The stub of the original company, now confined to city services in and around Bristol, traded under the City Line brand from 1985. In September 1987, the company was sold to Midland Red West, another privatised bus company which had been bought by its management the year before. In April 1988, Midland Red West was itself sold to Badgerline, returning the two parts of the former company to common ownership.

=== Subsequent history ===
Bristol Omnibus was included in the June 1995 merger of Badgerline with GRT Group to form FirstBus. The Bristol Omnibus name had fallen out of operational use for some time, as FirstBus rolled out its corporate identity to its subsidiaries. Bristol Omnibus Company eventually changed its legal name to First Bristol Buses Limited in 1999. The company was renamed again to First Somerset & Avon Limited in 2003, and to First West of England Limited in 2017. Under that name it is now the First company operating in Bristol, Bath, North Somerset, South Gloucestershire and West Wiltshire, but it remains the same legal entity incorporated on 1 October 1887.

== Archives ==
The records of Bristol Omnibus Company are held by Bristol Archives (Ref. 39735) (online catalogue), along with the personal papers of George White (Ref. 35810) (online catalogue).

== See also ==
- Buses in Bristol
- Bristol Bus Boycott
- List of bus operators of the United Kingdom

== Sources ==
- Hulin, P (1974). Bristol's Buses. Published by the author.
- Curtis, C; Walker, M (2007). Bristol Omnibus Services: The Green Years. Millstream Books. ISBN 978-0-948975-80-6.
