= Commission for Racial Equality =

Former British non-departmental public body

The Commission for Racial Equality (CRE) was a non-departmental public body in the United Kingdom which aimed to address racial discrimination and promote racial equality. The commission was established in 1976, and disbanded in 2007 when its functions were taken over by the newly created Equality and Human Rights Commission.

== History ==
The commission was established by the Race Relations Act 1976, under James Callaghan's Labour government. Its first chairman was former Conservative MP, David Lane. It was formed through the amalgamation of the Race Relations Board and the Community Relations Commission.

The Race Relations Act, which has now been superseded by the Equality Act 2010, applied in England, Wales and Scotland. It did not apply in Northern Ireland, where the Race Relations (NI) Order 1997 applies. The CRE's work covered all the areas where people were protected against discrimination under the Race Relations Act.

The mission statement of the commission was: "We work for a just and integrated society, where diversity is valued. We use persuasion and our powers under the law to give everyone an equal chance to live free from fear of discrimination, prejudice and racism".

The main goals of the CRE were:

- To encourage greater integration and better relations between people from different ethnic groups.
- To use its legal powers to help eradicate racial discrimination and harassment.
- To work with government and public authorities to promote racial equality in all public services.
- To support local and regional organisations, and employers in all sectors, in their efforts to ensure equality of opportunity and good race relations.
- To raise public awareness of racial discrimination and injustice, and to win support for efforts to create a fairer and more equal society.

The CRE organised the annual Race in the Media Awards (RIMA), launched in 1992, to encourage more informed coverage of race relations, diversity and multiculturalism as well as acknowledging excellence in the coverage of race issues by the UK media. In 2005, the Media Personality of the Year award was won by footballer Thierry Henry "for his strong stance against racism in football, most notably by initiating Nike's 'Stand Up, Speak Up' campaign".

When the CRE ceased to exist as a separate entity, its library was acquired by the Ahmed Iqbal Ullah Race Relations Resource Centre at the University of Manchester.

== Issues ==
- In October 2004, the commission was to be merged into a new single Great Britain equalities body, the Equality and Human Rights Commission (EHRC). However, the CRE proposed a new non-governmental public body to work alongside the CEHR to guide, advise and mediate on community relations, civic engagement and citizenship.
- National identity cards: in its January 2005 report, the CRE raised concerns over the potential effects of the Identity Cards Bill on ethnic minority and vulnerable groups in society.
- Segregation: on 22 September 2005, in the aftermath of the July bombings in London, Trevor Phillips gave a speech, "Sleepwalking to Segregation", warning that the UK was in danger of becoming a segregated nation.

== Commissioners ==
See also Category:Commissioners for Racial Equality

The CRE was run by up to 15 commissioners (including the chair), who were appointed by the Home Secretary. At January 2007 the commissioners were:

- Kay Hampton (chair)
- Khurshid Ahmed
- Yaseen Ahmed
- Mohammed Aziz
- Sir Colin Budd
- Julia Chain
- Jane Codona
- Rev Aled Edwards
- Dilwar Hussain
- Sir Dexter Hutt
- Uzo Iwobi
- Sir Digby Jones
- Gloria Mills
- Cherry Short

== Controversy ==
When it was first established, there was much judicial and governmental unrest about the scope of the commission's investigatory powers. In one particular case, Lord Denning MR went so far as to compare the use by the CRE of its investigative powers to "the days of the inquisition", and to suggest that it had in consequence created racial discord. Subsequent House of Lords decisions made clear that the commission had no power to launch investigations into employers' affairs where there had been no allegation of discrimination.

== See also ==
- British labour law
- Ethnic relations
