= Race Relations Act 1968 =

Act of the Parliament of the United Kingdom

Race Relations Act 1968 (Note: Section 29(1).)
- Act of Parliament
- Parliament of the United Kingdom
- Long title: An Act to make fresh provision with respect to discrimination on racial grounds, and to make provision with respect to relations between people of different racial origins.
- Citation: 1968 c. 71
- Introduced by: James Callaghan MP, Secretary of State for the Home Department (Commons); Lord Stonham (Lords)
- Territorial extent: England and Wales; Scotland; (Note: Section 29(4).)

Dates
- Royal assent: 25 October 1968
- Commencement: 25 November 1968 (Note: Section 29(2).)
- Repealed: 1 September 1977 (Note: The Race Relations Act 1976 (Commencement No. 2) Order 1977 (SI 1977/840).)
Other legislation
Amends	House of Commons Disqualification Act 1957; Race Relations Act 1965
Amended by	House of Commons Disqualification Act 1975; Northern Ireland Assembly Disqualification Act 1975
Repealed by	Race Relations Act 1976

Status: Repealed

Text of statute as originally enacted

The Race Relations Act 1968 (c. 71) was an act of the Parliament of the United Kingdom making it illegal to refuse housing, employment, or public services to a person on the grounds of colour, race, ethnic or national origins in Great Britain (although not in Northern Ireland, which had its own parliament at the time). It also created the Community Relations Commission to promote 'harmonious community relations'. The act did not apply to police services.

The act made amendments to the Race Relations Act 1965. It was superseded (and repealed) by the Race Relations Act 1976.

On 25 October 1968, the Race Relations Bill was given royal assent and so came into law as the Race Relations Act 1968. This act expanded the provisions of the Race Relations Act 1965, which had banned racial discrimination in public places and made promoting racial hatred a crime. The 1968 act focused on eradicating discrimination in housing and employment. It aimed to ensure that the second-generation immigrants "who have been born here" and were "going through our schools" would get "the jobs for which they are qualified and the houses they can afford". Although there was considerable debate during the second reading of the Race Relations Act 1968, consensus was eventually reached, with the Race Relations Act 1968 passing its third reading 182 ayes to 44 noes.

The act was criticised for poorly translating "new standards of behaviour" into an effective legal document. The bill which introduced the act was the focus of Enoch Powell's Rivers of Blood speech, delivered to the West Midlands Conservative Association on 20 April 1968. Powell was sacked from Ted Heath's shadow cabinet the following day.

== See also ==
- Ethnic relations
- Racism in the United Kingdom
