= Race Relations Act 1965 =

Act of the Parliament of the United Kingdom

Race Relations Act 1965 (Note: Section 8(1).)
- Act of Parliament
- Parliament of the United Kingdom
- Long title: An Act to prohibit discrimination on racial grounds in places of public resort; to prevent the enforcement or imposition on racial grounds of restrictions on the transfer of tenancies; to penalise incitement to racial hatred; and to amend section 5 of the Public Order Act 1936.
- Citation: 1965 c. 73
- Introduced by: Frank Soskice, Home Secretary (Commons); Lord Stonham (Lords)
- Territorial extent: England and Wales; Scotland; (Note: Section 8(3).)

Dates
- Royal assent: 8 November 1965
- Commencement: 8 December 1965 (Note: Section 8(2).)
- Repealed: 22 November 1976
Other legislation
| Amends | Public Order Act 1936; House of Commons Disqualification Act 1957 |
| Amended by | Race Relations Act 1968 |
| Repealed by | Race Relations Act 1976 |

Status: Repealed

Text of statute as originally enacted

The Race Relations Act 1965 (c. 73) was an act of the Parliament of the United Kingdom. The act was the first legislation in the United Kingdom to address racial discrimination.

The act outlawed discrimination on the "grounds of colour, race, or ethnic or national origins" in public places in Great Britain.

It also prompted the creation of the Race Relations Board in 1966. This would consist of a chairman and two other members appointed by the Secretary of State. Its remit was to consider complaints under the Act.

== Background ==
=== Reasons for the act's introduction ===
The UK saw an influx of economic migrants after World War II, many from British colonies or former colonies; those from the Caribbean are known as the Windrush generation. By the time the 1965 bill was introduced, there was a population of almost a million immigrants living in Britain. The Museum of London states that "casual 'colour prejudice' was part of daily life" for many. Between 1951 and 1964, a dozen attempts were made to legislate racial discrimination. The left-wing Member of Parliament Fenner Brockway had introduced a bill to put a stop to racial discrimination eight times from 1956 to 1964. In 1958, London saw the Notting Hill riots, and in 1963 the Bristol Bus Boycott occurred.

=== Exclusion of Northern Ireland ===
The Government of Northern Ireland successfully lobbied the Government of the United Kingdom for Northern Ireland to be excluded from the territorial extent of the Race Relations Act 1965 and for religion to excluded from being considered a "racial" criterion.

== Outline ==
The act was drafted by Home Secretary Frank Soskice with some cross-party cooperation.

The bill was given royal assent on 8 November 1965 and began to be enforced on 8 December. The act made it a civil offence (rather than a criminal offence) to refuse to serve a person, to serve someone with unreasonable delay, or to overcharge, on the grounds of colour, race, or ethnic or national origins. The Act also created the offence of "incitement to racial hatred".

The first conviction under the act came in October 1967, when a 17-year-old member of the National Socialist Party was found guilty of racial discrimination at Middlesex Area Sessions. The leader of the British National Socialist Movement, Colin Jordan, was also successfully prosecuted under the Act and jailed for 18 months in 1967.

Black immigrants were also tried for this offence, including Black Power leader Michael Abdul Malik (Michael X) and four members of the Universal Coloured People's Association for "stirring up racial hatred against white people."

== Limitations ==
The act specifically excluded shops and private boarding houses, only outlawing discrimination in "places of public resort." The Race Relations Board was rather weak in its enforcement capabilities, being limited to conciliation and an assurance not to return to the discriminatory behavior. It was "a weak piece of legislation" and failed to end racial discrimination in the UK fully.

The act did not apply in Northern Ireland.

== Amendment and repeal ==
The act was strengthened with the Race Relations Act 1968, which extended the legislation's remit to cover employment and housing. It was repealed by the Race Relations Act 1976, which saw the creation of the Commission for Racial Equality.

== See also ==
- UK employment discrimination law
- Racism in the United Kingdom
