= North Camp =

Suburb of Farnborough, in Hampshire, England

Coordinates: 51.28°N 0.75°W

- Location within Hampshire
- District: Rushmoor
- Shire county: Hampshire
- Region: South East
- Country: England
- Sovereign state: United Kingdom
- Post town: FARNBOROUGH
- Postcode district: GU14
- Dialling code: 01252
- Police: Hampshire and Isle of Wight
- Fire: Hampshire and Isle of Wight
- Ambulance: South East Coast
- UK Parliament: Aldershot

North Camp is a suburb of Farnborough, in Hampshire, England. It adjoins the military town of Aldershot, as part of the Farnborough/Aldershot built-up area.

== History ==
The British Army first came to the barren heathland of Aldershot in 1854. It proved to be an ideal military base, close to London and Portsmouth. Aldershot Garrison was divided into the North Camp and the South Camp, either side of the Basingstoke Canal, hence the suburb's name.

== Amenities ==
North Camp has several retail outlets, including a motorcycle shop, specialist food and clothes shops.

The nearby town centres of Farnborough and Aldershot have much larger shopping areas.

== Transport ==
North Camp railway station lies in nearby Ash Vale; it is a stop on the North Downs Line. Great Western Railway operates a general off-peak weekday service of two trains per hour between Reading and Gatwick Airport, via Guildford and Redhill.

Stagecoach South operates Gold bus route 1 between Aldershot, Farnborough and Old Dean in Camberley; it also runs three school routes through North Camp serving All Hallows Catholic School in Weybourne.

The main roads within North Camp include:

- A325 links North Camp to Farnborough and Aldershot
- A3011 (Lynchford Road), which leads towards Ash Vale and Mytchett
- A331 borders the area, which leads to Guildford and Sandhurst.
