= Stagecoach South bus route 1 =

Bus route in southern England

1
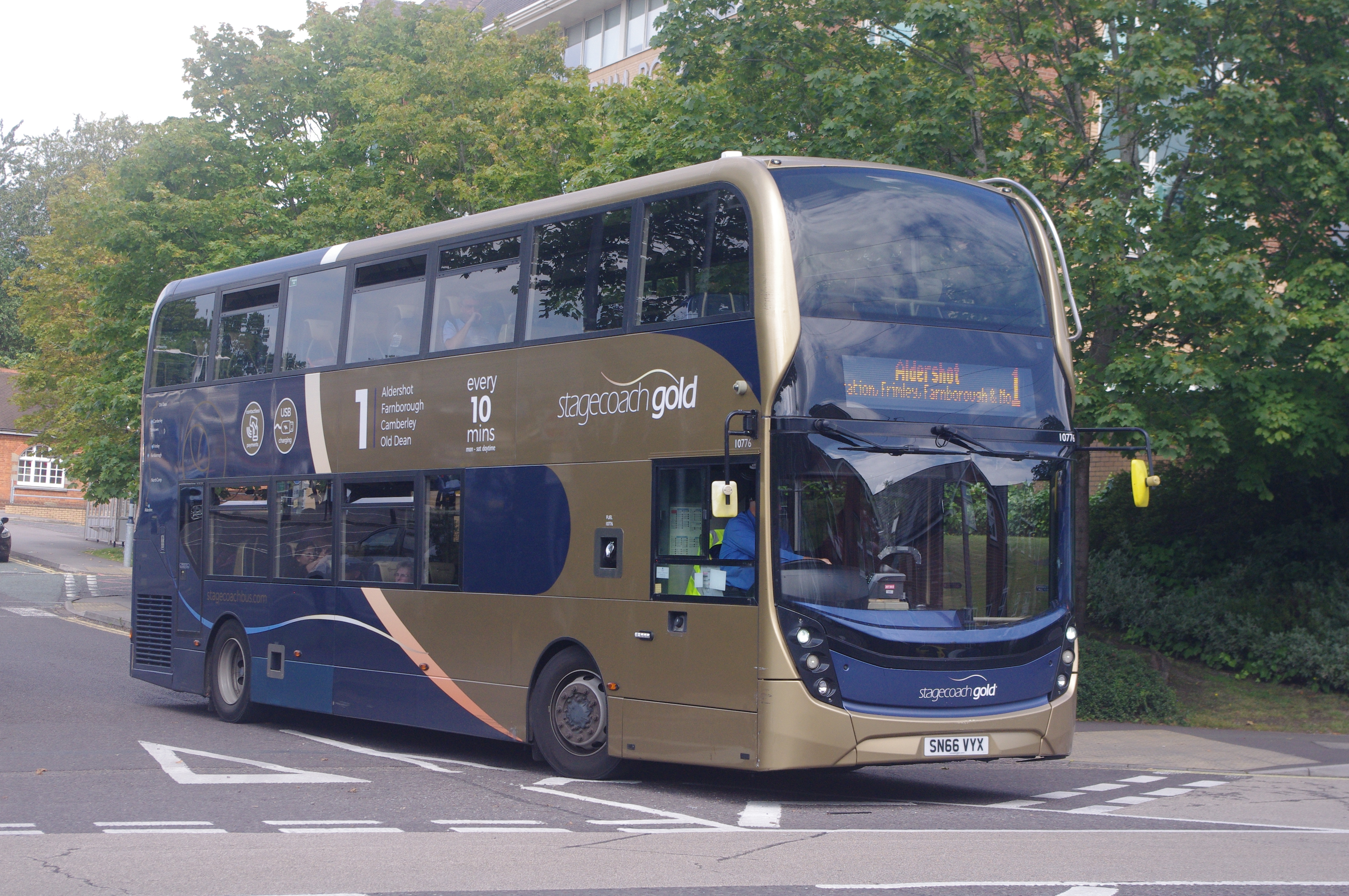
- Stagecoach Gold Enviro400 MMC 10776 at Farnborough in September 2023.

Overview
- Operator: Stagecoach South
- Garage: Aldershot
- Vehicle: Yutong U11DD

Route
- Start: Aldershot
- Via: North Camp; Farnborough; Frimley; Frimley Park Hospital (early morning and late evening); Camberley
- End: Old Dean

Service
- Level: Daily
- Frequency: Up to 12 minutes
- Operates: 04:30 - 00:20
- Timetable: 1 timetable

Stagecoach South bus route 1 is a bus route in southern England that links Camberley and Frimley in Surrey and Farnborough and Aldershot in Hampshire. The service is run by Stagecoach South.

== History ==
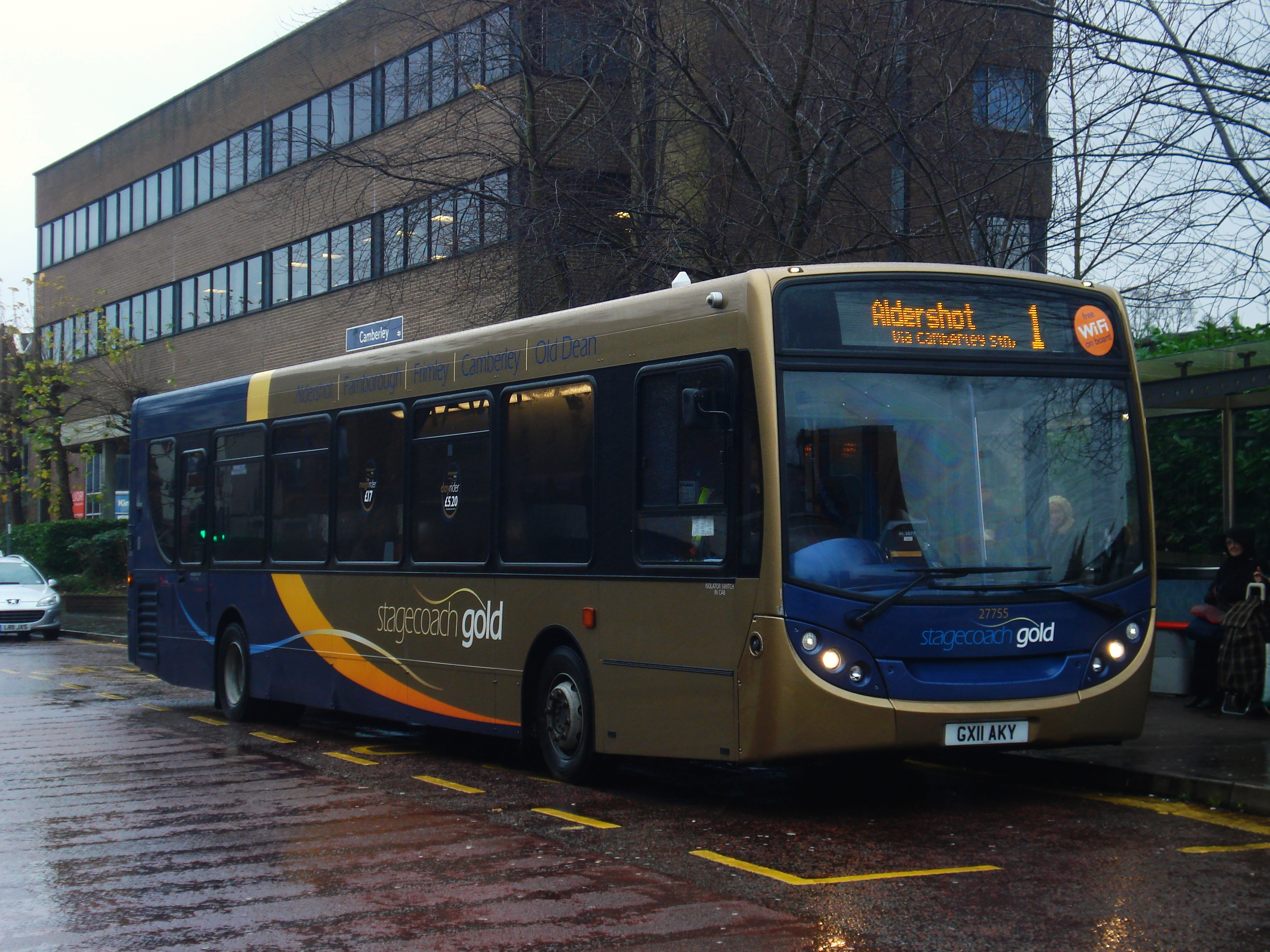
Stagecoach South Alexander Dennis Enviro 300 at Camberley station in December 2013

The first bus journeys between Aldershot and Farnborough were established by the Aldershot & Farnborough Motor Omnibus Company Limited (A&FMOCL) in 1906, which ran half-hourly services through the military camp, following the closure of a short-lived tramway. Five journeys on this route were extended to Camberley via Frimley and Yorktown on 19 June 1913.

In 1912, the A&FMOCL was purchased by the British Automobile Traction Company, and hereon the company became the Aldershot & District Traction Company (nicknamed Tracco).

In June 1919, A&D's existing routes were allocated letters in the public timetables, to which the Aldershot-Camberley service became the route F. However, this was quickly changed to adopting numbers in 1920, to which the route F became the route 1. When extended to Sunningdale and Egham by 1921, regular short workings of longer routes required separate numbers, leading to the short workings of the 1 becoming routes 2 (Aldershot-Camberley) and 3 (Aldershot-Farnborough).

The outbreak of the Second World War saw emergency timetables introduced on all routes at the end of 1939, and the route 1 was cut back to Sunningdale, re-extending to Egham from 29 September 1942 following the temporary ceasing of the company's express coach services.

By the 1950s, the route 1 formed part of the Aldershot-Camberley bus corridor which had a bus at every eight minutes.

Upon grouping into the National Bus Company, in 1972 the Aldershot & District merged with Thames Valley Traction to become Alder Valley. To avoid confusion with the Thames Valley routes, former A&D services were entirely renumbered on 29 September 1974, often increasing digits by 200, which saw the routes 1, 2 and 3 become 201, 202 and 203.

With declining passenger numbers since the 1950s, a detailed study of the bus services in the "Blackwater Valley area" was carried out in the mid-1970s, the outcome being a major re-casting of the network, taking effect on 4 September 1977, which saw the 201 altered to run between Basingstoke and Heathrow Airport. On top of this, local bus routes were renumbered once again into the 400-series, routes 202 and 203 (former "short journeys" 2 and 3) becoming the 442 and 443, which were left serving the original Aldershot-Camberley corridor.

Following deregulation in 1986, while continuing to be operated by Alder Valley, the company registered new commercial services to take over the existing routes. When Stagecoach South took over the Alder Valley operations on 26 October 1992, the route's proximity fell under the Hants & Surrey subsidiary.

The 1 number was reintroduced in January 1997, forming from parts of routes 17, 19 and 20/20A, and ran at a 20 minute frequency to connect Yateley, Camberley, Frimley, Farnborough and Aldershot. As the former Alder Valley name was subsequently renamed as the Blackwater Valley, the route 1 was dubbed The Blackwater Valley Link.

On 29 October 2001, local county and borough councils entered into a quality partnership with Stagecoach to improve bus services in the Blackwater Valley area, with the route 1 being a major route to benefit from the partnership. The first phase of bus priority measures were proposed in Farnborough, including new bus lanes, bus priority traffic signals, bus shelters, special raised kerbing and more frequent services. Phase 1 commenced in October 2002, with main section of the works being completed in September 2003. Further bus priority measures were proposed in Aldershot, Blackwater, Camberley, Frimley and Yateley, tackling unreliability.

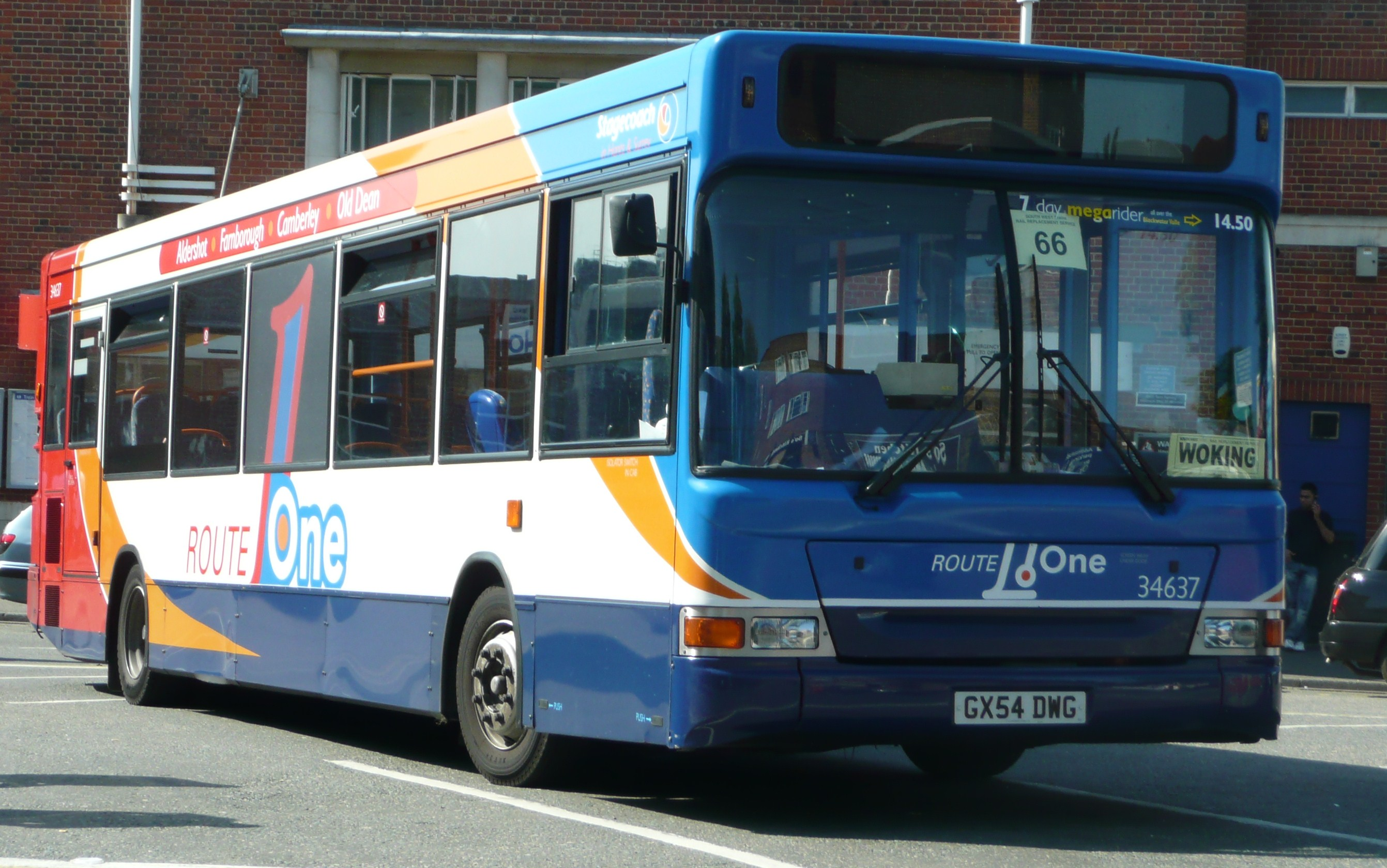
Stagecoach in Hants & Surrey Plaxton Pointer 2-bodied Dennis Dart advertising route 1, seen in 2008.

In September 2002, low-floor buses were introduced on all Route 1 journeys, a total investment of £600,000 by Stagecoach. Subsequently, a fleet of Plaxton Pointer-bodied Dennis Dart SLFs were introduced with route branding for the 1 in 2004.

Commencing 13 April 2003, the route was diverted to serve the Old Dean Estate instead of Yateley, but the frequency was increased to every 15 minutes on Monday to Saturdays and every 30 minutes on Sundays. Furthermore, all routes throughout the 'route 1 corridor' carried the number 1, except for additional school journeys.

The route 1 was upgraded to Goldline status on 9 February 2009, which the brand was later renamed as Stagecoach Gold, and received new Alexander Dennis Enviro 300s. This investment was subsequently boosted in 2011 after two additional buses joined the fleet and extra peak journeys enhanced the frequency from 10 minutes to every 7-8 minutes.

In August 2013, Saturday evening services were temporarily suspended after multiple incidents of stones were being thrown at buses on the route, resulting in a passenger receiving injuries.

In 2016, Stagecoach reviewed the route to identify opportunities for improvements, which included the suggestion to split the service at Camberley town centre to improve reliability. Later that year, an investment of £4.5 million saw 18 new Alexander Dennis Enviro400 MMC double-deck buses introduced on the route 1.

On 28 July 2019, route 1 began to run 24-hour services on the route as part of a £25 million funding by the local enterprise partnership, however this was temporarily suspended from 2020 as a result of the COVID-19 outbreak. Stagecoach also ran the route 1 with a half-hourly service on Christmas Day in 2019.

A proposal to implement a new bus lane along Alexandra Road in North Camp was raised in 2021. The works were completed in 2023.

From 4 January 2022, in light of the national shortage of bus drivers, route 1's frequency was reduced to every 12 minutes.

When Stagecoach buses ceased terminating at Aldershot Bus Station after 7 May 2023, having been served since 1997, the route 1's terminus stand moved to Union Yard, opposite new redevelopment of Aldershot's town centre.

From summer 2026, new Yutong U11DD double-deck buses will be introduced on the route 1 as part of an investment into zero-emission buses with funding contributed by Surrey County Council.

== Route ==
The route 1 starts at Aldershot town centre, promptly travelling through the Aldershot Military Camp, passing by the Military Stadium and Military Museum upon departure. Reaching North Camp, a district of Farnborough, it travels via Alexandra Road. At the Farnborough College of Technology, the route 1 travels along a short section of the A325, turning off to stop at the Kingsmead bus station, adjacent to the shopping name of the same name. Buses on this route usually wait there for a few minutes to allow interchange between other non-Gold branded Stagecoach South buses.

Upon departure of Farnborough, the route 1 rejoins the A325 for another short section before making a short double-run to the Main Rail Station. Returning to the A325, it follows the road up to the Blackwater Shopping Park (colloquially known as Farnborough Gate), where it avoids the bypass, travels past Frimley railway station and through the High Street. The route 1 then joins the B3411 (Frimley Road) to travel up to Yorktown, a district of Camberley, with some evening and overnight journeys make a double-run to Frimley Park Hospital prior to the B3411 section. It turns right onto the A30 London Road, then onto Charles Street, adjacent to The Atrium shopping centre. Subsequently travelling past Camberley railway station, the route 1 crosses the A30 to follow the trunk road (Kings Ride, College Ride, Upper College Ride) that leads to a turning circle near Collingwood College.

The total off-peak journey time in either direction between Old Dean and Aldershot is about an hour.

== Service frequency ==
Services run throughout the day with frequencies up to every 12 minutes on Monday to Fridays. There are early morning (until 5:30am) and late evening (usually after 8pm) journeys that run via Frimley Park Hospital, which other Stagecoach buses serve in the daytime. At weekends, the service runs at every 15 minutes.
