= Stagecoach Gold =

Brand of premium bus services in the United Kingdom by Stagecoach

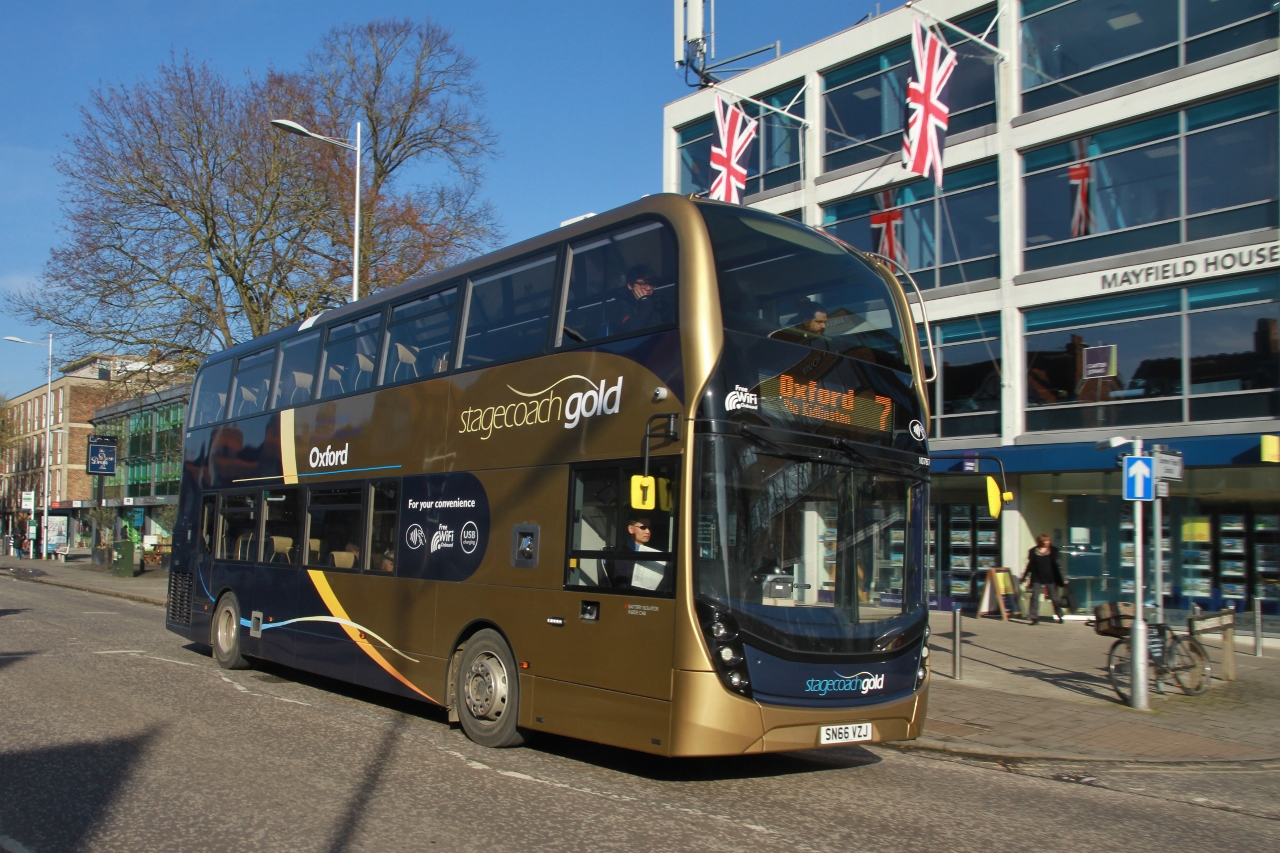
- Stagecoach in Oxfordshire Gold-branded Alexander Dennis Enviro400 MMC operating route 7 in Oxford
- Parent: Stagecoach
- Founded: November 2007
- Service type: Luxury bus
- Routes: 49
- Fleet: Alexander Dennis Enviro300 (Integral, MAN 18.240, Scania K230UB); Alexander Dennis Enviro400 (Scania N230UD); Alexander Dennis Enviro200 MMC (Integral); Alexander Dennis Enviro400 MMC (Integral, Scania N250UD)
- Operator: Stagecoach East; Stagecoach East Kent; Stagecoach East Scotland; Stagecoach Cumbria & North Lancashire; Stagecoach Merseyside & South Lancashire; Stagecoach Midlands; Stagecoach South; Stagecoach South Wales; Stagecoach South West; Stagecoach West; Stagecoach Yorkshire
- Website: www.stagecoachgold.com

Stagecoach Gold was a luxury bus sub-brand used by various Stagecoach bus subsidiaries in the United Kingdom.

Stagecoach Gold (originally Goldline) was launched in 2007 and was designed to attract more middle-class passengers to choose bus travel as a method of transport as well as to reward passengers on some busy and popular routes.

Stagecoach West currently runs the most Stagecoach Gold routes, nine, as of August 2022. Stagecoach Midlands owns the largest number of Stagecoach Gold branded vehicles with 63 in its fleet as of August, 2023.

As part of a makeover of its UK business, work began in February 2020 on the removal of Gold branding in some cases by withdrawal of the routes or transferring services to other operators.

== History ==
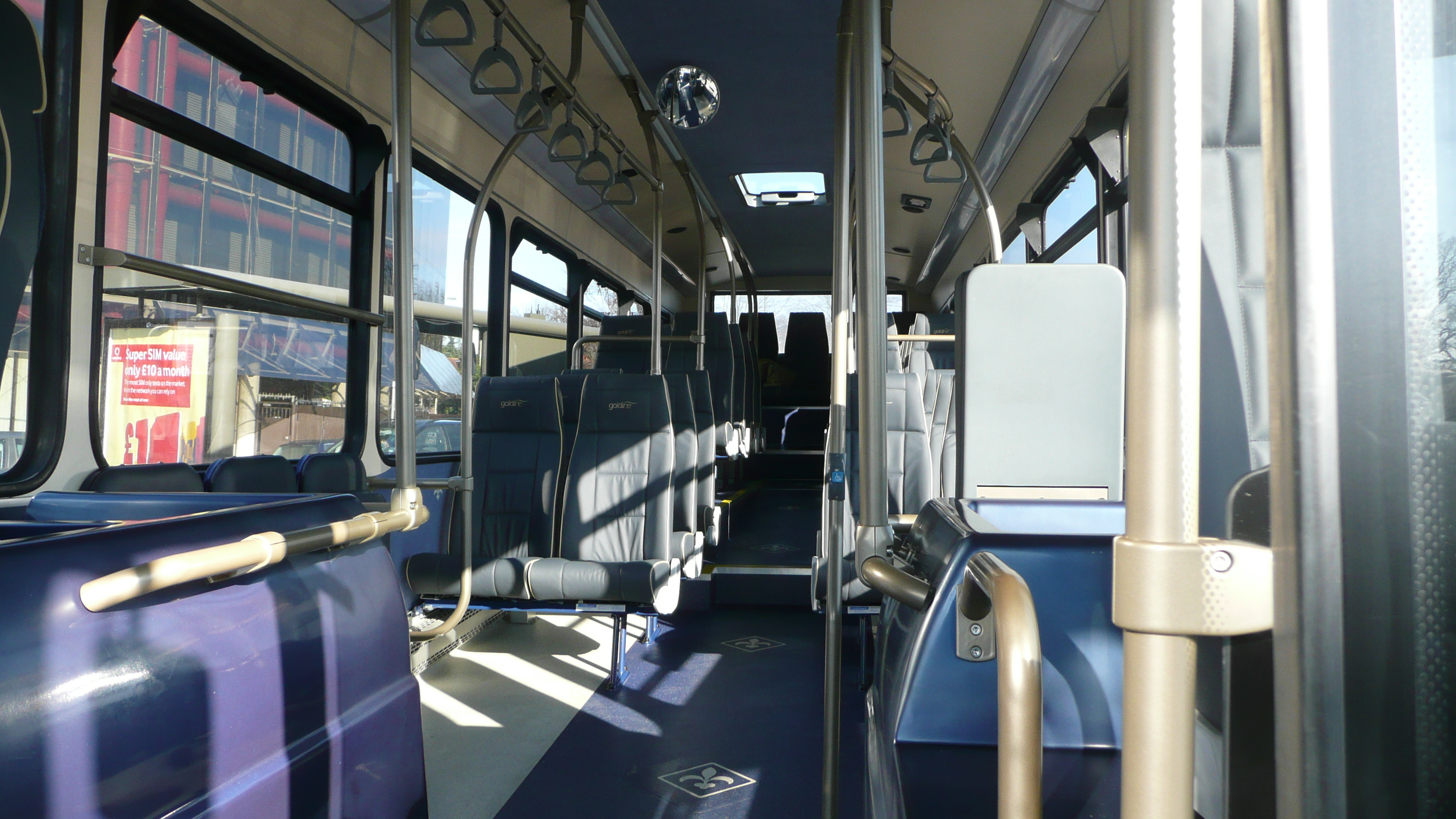
Interior of a Stagecoach South Alexander Dennis Enviro300 bodied MAN 18.240 in February 2009

The original Stagecoach Goldline logo, replaced in 2009 by the current branding

The Goldline brand was introduced to try to win more middle-class motorists to bus services. The brand was initially trialled in both Perth, using Alexander Dennis Enviro300 single-deck buses, and Warwick, using Optare Solo midibuses, from November 2007, both on routes which received Kickstart funding from the Department for Transport to help establish the routes. Stagecoach East Scotland invested £300,000 to demonstrate the idea to politicians.

Goldline routes have a luxury specification. Buses have hand-stitched leather seats, metallic paint, special flooring and free WiFi. Drivers wear a special uniform and there is a Goldline customer charter.

In February 2009 the service was expanded to Aldershot and in September 2009 to Cheltenham and Gloucester on route 94. At this stage the brand name changed from Goldline to Stagecoach Gold, as well as the introduction of a new livery with brighter swoops added, as opposed to the previous gold and blue only livery. The reason behind the name change was that Translink had the rights to the Goldline name, using it on their Ulsterbus coach services, and Stagecoach had to pay Translink a royalty.

In 2010, the Stagecoach Gold brand was extended to services run by Scottish Citylink, where Stagecoach have a 35% shareholding, where the Glasgow to Aberdeen and Glasgow to Inverness services were designated as Citylink Gold.

In 2015, all brand new Stagecoach Gold vehicles came equipped with USB charging facilities underneath every seat which enabled passengers to charge their mobile devices whilst on board. USB charging first became available on the Stagecoach in Oxfordshire S4 service which was upgraded to Stagecoach Gold in September 2015.

As of 2016, all brand new Stagecoach buses, including non-gold vehicles, come equipped with high back leather seats, USB charging facilities and many with free onboard Wi-Fi. Subsequently, this means that many of Stagecoach's new non-gold vehicles are now at the same specification as the Gold branded vehicles. As a result, some non-gold routes now have higher specification vehicles than many of the Gold routes as prior to 2015, Stagecoach Gold vehicles did not come equipped with USB charging facilities.

2016 also saw Stagecoach take delivery of the first Stagecoach Gold branded Alexander Dennis Enviro400 MMC and Enviro200 MMC vehicles. The liveries on the new vehicles remain the same as the previous models; however, Stagecoach have slightly modified the interior upholstery with new style leather seats that incorporate a cream-coloured headrest as well as new wood effect flooring.

== Routes ==
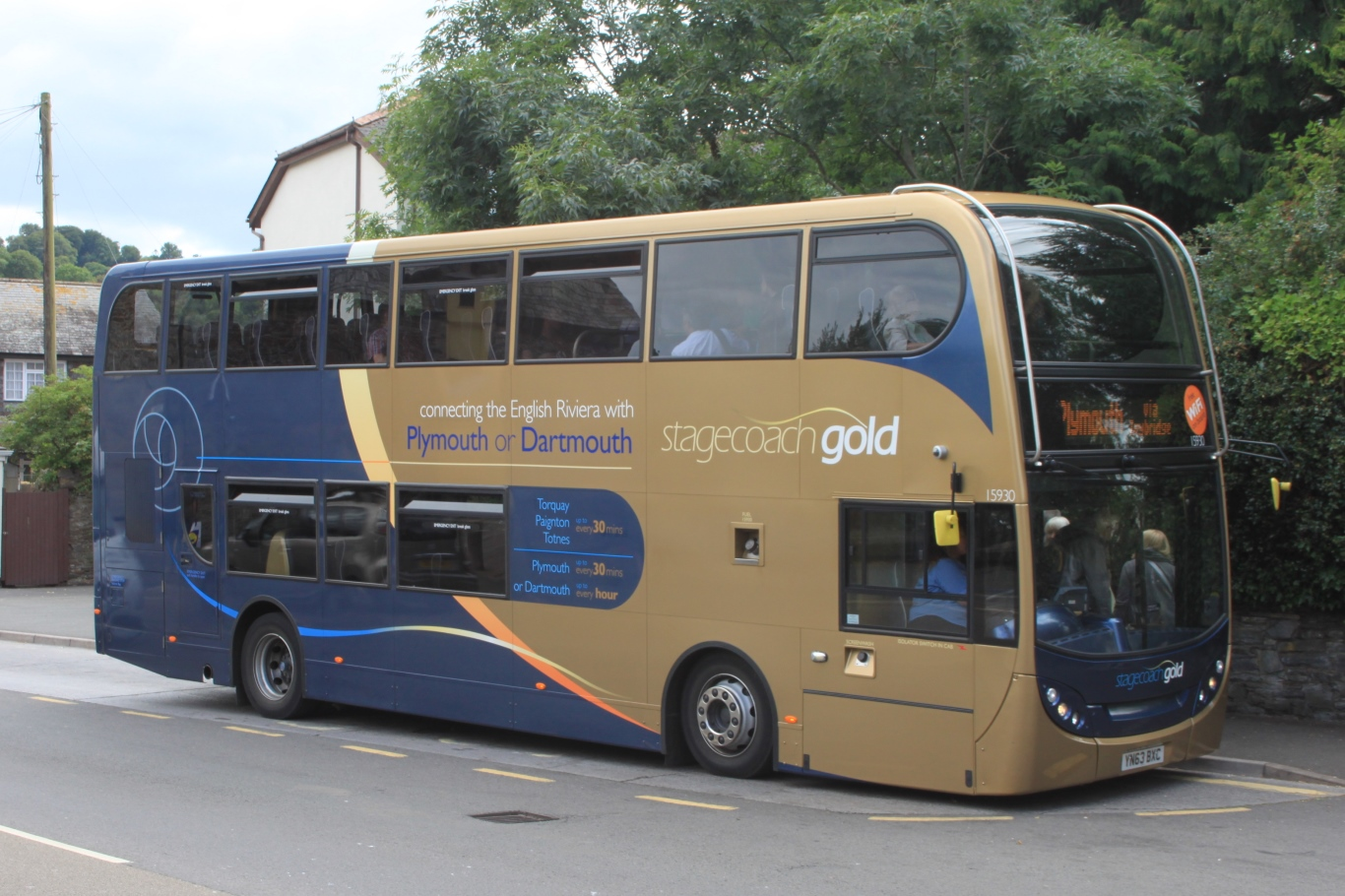
Stagecoach South West Alexander Dennis Enviro400 bodied Scania N230UD in Totnes in July 2014

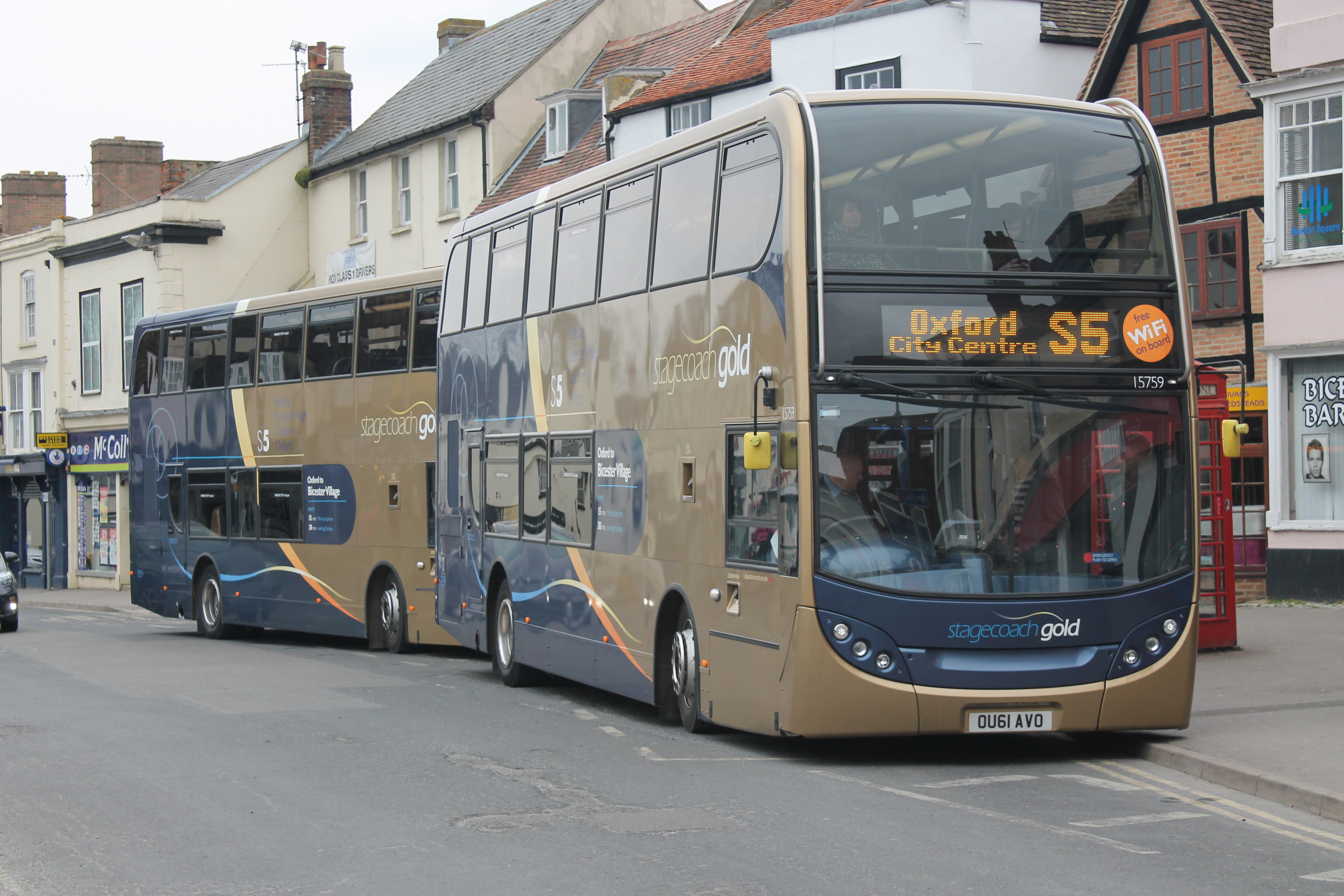
Two Stagecoach West Alexander Dennis Enviro400 bodied Scania N230UDs in Bicester on route S5 in April 2013

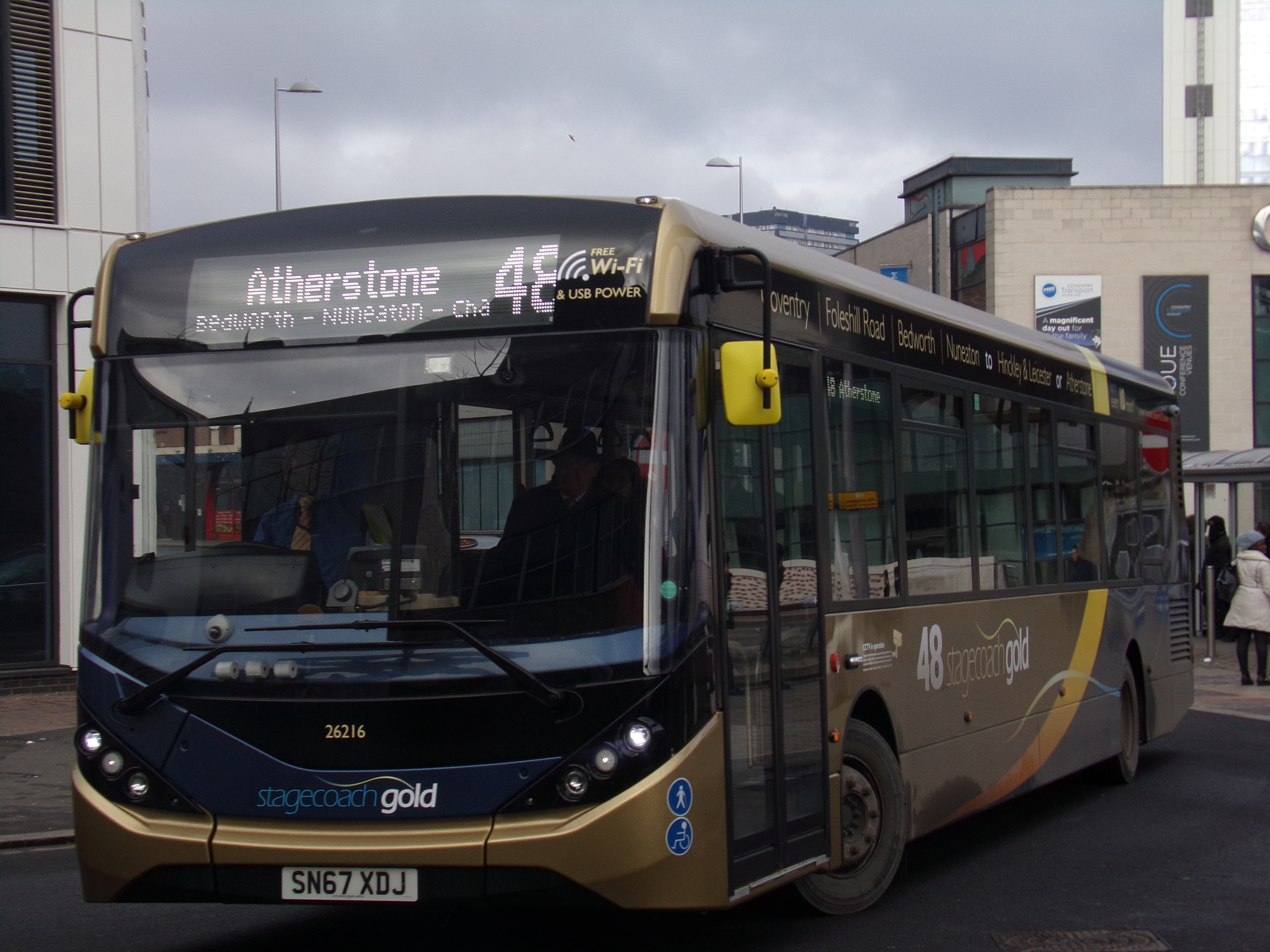
Stagecoach Midlands Gold branded Alexander Dennis Enviro200 MMC

As of October 2025, there were 26 Stagecoach Gold routes (including night services).

No./Name	Route start	Route end	Refs
Stagecoach West
55	Chippenham	Swindon	
S3/NS3	Chipping Norton/Charlbury	Oxford	
S5/NS5	Bicester	Oxford	
S6	Swindon	Oxford	
S7	Witney	Oxford	
S9/NS9	Wantage	Oxford	
Stagecoach South
1 and 34	Aldershot	Old Dean	
Stagecoach Merseyside & South Lancashire
471/472	Heswall	Liverpool	
Stagecoach South East
16	Hythe	Canterbury	
Stagecoach Midlands
X4	Peterborough	Northampton	
X46/X47	Northampton	Raunds	
Stagecoach Cumbria & North Lancashire
300/301	Carlisle	Whitehaven	
Stagecoach Yorkshire
50/50A	Chesterfield	Sheffield	
Stagecoach South Wales
1/2/5/6/7	Cwmbran		
26	Blackwood	Cardiff	
132	Maerdy	Cardiff	
151	Blackwood	Newport	
X24	Blaenavon	Newport	

== Other routes ==
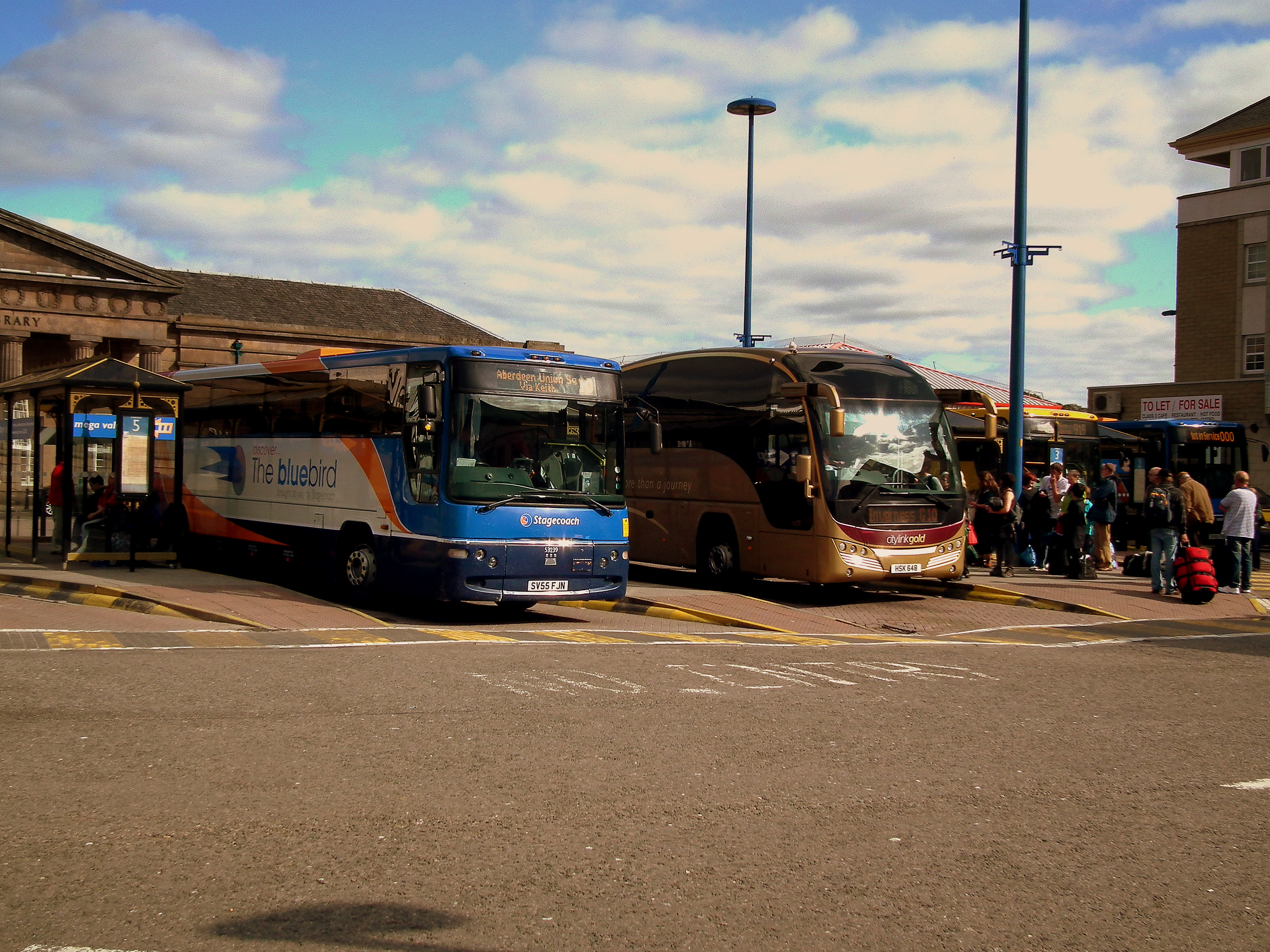
Scottish Citylink Plaxton Elite bodied Volvo B12M (right) at Inverness bus station in September 2011

No./Name	Route start	Route end	Refs
Scottish Citylink
G9	Glasgow	Aberdeen	
G10	Glasgow	Inverness	

== Former routes ==
Route Number	Route	Operator	Notes
Gold	Plymouth - Torquay - Totnes - Dartmouth	Stagecoach South West	Gold status removed due to service splitting.: Totnes - Dartmouth section replaced by service 92.; Plymouth to Torquay section remembered to the 80.
1/X1	Liverpool - Chester	Stagecoach Merseyside & South Lancashire	Gold status removed due to service rebranding.
5	Chester - Huntington/Wrexham	Stagecoach Merseyside & South Lancashire	Gold status removed due to service rebranding.
7	Scone - Hillend	Stagecoach East Scotland	Gold status removed.
9	Chester - Piper's Ash	Stagecoach Merseyside & South Lancashire	Gold status removed due to service rebranding.
10	Lower Tuffley - Cheltenham	Stagecoach West	Gold status removed due to service rebranding.
13	Cambridge - Haverhill	Stagecoach East	Gold status removed.
38	West Kirby - Eastham Ferry	Stagecoach Merseyside & South Lancashire	Gold status removed due to service rebranding.
48	Coventry - Nuneaton - Atherstone - Leicester	Stagecoach Midlands	Service split into 48A, 48C and 48L in 2020 but retains gold status
48C	Nuneaton - Coventry	Stagecoach Midlands	Merged back together as 148 between Coventry & Leicester
48A	Nuneaton - Atherstone	Stagecoach Midlands	Merged back together as 148 between Coventry & Leicester
48L	Nuneaton - Leicester	Stagecoach Midlands	Merged back together as 148 between Coventry & Leicester
51	Selsey - Chichester	Stagecoach South	Gold status removed due to service rebranding.
57/N57	Exeter - Exmouth	Stagecoach South West	Gold status removed due to service rebranding.
63	Forest Green - Gloucester	Stagecoach West	Gold status removed due to service rebranding.
66	Cheltenham/Stroud/Dursley - Gloucester	Stagecoach West	Gold status removed due to route changes and low passenger usage.
93	Arle Court P&R - Cheltenham Town Centre	Stagecoach West	Gold status removed, then service was withdrawn.
94/94X/N94	Cheltenham - Gloucester	Stagecoach West	Gold Status removed due to the introduction of electric buses.
97/98	Cheltenham - Gloucester	Stagecoach West	Gold status removed due to service rebranding.
120/130	Blaencwm - Caerphilly	Stagecoach South Wales	Gold status removed.
125	Preston - Bolton	Stagecoach Merseyside & South Lancashire	Gold status removed due to service rebranding.
148	Coventry - Leicester	Stagecoach Midlands	Gold status removed due to the introduction of electric buses.
G1	Warwick - South Farm	Stagecoach Midlands	Service withdrawn. Replaced by service 1.
S1/S2/NS1	Carterton/Witney - Oxford	Stagecoach West	Gold status removed due to service rebranding.
S4/H4	Banbury - Oxford/JR Hospital	Stagecoach West	Gold status removed due to vehicle reshuffle.
S7	Carterton - Oxford/Headington	Stagecoach West	Gold status removed due to low passenger usage and route being discontinued.
S8/NS8/34	Wantage/Harwell Campus - Oxford	Stagecoach West	Gold status removed due to an operator change to Thames Travel.
SW1	Carterton - London	Stagecoach West	Service withdrawn in May 2015 due to low passenger numbers.
Severn Express	Bristol - Newport	Stagecoach West	Service withdrawn in June 2020 due to low passenger numbers.
X4/X5	Workington - Penrith	Stagecoach Cumbria & North Lancashire	Gold status removed due to service rebranding.
X5	Cribbs Causeway - Weston-super-Mare	Stagecoach West	Service withdrawn in June 2020 due to low passenger numbers.
X14	Cribbs Causeway - Chepstow	Stagecoach West	Service withdrawn in June 2020 due to low passenger numbers.
X17	Barnsley - Wirksworth	Stagecoach Yorkshire	Gold status removed due to the introduction of electric buses.
X46	Exeter - Paignton	Stagecoach South West	Service withdrawn due to low passenger numbers.

== See also ==
- Arriva Max
- Arriva Sapphire
