= X5 =

X5 or X-5 may refer to:

== Businesses and organizations ==
- X5 Music Group, a record label based in Sweden
- X5 Retail, formerly the largest retailer in Russia

== Electronics ==
- GE X5, a bridge digital camera
- iAUDIO X5, a portable digital audio player
- Korg X5, a synthesizer
- Nokia X5, a mobile telephone
- Pentax X-5, a digital superzoom camera
- Sony Xperia X5 Pureness, a mobile telephone

== Media ==
=== Characters ===
- X-5, a character from the animated television series Atomic Betty
- X5, a group of super-soldiers in the television series Dark Angel

=== Video games ===
- Mega Man X5, the fifth game in the Mega Man X series

== Technology ==
- X Five, a gene-sequencing machine in the HiSeq series produced by the San Diego–based biotech firm Illumina
- Xitami X5, an open-source Web server

== Transportation ==
=== Air transportation ===
- Bell X-5, an experimental aircraft
- X5, the IATA code for Afrique Airlines

=== Automobiles ===
- BMW X5, a 1999–present German mid-size SUV
- Cowin X5, a 2017–2021 Chinese compact SUV
- Domy X5, a 2015–2018 Chinese compact SUV
- Forthing Jingyi X5, a 2013–2021 Chinese compact crossover
- Hanteng X5, a 2016–2022 Chinese compact SUV
- Landwind X5, a 2012–2020 Chinese compact SUV
- Beijing X5, a 2015–present Chinese compact SUV
- Oshan X5, a 2020–present Chinese compact SUV
- Rely X5, a 2010–2011 Chinese compact SUV

=== Bus services ===
- Stagecoach X5, a bus service between Oxford and Bedford (previously Cambridge), England
- X5 (New York City bus)
- X5 Bristol–Weston-super-Mare, a bus service in England

=== Trains ===
- SJ X5, a Swedish trainset

== See also ==
- 5X (disambiguation)
