= Stagecoach South =

Bus operator providing services in South East England

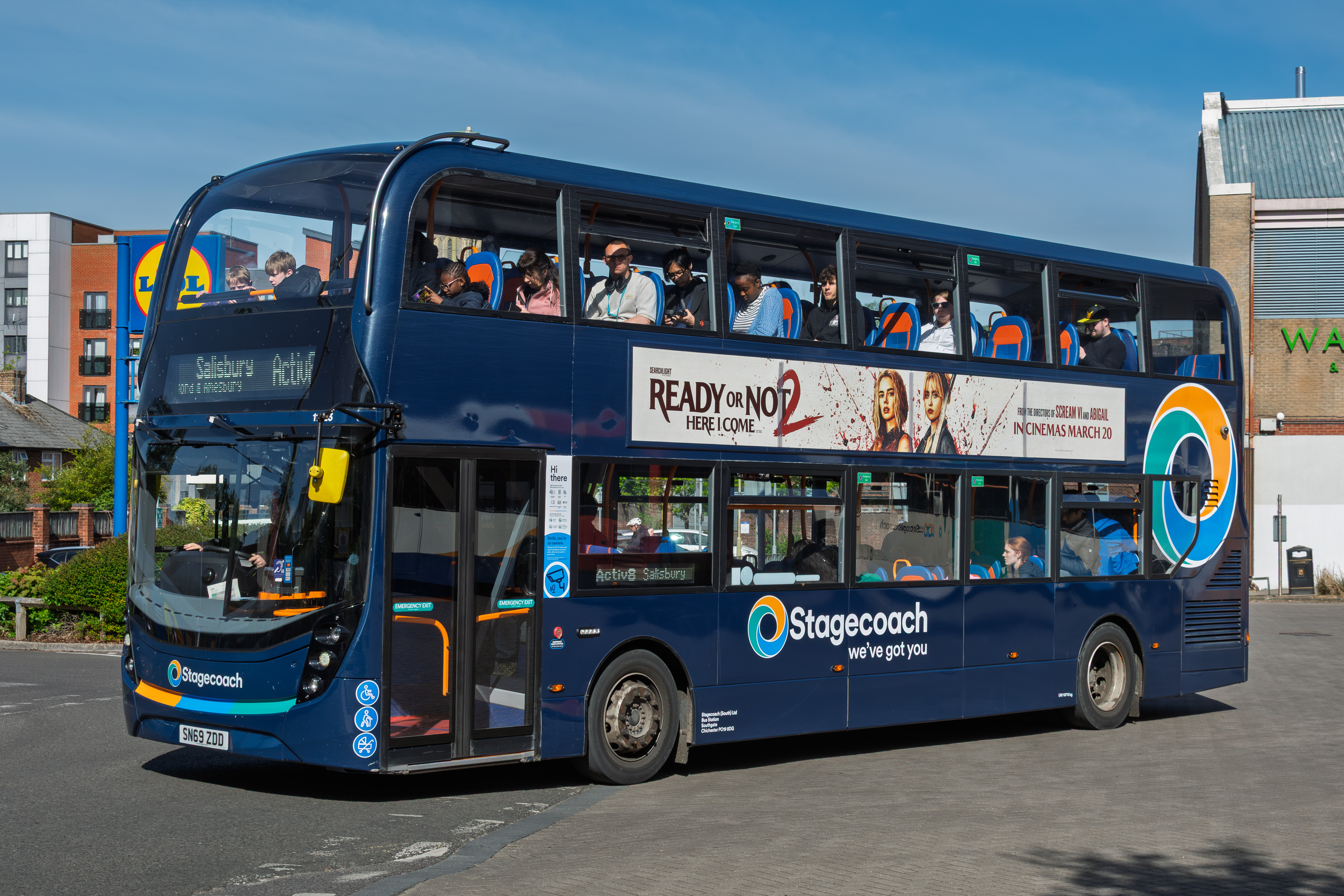
- Alexander Dennis Enviro400 MMC in Andover in June 2026
- Parent: Stagecoach
- Headquarters: Chichester
- Service area: South East England
- Service type: Bus services
- Routes: 152 (April 2019)
- Depots: 8
- Fleet: 487 (April 2019)
- Annual ridership: 40 million (April 2019)
- Manager: Marc Reddy
- Website: www.stagecoachbus.com/about/south

Stagecoach (South) Limited, trading as Stagecoach South, is a bus operator providing services in South East England as a subsidiary of Stagecoach. It operates services in Hampshire, Surrey, and Sussex with some routes extending into Brighton, Wiltshire and Berkshire. It operates 487 buses from eight depots.

It is branded as four sub-divisions: Stagecoach in Hampshire, Stagecoach in Hants & Surrey, Stagecoach in the South Downs, and Stagecoach in Portsmouth.

A common feature of this division was the large number of branded routes, usually with dedicated names in lieu of numbers. These were largely reverted to numbers in the 2020s.

== Stagecoach in Hampshire ==
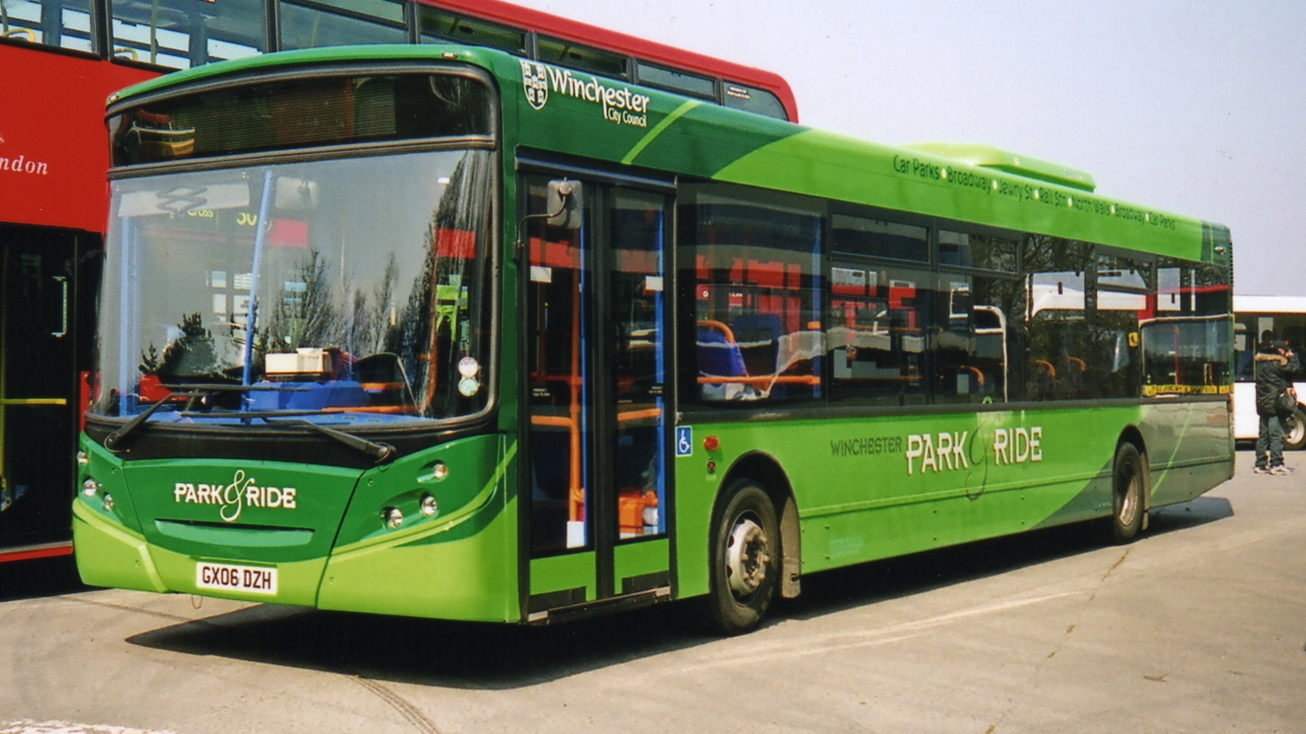
Stagecoach's Alexander Dennis Enviro 300 in Winchester P&R livery in 2007

Stagecoach in Hampshire, formerly known as Hampshire Bus, operates from depots in Andover, Basingstoke and Winchester. It was the first former National Bus Company subsidiary to be purchased by Stagecoach in 1987, the Hampshire Bus name continuing until the early 2000s.

In 2015, Stagecoach unveiled £2.5 million investment in new Alexander Dennis Enviro200 MMC buses for Winchester park and ride services, featuring a gold and purple livery, inspired by King Alfred the Great.

In 2017, Stagecoach launched six new Alexander Dennis Enviro400 MMC buses for the route 64 to Alton, which also received extra journeys in evenings and Sundays, the unveiling taking place at the Winchester Science Centre.

In December 2019, 32 new Enviro200 MMCs were introduced to Basingstoke, representing a £5.3 million investment.

== Stagecoach in Hants & Surrey ==
Stagecoach in Hants & Surrey operates from depots in Aldershot and in Peasmarsh, just outside of Guildford. Since 2022 it has also operated from the former Arriva depot in Guildford. It is made up of Alder Valley's remaining operations, taken over by Stagecoach on 26 October 1992. The company operates a number of routes across Hampshire and Surrey, serving Aldershot, Camberley, Farnborough, Godalming, and Guildford.

In 2002, a number 22 Stagecoach bus, operating a journey from Aldershot to the Old Dean estate, was hijacked by two armed men.

On 9 February 2009, the route 1 was upgraded to Goldline status with 14 new Enviro300 vehicles.

Following the Countryliner bus company entering administration, in October 2012 Stagecoach took back route 46 that it lost in the last tendering round the previous month, as well as Surrey County Council school routes on an emergency basis until July 2013.

Stagecoach stepped in to take control of the route 94 between Bracknell and Camberley, after First Beeline proposed to close its bus depot in Bracknell and withdraw most of its services in the area from Saturday 29 August 2015. However, the company later withdrew the service from 12 March 2016 over its loss-making nature.

Stagecoach South opened a new depot at Peasmarsh in October 2015, which oversaw the relocation of several south Surrey bus routes from Aldershot and Haslemere to the new depot.

On 31 December 2016, Stagecoach took over Abellio Surrey's former route 515 (running between Guildford and Kingston upon Thames) following the company's departure from Surrey operations, renumbering it as the 715 in homage to the former Green Line Coaches route that ran on the same section. To launch the new route, a heritage AEC Routemaster bus ran duplicate journeys, provided by the London Bus Museum. The 715 was later passed to Falcon Buses from 26 August 2023 following tender changes.

After the takeover of Fleet Buzz, the Hants & Surrey division maintained a presence in Reading until 16 April 2018, when the route 7 was split and Reading Buses took over the northern section to Fleet. As part of the deal, two Stagecoach vehicles were sold to Reading Buses.

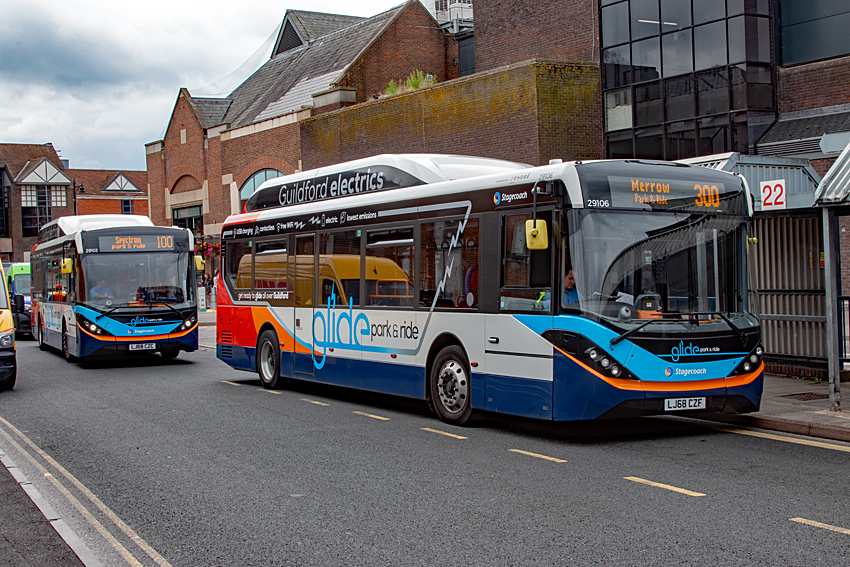
Guildford Park & Ride branded Alexander Dennis Enviro200EV in August 2021

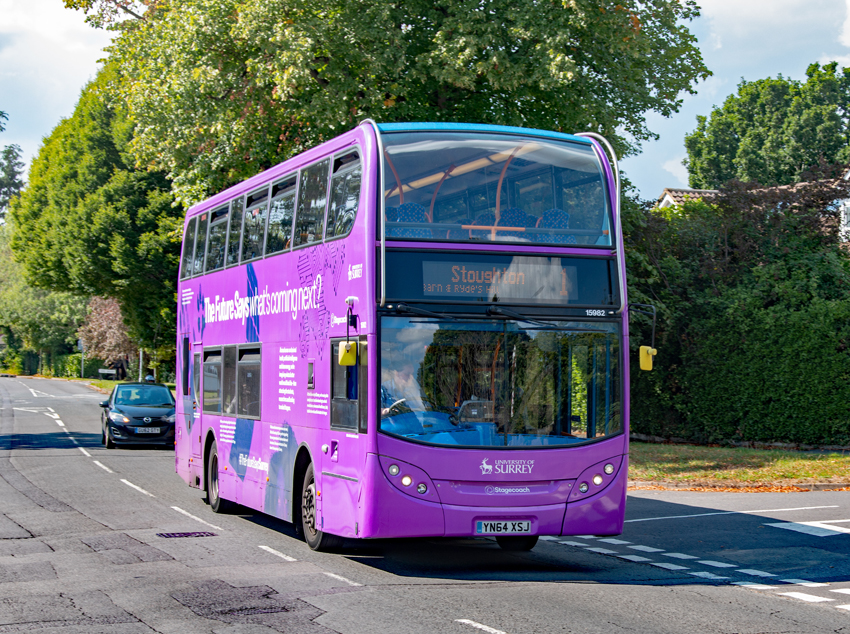
University of Surrey liveried Scania N230UD/Alexander Dennis Enviro400 in August 2022

Two brand new services were launched from 29 July 2018 serving Guildford, the University of Surrey and Stoughton. In January 2019, working with the BYD/ADL Partnership, energy storage specialist Zenobe Energy, as well as members of Surrey County Council and Guildford Borough Council, Stagecoach in Hants & Surrey introduced nine electric Alexander Dennis Enviro200EV buses on their Guildford Park & Ride network, representing an investment of over £3 million.

After Arriva announced their withdrawal of bus operations from their Guildford base in November 2021, Stagecoach announced it would take over Arriva's commercial routes from Guildford, Cranleigh and Woking. However, shortly after the network expansion, Stagecoach reduced frequencies on its services owing to a driver shortage following the COVID-19 pandemic.

Despite the reduced timetable coming into effect on 2 January 2022, routes continued to suffer cancellations. For example, on Thursday 30 June 2022, the company had to cancel 70 journeys, posting cancellations on their Twitter feed. A further timetable reduction was announced by summer 2022, affecting the high-frequency Guildford town services, and a number of bus services in Woking were passed to Safeguard Coaches.

From 1 May 2022, the route 91, which runs between Woking, Goldsworth Park and Knaphill, was given a boost in frequency to every 10–12 minutes during weekdays, every 12–15 minutes on Saturdays, and every 20 minutes on Sundays. However, this was reverted to every 15 minutes on Monday to Saturdays due to the ongoing driver shortage.

Stagecoach buses ceased terminating at Aldershot Bus Station after 7 May 2023, having been using it since 1997. The bus station has been closed as part of a £1.8 million revamp for Aldershot railway station's forecourt.

From April 2024, Stagecoach took over operations of the dedicated shuttle bus between Woking and RHS Garden Wisley. A year later this had been replaced by a new White Bus service connecting Wisley to both Woking and Guildford.

== Stagecoach in the South Downs ==
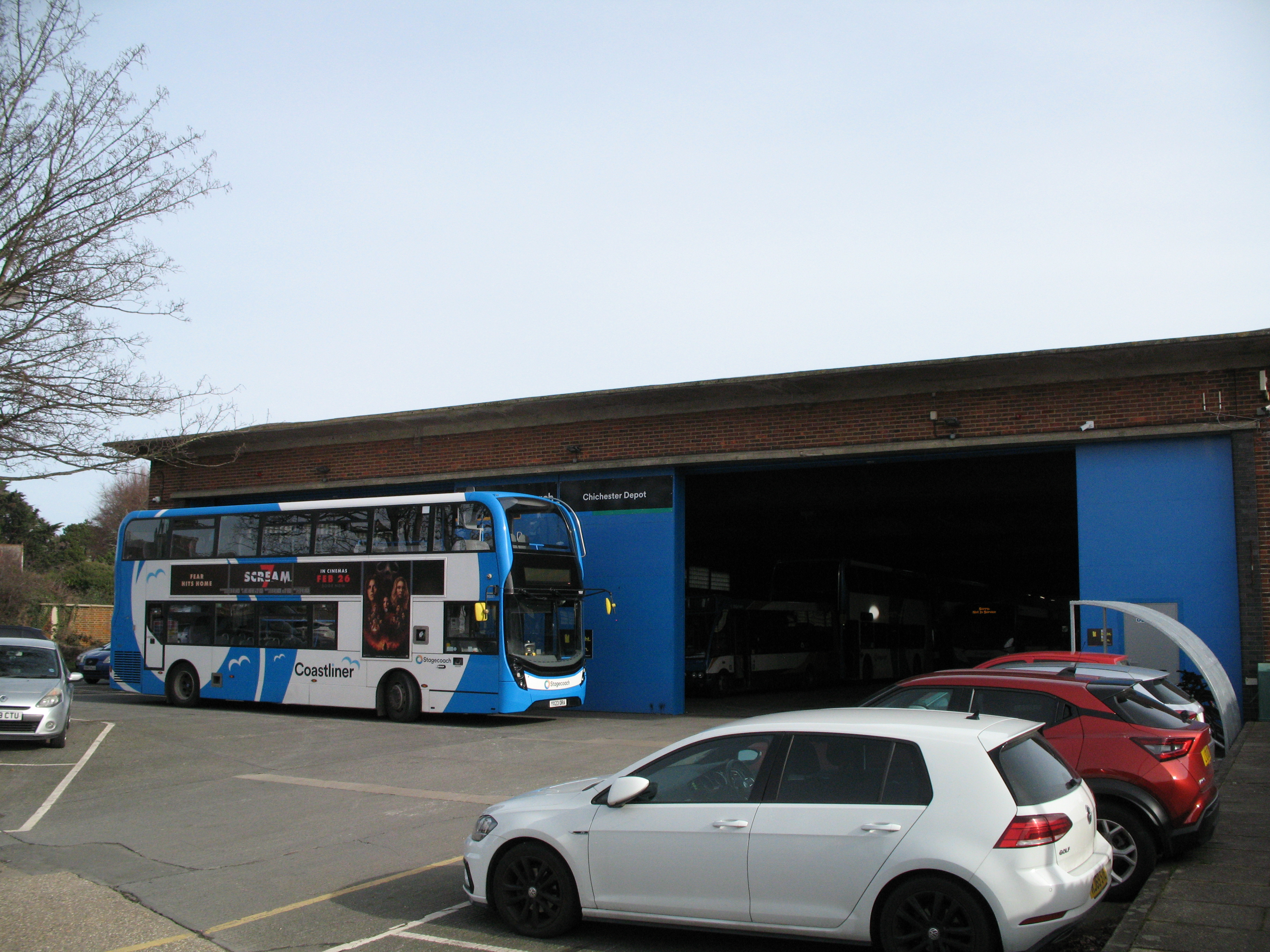
Chichester Bus Depot

Stagecoach in the South Downs operates from depots in Chichester, Portsmouth, Worthing, and Bordon and Petersfield. In August 1989, Stagecoach purchased Southdown Motor Services, which had previously been owned by the National Bus Company until sold in a management buy out.

From 16 April 2018, West Sussex County Council had arranged for bus routes 54, 91, 92, and 93; all primarily based in Petersfield; to be operated by Stagecoach, replacing the arrangement with the Emsworth & District Motor Services.

in 2018, the Coastliner 700 between Brighton & Littlehampton section was upgraded with 19 new Enviro400 MMC vehicles.

In partnership with West Sussex County Council and gaining funding from the Government's Bus Back Better strategy, Stagecoach introduced a new route, numbered 500, from 2 July 2023 between Chichester and Littlehampton via St Richard's Hospital, Barnham and Yapton. A week of free travel on the 500 was offered during the week commencing 23 July.

== Stagecoach in Portsmouth ==
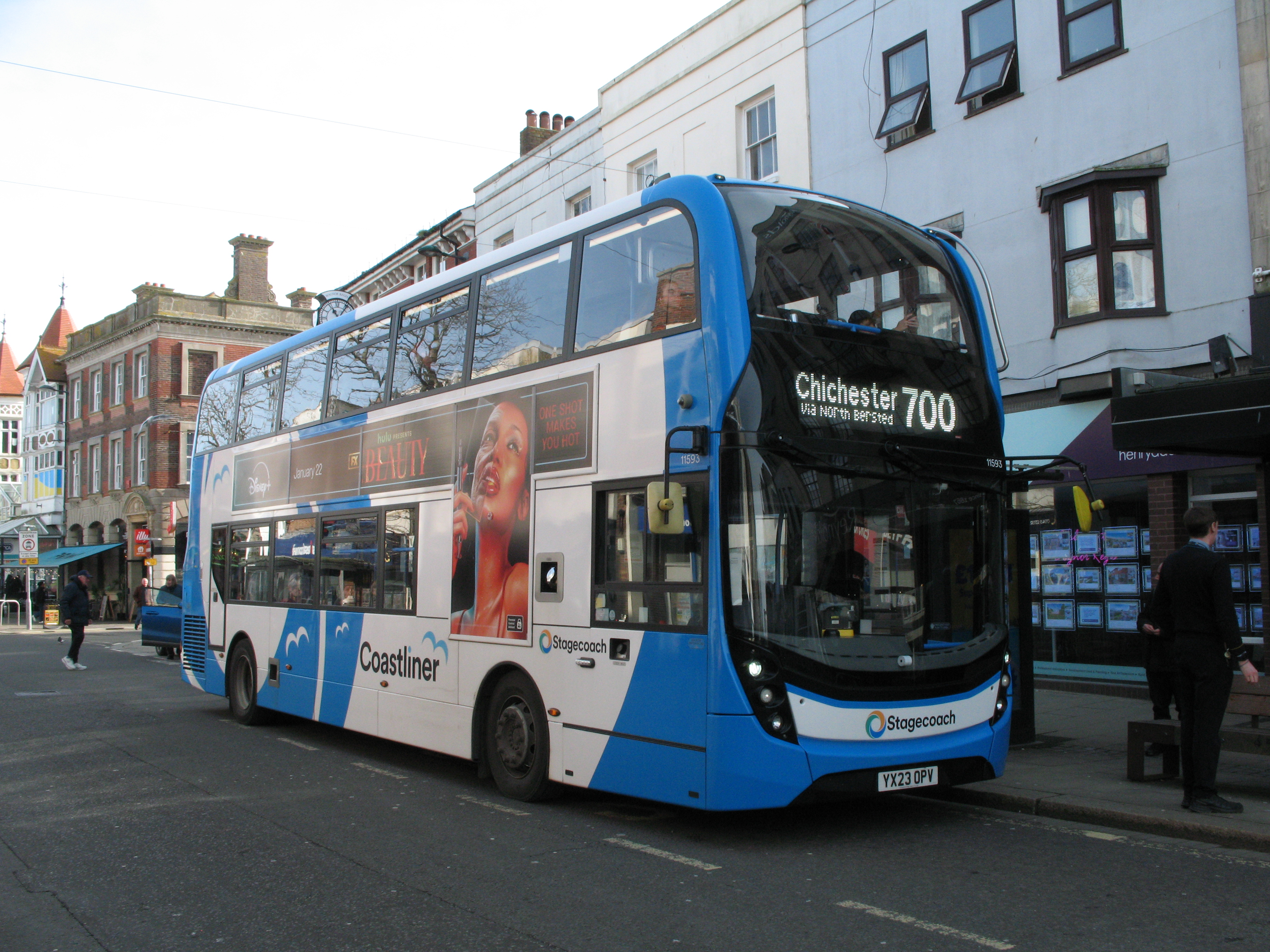
Coastliner in Bognor Regis in February 2026

Stagecoach in Portsmouth operates buses in the Portsmouth city area as well as at Havant, Waterlooville, and Hayling Island.

In 2017, Stagecoach launched twenty new Alexander Dennis Enviro200 MMC buses for the route 23 to Leigh Park

In September 2023, Stagecoach won contracts for 5 routes in Portsmouth previously run by First Hampshire & Dorset. The company won further bus route contracts from January 2024, namely the D1, D2 and 27; with further enhancements to other bus routes, including the introduction of 24-hour operations on route 23.

The company also operates the Coastliner 700 service from Portsmouth to Brighton.

== Fleet Buzz ==
Fleet Buzz, initially known as Countywide Travel, was formed in 1995 as a bus and coach company based on vehicles from Marchwood Motorways and an established depot in Basingstoke. In 1998 the depot relocated to the site formerly used by Oakley Coaches in Oakley, Hampshire, placing itself at a strategic location on a route the company ran between Basingstoke and Winchester. Countywide Travel also parked buses at Hart District Council's Household Waste Recycling Centre near Hartley Wintney, but, due to safety concerns, vacated the premises in 2007.

Countywide Travel took over many of the routes from Tillingbourne Bus Company when it ceased trading in 2001. On 1 October 2007, the coach business was sold to Weavaway Travel and the bus operation moved to Crondall. Around this time, the company was renamed Fleet Buzz for its small black-and-yellow liveried buses being centred around the town of Fleet.

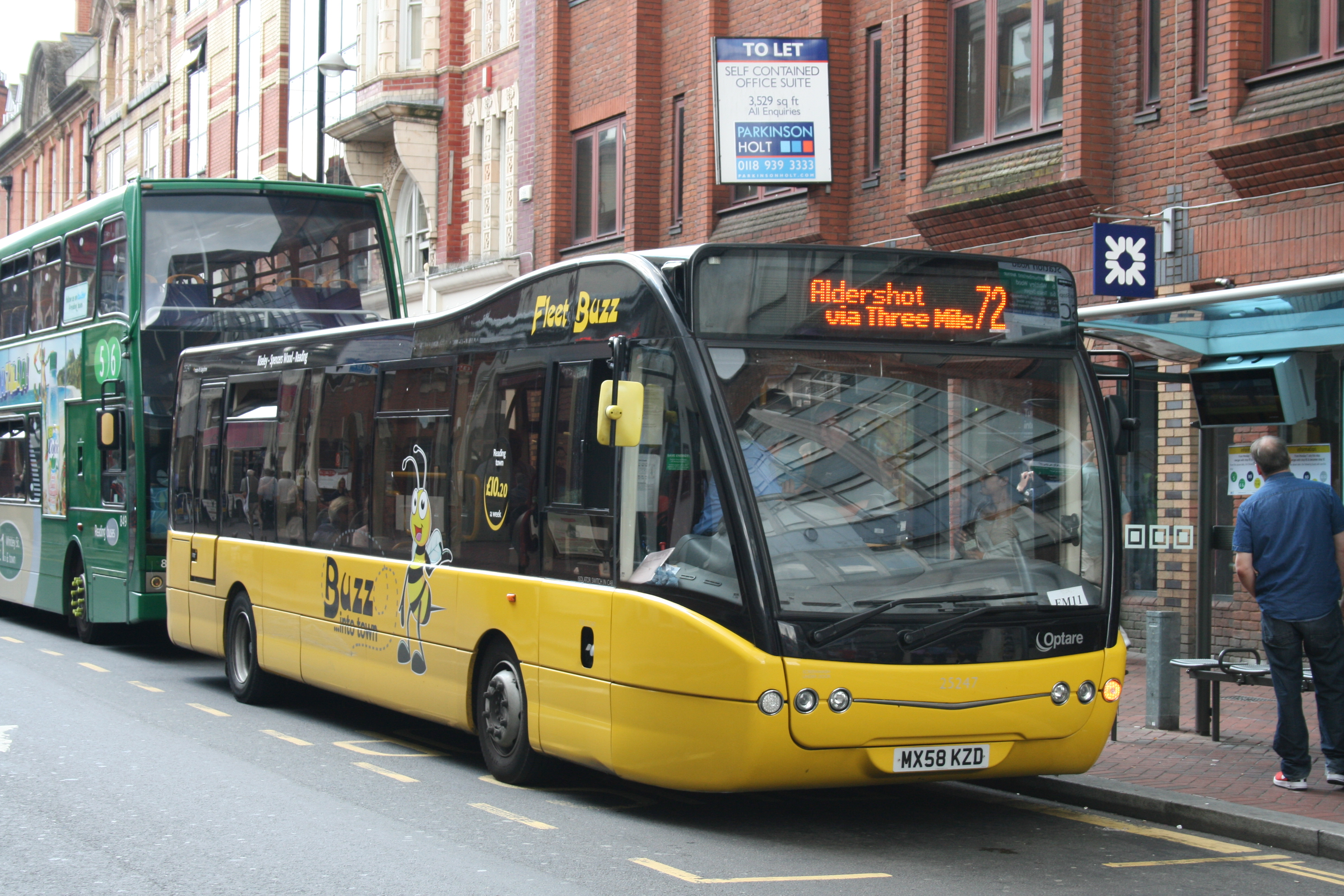
Fleet Buzz Optare Versa at Reading in July 2014

Mercedes-Benz Varios used to form the majority of the company's vehicle fleet, but in 2008–09 the company upgraded its fleet with the purchase of four new Optare Solos and four Optare Versas on lease, as well as two Caetano Nimbuses that previously operated with Travel de Courcey and Reading Buses. Afterwards, other Stagecoach-branded buses replaced the remainder of the step-entrance fleet.

In December 2011, the business was sold to Stagecoach with 22 buses and 29 staff. It was run as a low-cost unit of Stagecoach South. To assist the newly purchased buses, four Plaxton Pointers and three Alexander ALX200s were transferred from Selkent. Further withdrawn step-entrance Stagecoach buses were also transferred or placed on loan to the division.

When the Countryliner bus company ceased trading on 18 January 2013, Stagecoach passed route 41 to Fleet Buzz, after running the route for a week, from 21 January. This coincided with major network changes in April 2013 that saw the Fleet Buzz routes restructured and further expanded into Basingstoke. The company also took over operations of the flexible 'Cango' bus service between New Alresford and Basingstoke.

On 31 December 2014, three years after the Stagecoach takeover, the website was updated to announce the end of the Fleet Buzz name with operations fully integrated into Stagecoach South from the date of a major network change on 5 January 2015. The depot at Crondall closed on 23 May 2015, with staff, routes and buses transferred to Basingstoke and Aldershot.

== See also ==
- List of bus operators of the United Kingdom
