= T7 Bristol–Chepstow =

Bus route in England and Wales

T7
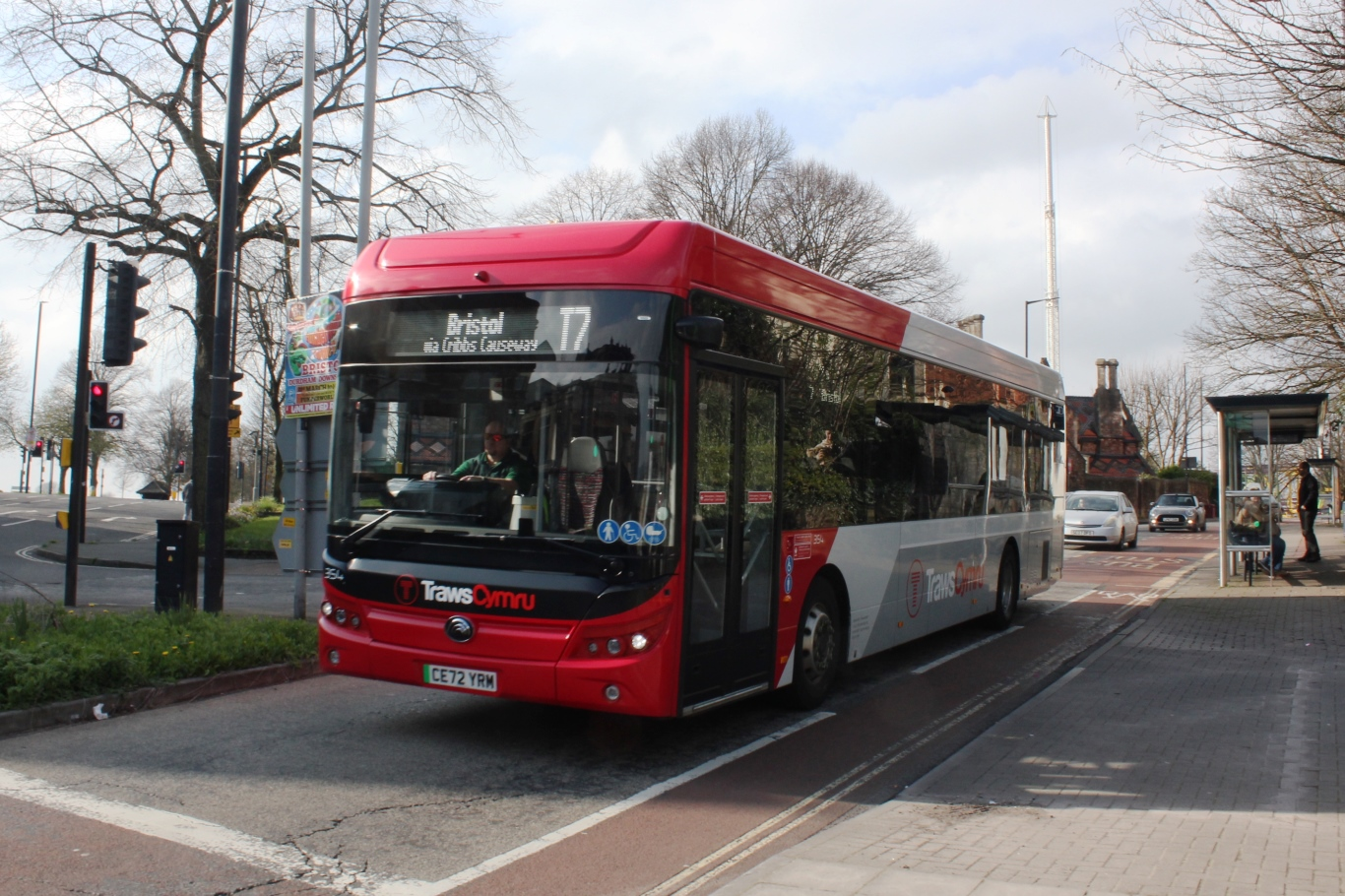
- Newport Bus Yutong E12 operating service T7 in Bristol in March 2024

Overview
- Operator: Newport Bus
- Garage: Newport
- Vehicle: Yutong E12; Alexander Dennis Enviro400 MMC; Previously: MCV Evora
- Peak vehicle requirement: 3
- Began service: 4 January 2021
- Predecessors: X7; Severn Express; X10/X11/X14

Route
- Start: Chepstow
- Via: Bulwark; Cribbs Causeway
- End: Bristol

The T7 is a bus service which operates between Bristol and Chepstow with a limited service to Magor. It is part of the TrawsCymru network.

== History ==
The service was introduced as a partial replacement for the Severn Express, which was withdrawn after 14 June 2020. It began operating on 15 June 2020 on a six-month trial basis and was initially numbered X7. It operated during weekdays only and was operated by NAT Group.

Following a tendering process, the route passed from NAT Group to Newport Bus in January 2021. At this time, the route was also renumbered T7 and it began running seven days per week.

From 1 November 2021, Newport Bus started funding a third vehicle on the route in an attempt to improve service reliability. On 30 January 2022, journeys were allowed more time in response to congestion. The following month, the Welsh Government pledged to fund the third vehicle.

== Route ==
The route runs at an hourly frequency from Monday to Saturday, and runs four times in each direction on Sunday. Starting at Chepstow bus station, the route runs through the residential areas of Bulwark and Thornwell and then runs non-stop to Cribbs Causeway via M48 Severn Bridge, M4 and M5. After Cribbs Causeway, the bus runs along the A4018 which takes it through Westbury-on-Trym, across The Downs and Clifton, it then goes past the Bristol Royal Infirmary and then terminates in Bristol Bus Station. On weekdays and Saturdays, two early morning journeys towards Bristol start at Magor and call at Rogiet, Caldicot, and Portskewett, before continuing to Chepstow and Bristol, and two evening journeys towards Chepstow continue to Magor. On Sundays, the first journey of the day starts at Magor while the last continues to Magor after Chepstow.
