= 5X =

5X or 5-X may refer to:

== Codes ==
- 5X, IATA code for UPS Airlines
- 5X, the production code for the 1982 Doctor Who serial The Visitation

== Electronics ==
- Huawei Honor 5X, a mobile telephone
- Nexus 5X, a mobile telephone

== Mathematics ==
- 5x, or five times in multiplication

== Vehicles ==
=== Aircraft ===
- Dassault Falcon 5X, a business jet
- Light Miniature Aircraft LM-5X, a full-sized replica of the Piper PA-18 Super Cub

=== Cars ===
- Chery Tiggo 5X, a subcompact SUV built since 2017

== Arts and entertainment ==
"5x", a song by Don Toliver from Life of a Don, 2021

== See also ==
- X5 (disambiguation)
