= Severn Express =

Bus route in England and Wales

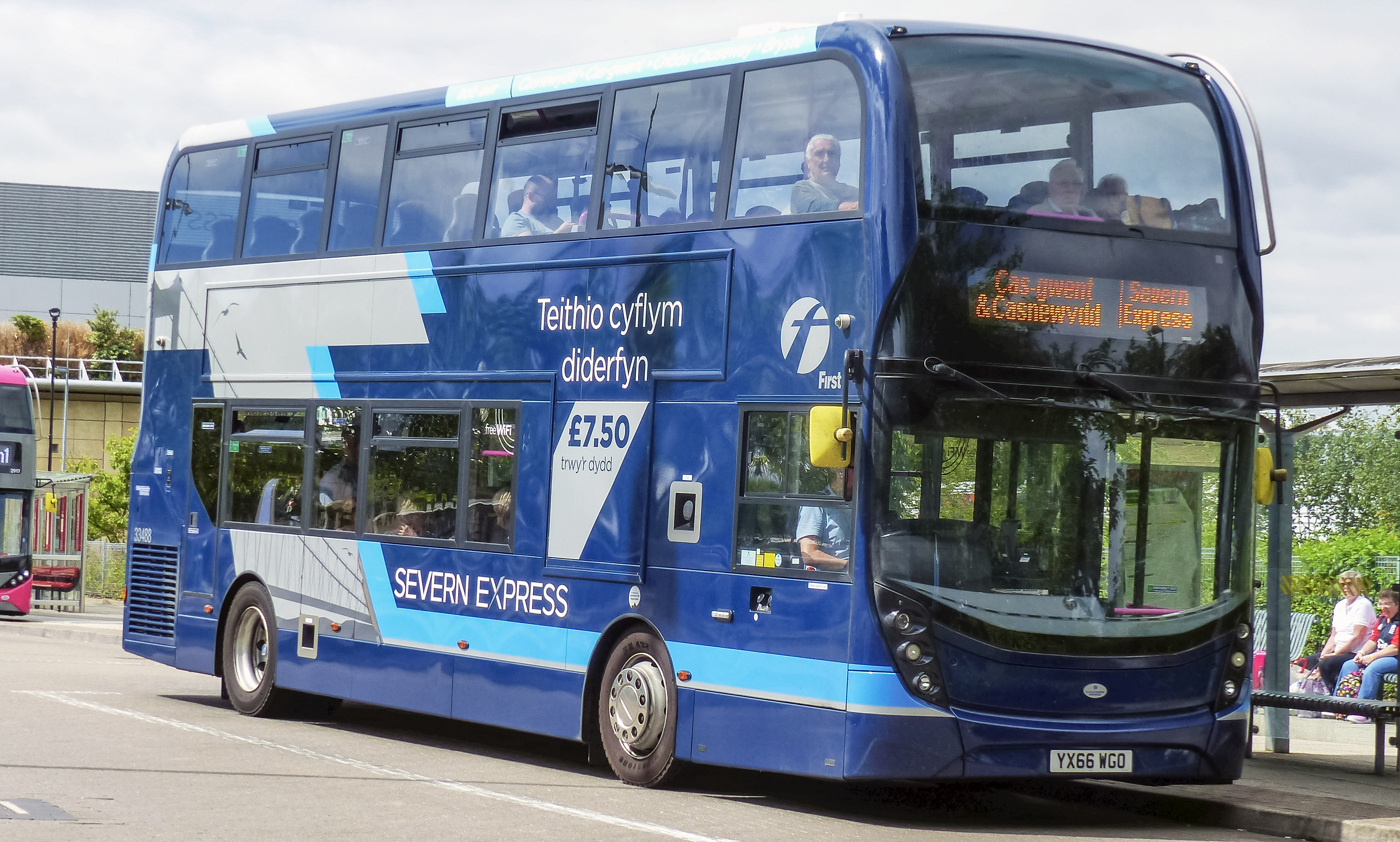
- First West of England Alexander Dennis Enviro400 MMC at Cribbs Causeway in July 2019

Overview
- Ended service: 14 June 2020
- Predecessors: X10/X11/X14; X7 Severn Express
- Former operators: First West of England; Stagecoach West

Route
- Start: Bristol
- Via: Bulwark; Chepstow; Coldra
- End: Newport

Severn Express was a bus service which operated between Bristol and Newport via Chepstow and Coldra.

== History ==
On 1 September 2019, the route (along with X5 Weston-super-Mare –Cribbs Causeway) was transferred from First West of England to Stagecoach West who operated it as a Stagecoach Gold service. First noted the removal of tolls from the Severn Bridge as having contributed to lower passenger numbers.

From 5 January 2020, the stops at Cribbs Causeway and Aust were removed. Stagecoach stated that the route had been running at a financial loss and that the changes were to improve journey times and punctuality in the hope of increasing passenger numbers.

The service was withdrawn on 14 June 2020. It was partially replaced by the X7 Trawshafren service operated by the NAT Group between Bristol and Chepstow.
