= Stagecoach Gold bus route S3 =

Bus route in Oxfordshire, England

S3
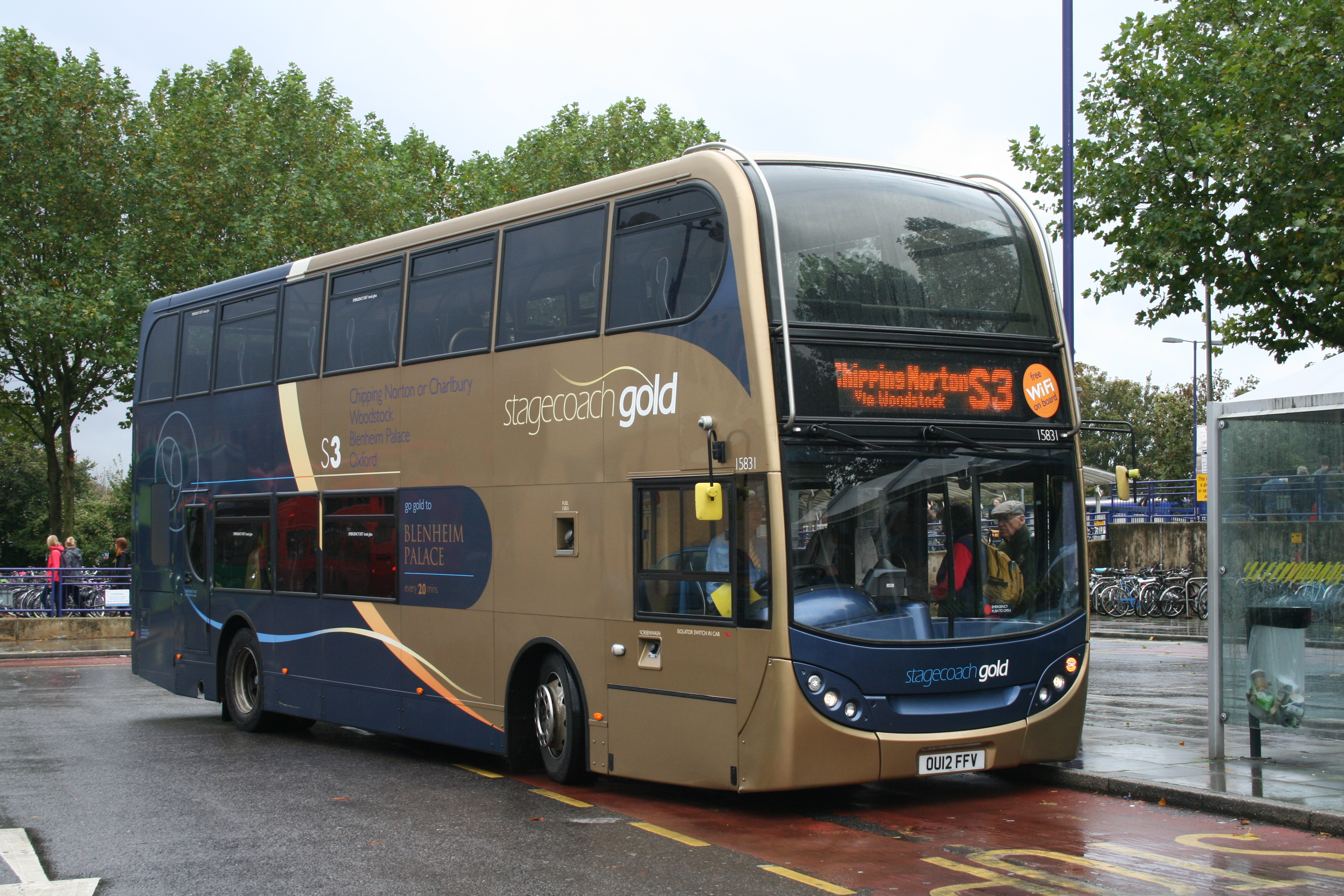
- Stagecoach Gold Alexander Dennis Enviro400 bodied Scania N230UD at Oxford station

Overview
- Operator: Stagecoach West
- Garage: Oxford
- Night-time: NS3

Route
- Start: Chipping Norton or Charlbury
- Via: Woodstock; Blenheim Palace; Yarnton
- End: Oxford

Service
- Frequency: Up to every 30 minutes
- Operates: Daily
- Timetable: S3 timetable

Stagecoach Gold bus route S3 is a bus route in England that links Chipping Norton, Charlbury, Woodstock, Yarnton and Oxford. The service is run by Stagecoach West.

== History ==
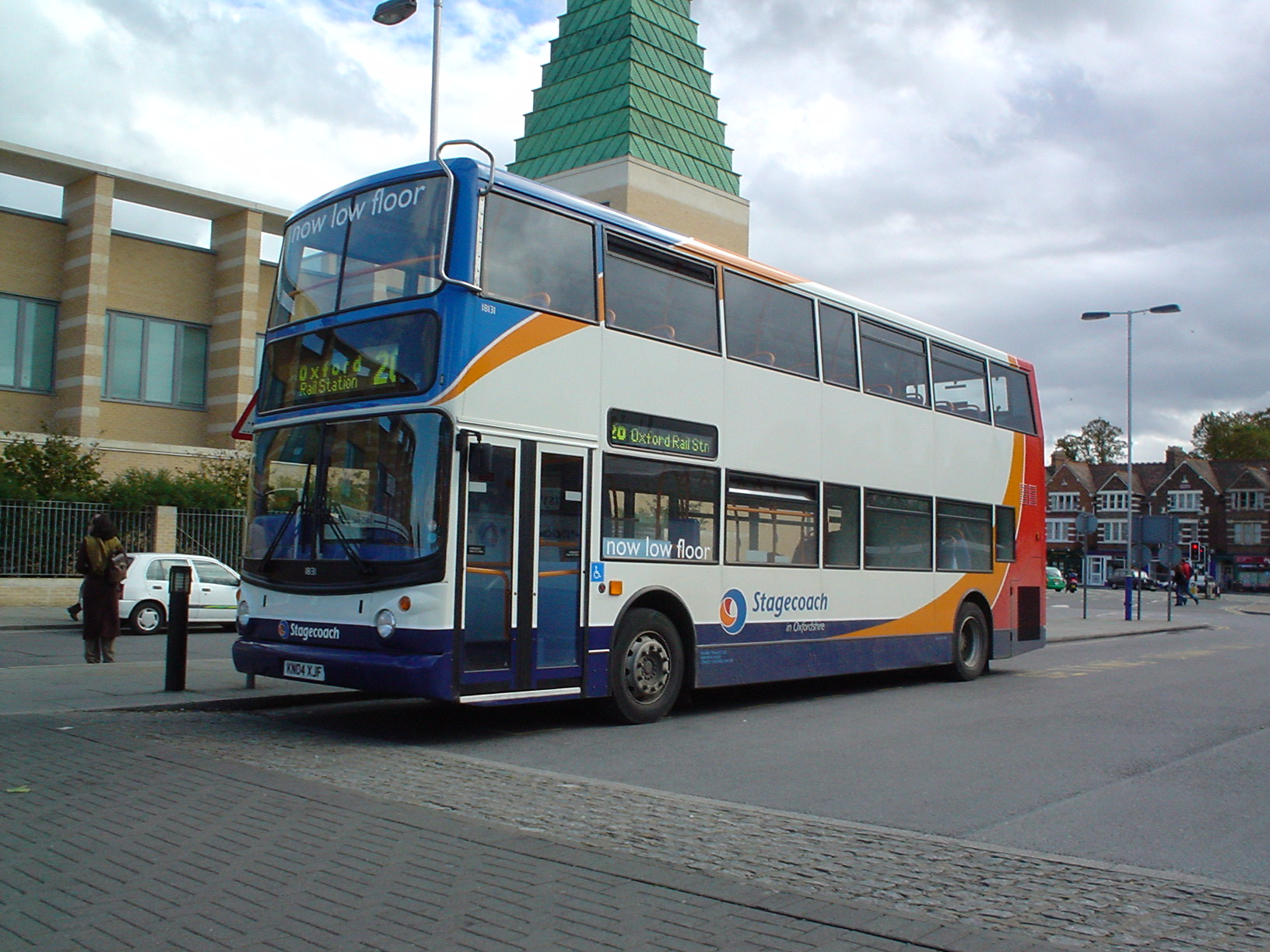
Stagecoach Oxfordshire bus on route 20 at Oxford station in 2004

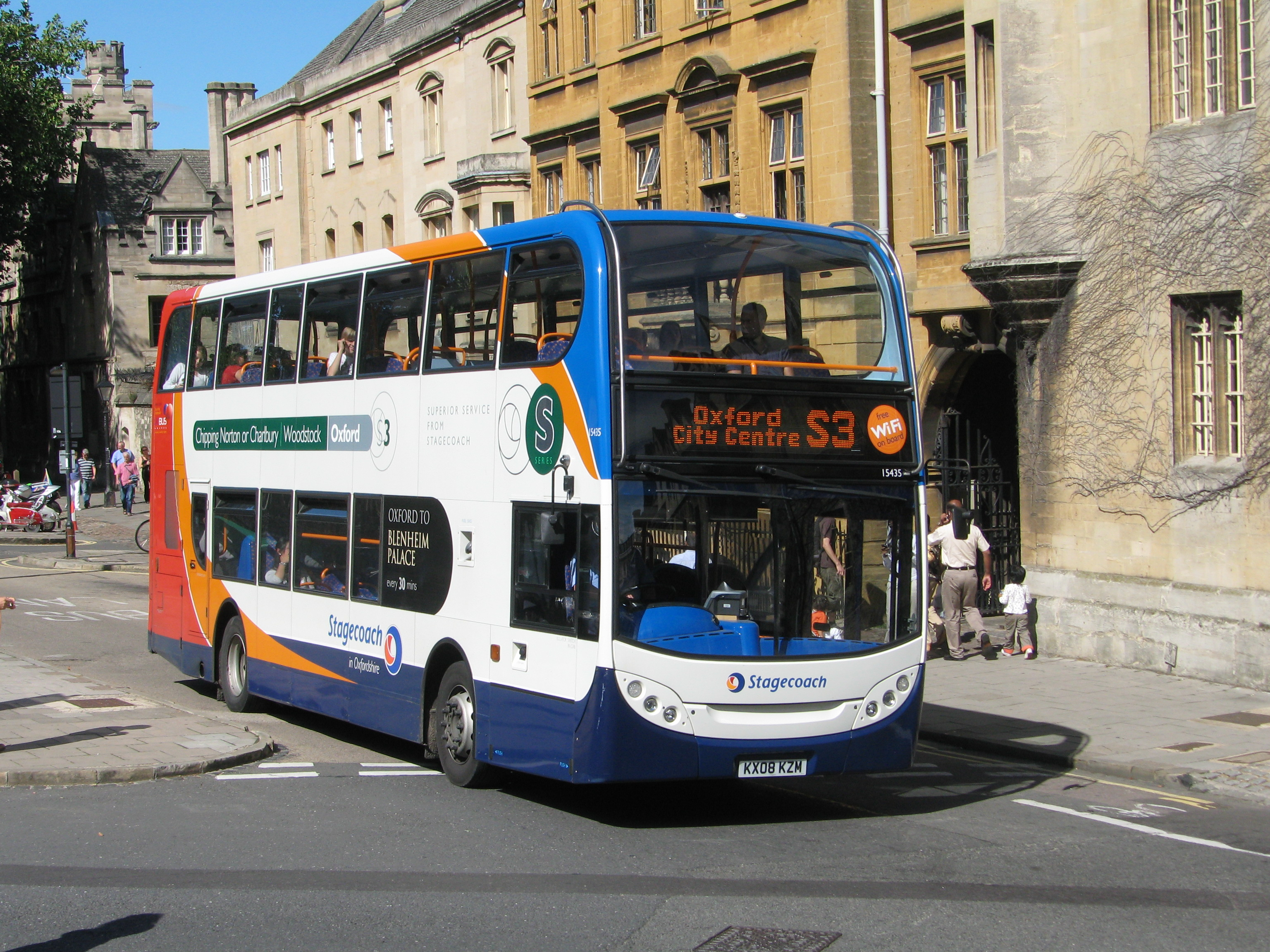
Stagecoach Oxfordshire Alexander Dennis Enviro400 bodied Scania N230UD in Oxford in August 2010

Prior to being numbered S3, route S3 used to operate as routes 20/20A, with route 20 operating between Chipping Norton & Oxford and 20A between Charlbury & Oxford. The services were numbered S3 in 2009 when Stagecoach launched the 'S' Series routes across the county.

Route S3 was upgraded to Stagecoach Gold status in September 2012.

In 2017, route S3 was caught up in a bus route war in Woodstock following the extension of an Oxford Bus Company Park & Ride service and the creation of Stagecoach's route 7. Subsequently, route S3's daytime frequency was reduced to two buses per-hour instead of three, and would work alongside route 7 to provide four services per-hour between Woodstock and Oxford.

Since 2022, the sections of route north of Woodstock have been operated under contract to Oxfordshire County Council.

== Route ==
Route S3 operates between Chipping Norton, Woodstock & Oxford and Charlbury, Woodstock & Oxford. The Chipping Norton branch of the route starts in the South of the town before making its way towards the town centre. From there, the service joins the A44 and leaves the town towards the East. The service continues down the A44 London Road passing through Enstone before arriving in Woodstock.

The Charlbury branch of the route starts on Church Street, Charlbury before heading South and leaving the village via the B4022 before turning off and joining Main Street towards Stonesfield. The route travels through the village on the main road before leaving South-East via Combe Road towards Combe. In Combe, the service runs along the outer road, then heading North to join the A44 and heading towards Woodstock.

From Woodstock, all services continue down the A44, passing Blenheim Palace and then turning in to Yarnton. The service, travels through Yarnton via the main road and then re-joins the A44 heading towards Oxford. At Wolvercote roundabout, the route joins Woodstock Road heading towards the city centre. From the city centre, the service heads to its terminus at Oxford station via George Street and Park End Street.

Some early morning and evening services serve both Chipping Norton and Charlbury. These services go via Chadlington and Spelsbury.

The total off-peak journey time between Chipping Norton and Oxford is approximately 67 minutes and approximately 64 minutes for journeys between Charlbury and Oxford.

Route S3 - Chipping Norton branch	Route S3 - Charlbury branch
Chipping Norton, West Street	Charlbury, The Bell
Enstone, Green	Fawler, Farm
Kiddington, Import Cottage	Stonesfield, Village
Old Woodstock, Hill Rise	Combe, Akeman Street
Woodstock, Marlborough Arms	Old Woodstock, Hill R
Woodstock, Blenheim Palace Gates	Woodstock, Marlborough Arms
Begbroke, Royal Sun	Woodstock, Blenheim Palace Gates
Yarnton, The Paddocks	Begbroke, Royal Sun
Oxford, Woodstock Road South Parade	Yarnton, The Paddocks
Oxford, George Street	Oxford, Woodstock Road South Parade
Oxford, Station	Oxford, George Street
	Oxford, Station

== Service ==
Services run throughout the day Monday to Saturday with services up to every 30 minutes with one service per-hour terminating in Chipping Norton and the other terminating in Charlbury. There are late evening services that run between Chipping Norton and Oxford with one night service (NS3) Monday to Saturday at 00:35 to Chipping Norton. There is no late evening service on the Charlbury branch. The NS3 only runs in one direction from Oxford to Chipping Norton.

There is a Sunday service on the Chipping Norton branch of the route with the service running up to every 30 minutes between Woodstock and Oxford and every 60 minutes between Chipping Norton and Oxford. Late evening services run every 60 minutes Monday to Sunday with an earlier finish on Sunday evenings.
