= X5 Weston-super-Mare - Portishead =

Bus route in England

X5

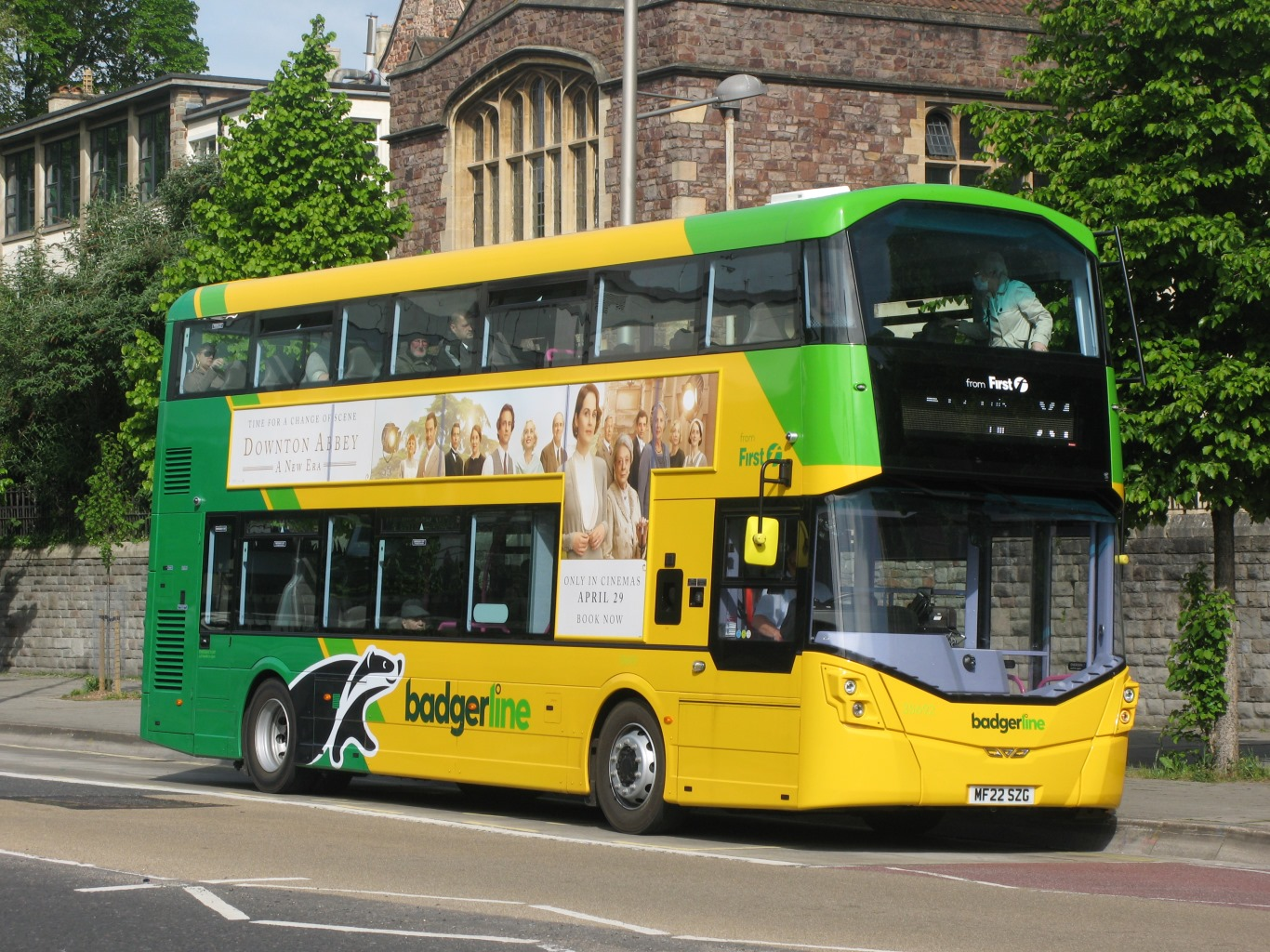

Overview
- Operator: First West of England
- Garage: Weston-super-Mare
- Peak vehicle requirement: 3
- Status: Operating
- Former operator: Stagecoach West (2019–2020)

Route
- Start: Weston-super-Mare
- Via: Worle, Clevedon, M5 motorway
- End: Portishead

Service
- Frequency: every 60 minutes
- Operates: Monday to Saturday (except bank holidays)
- Timetable

X5 is a bus route that runs between Weston-super-Mare and Portishead. It is currently operated by First West of England but has been operated by Stagecoach West in the past.

== History ==
In 2014, a Sunday and public holiday service was introduced on the route.

On 1 September 2019, routes X5 and Severn Express transferred from First West of England to Stagecoach West.

In January 2020, some lesser used buses on the route were withdrawn. May 2020, Stagecoach announced that it would withdraw the route after 13 June. The company stated that it was losing £3,000 per week as passenger numbers were too low to cover the operating costs of the route. On 28 May, it was announced that First Bus would once again take over operation of the route and that it would run to Bristol city centre instead of Cribbs Causeway.

In August 2022, it was announced that the route could be withdrawn as it was no longer commercially viable. This was blamed on driver shortages and reduced passenger numbers. Later that month, it was announced that the central part of the route would be retained but that it would only operate between Worle and Portishead. The service change will be implemented on 10 October 2022. This decision was u-turned after protests from residents that lived along this routs.

== Route ==
The route starts at Marine Parade on the seafront in Weston-super-Mare. Leaving Weston, the route follows the B3440 Locking Road to its end at the A370 at Worle. It then briefly joins the A370 before joining the M5 northbound towards Clevedon. The X5 leaves the M5 at Junction 20 for Clevedon and forms a loop around the town following Central Way, Southern Way, Old Church and Great Western Road into Clevedon Town centre. Leaving Clevedon, the bus takes a direct route along the B3124 passing through the village of Weston-in-Gordano before terminating at The Precinct stop on Portishead High Street. The return journey to Weston-super-Mare makes a small loop around the town to serve the Sainsbury's supermarket and Harbour Road before following the same route back to Weston-super-Mare.
