= Old Dean =

Suburb of Camberley, Surrey, England

Coordinates: 51°21′N 0°43′W

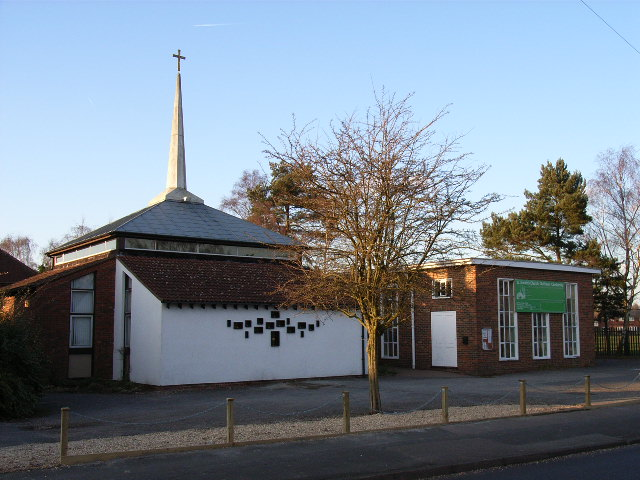
- St. Martin's Church

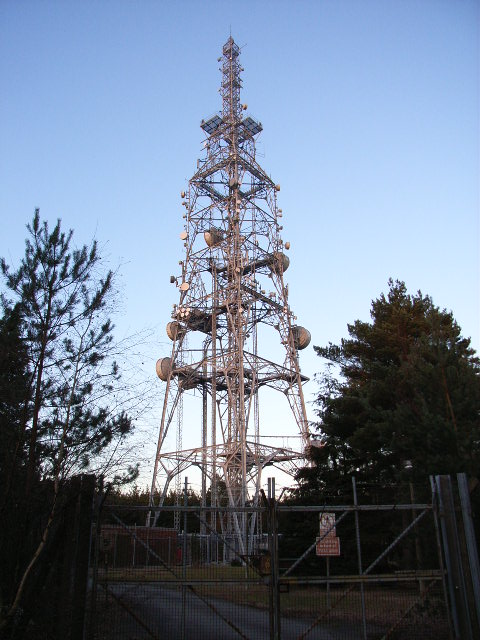
- Bagshot Heath TV Relay Transmitter

- Location within the United Kingdom
- Area: 3.40 km^{2} (1.31 sq mi)
- Population: 5,650 (2020)
  - Density: 1,662/km^{2} (4,300/sq mi)
- Language: English; French (during WWII, whilst officially Free French soil)
- OS grid reference: SU889619
  - London: 45 km (28 mi) NEE
- Civil parish: N/A
- District: Surrey Heath
- Shire county: Surrey
- Country: England
- Sovereign state: United Kingdom
- Post town: CAMBERLEY
- Postcode district: GU15
- Dialling code: 01276
- UK Parliament: Surrey Heath
- Website: www.surreyheath.gov.uk

The Old Dean is a suburb of Camberley in Surrey, England. The area starts approximately 1 km NNE from the town centre. The estate is built on the Olddean or Old Dean Common falling within the district of Surrey Heath Borough Council. It is bordered to the north by Barossa Common; to the east by Swinley Forest; to the south by the A30 (London Road); and to the west by Diamond Ridge Woods.

Properties in this area, built in the 1950s and 1960s, are mainly semi-detached and terraced, with a number of maisonettes on the northern edge of the estate. It was originally a council estate, however, under the Conservative government's right to buy scheme, a proportion of these properties are now in private ownership.

== History ==
Most of the estate was built in the 1950s on the Old Dean Common for residents of heavily bombed areas of Greater London that were in Surrey, not the County of London between 1894 and 1965 and were made homeless after World War II, expanded by the Camberley Urban District, with county assistance, to be used in part as a London overspill estate. Many of the roads on the estate reflect this, being named after the London boroughs which paid for the expansion (the others are named after places on the common). They are Carshalton Road, Esher Road, Kingston Road, Mitcham Road, Surbiton Road, Sutton Road, Wallington Road, and Wimbledon Road.

When the estate was first constructed, the portion between the A30 and Upper College Ride, was littered with demolished concrete blockhouses and military installations, such as Nissen huts. An "ideal" playground for the dozens of children who moved there in the early 1950s.

In the early 21st century more affordable housing was added.

=== The Second World War ===
==== Free French Forces ====
From October 1940 until May 1945, the Old Dean Common was considered Free French soil with French as its official language, serving as a camp for Charles de Gaulle's Free French Army. The camp housed barracks and training grounds, initially consisting of tents, but by February 1941 had expanded to Nissen huts and a flag pole, and later a parade ground and other wooden structures.

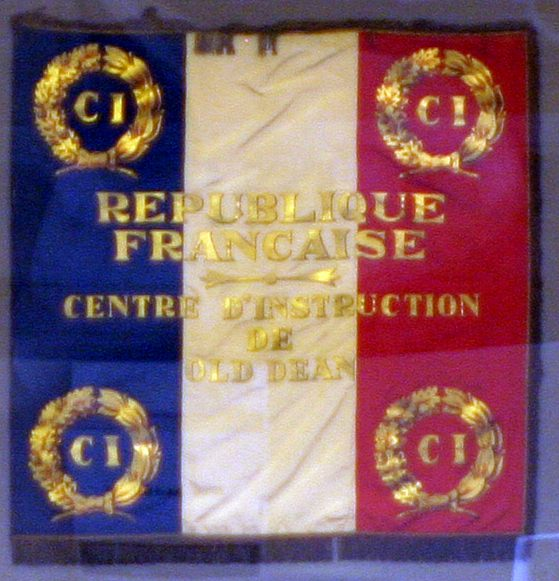
An exhibit in the Musée de l'Ordre de la Libération in Paris commemorating the Free French instruction camp on the Old Dean during the Second World War

Charles de Gaulle, Leader of the Free French, was known to visit the camp and inspect his troops. In addition the UK Prime Minister Winston Churchill was also known to have visited the camp on multiple occasions.

The connection to the Free French is maintained in the name of one of its primary schools: Lorraine takes its name from the Cross of Lorraine, from the French Region, the School's badge features the Free French insignia. When the school opened under the tutelage of Mr MacKean, the then French Ambassador attended the opening ceremony and read a message from General de Gaulle. In June 2005 surviving members of the Free French Lorraine 342 Squadron visited Lorraine School and presented a plaque to the school, which can be found in its hall.

==== Prisoner of War Camp ====
After the Second World War finished, the camp was transformed into an internment camp, holding German Prisoners of War.

Approximate location of the former Prisoner of War camp'"`UNIQ--ref-0000004B-QINU`"'

== Amenities ==
The estate has a parade of convenience and service shops which are near its centre, a doctor's surgery, three parks, a youth centre and three churches (Church of England St Martin's, Roman Catholic St Peter's & St John's and Newfrontiers' The Beacon Church).

=== Schools ===
The Old Dean has four schools:

- Pine Ridge Infant School
- Lorraine School & Nursery
- Cordwalles Junior School
- Collingwood College

=== Fire Station ===
The Old Dean is home to the Camberley Fire and Rescue Service. The station has the following equipment: two fire engines; a multi role vehicle; and an Unimog.

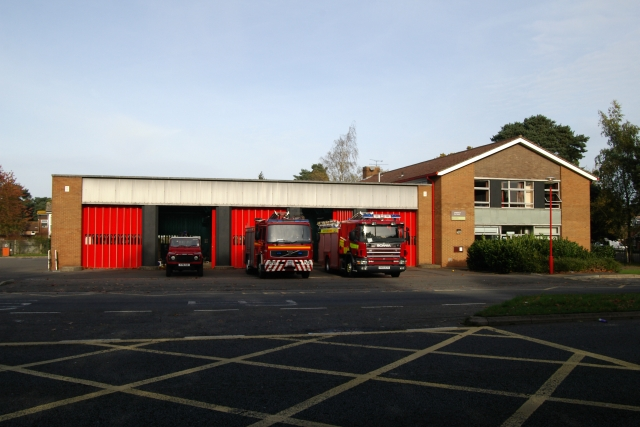
Camberley Fire Station, located along the A30.

== Media ==
The estate has been used as a location for filming scenes in the fictional BBC drama Holby Blue. Shots were filmed around the Old Dean including high speed police chases.

== Transport ==
Roads

The only through route serving the area is the A30.

Public Transport

The Stagecoach Gold bus service 1 connects the Old Dean with Camberley Town Centre and Aldershot.

Camberley railway station is centred 1.1 miles (1.8 km) south.

== Points of Interest ==
=== Telecommunications Mast ===
The estate is also home to the Bagshot Heath Telecommunications Mast, a microwave relay tower constructed by the General Post Office in 1965 that formed part of the GPO's microwave network. The tower originally relayed communications along two routes between the BT Tower and Bristol, and the BT Tower and Rowridge. Over the years the tower has hosted various antenna types and configurations, such as horns, shrouded parabolics and sectors.
