= Neoplan Skyliner =

German double deck luxury coach

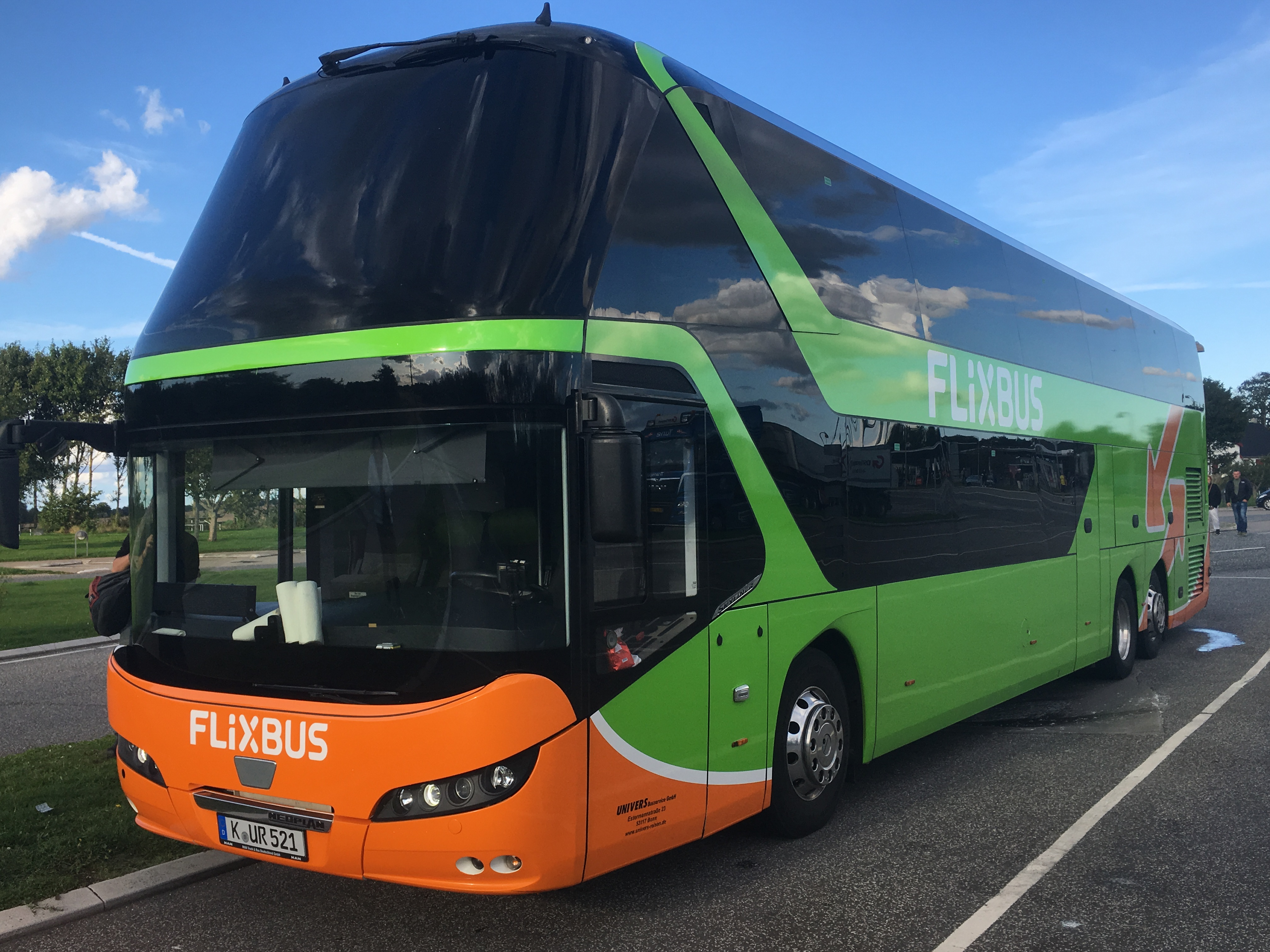
- A 2019 model year Neoplan Skyliner in FlixBus livery in Sorø, Denmark.

Overview
- Manufacturer: Neoplan Bus GmbH, subsidiary of MAN Nutzfahrzeuge AG
- Production: 1967–present
- Assembly: Plauen, Saxony, Germany; Akyurt, Ankara, Turkey
- Designer: Konrad Auwärter

Body and chassis
- Class: Coach
- Body style: Double-deck multi-axle touring coach
- Layout: Longitudinal rear-engine design

Powertrain
- Engine: 12.5 L MAN D2676 LOH I6 multi-valve CR turbodiesel
- Transmission: 12-speed TipMatic ZF AS Tronic automated manual

Dimensions
- Wheelbase: 6,700 and 1,470 mm (263.8 and 57.9 in)
- Length: 14.00 m (45 ft 11 in)
- Width: 2.55 m (8 ft 4 in)
- Height: 4.00 m (13 ft 1 in)
- Kerb weight: 26,000 kg (57,320 lb) (GVWR)

The Neoplan Skyliner is a double-deck, multi-axle luxury touring coach built by German coach manufacturer Neoplan. It was introduced in 1967.

== History ==
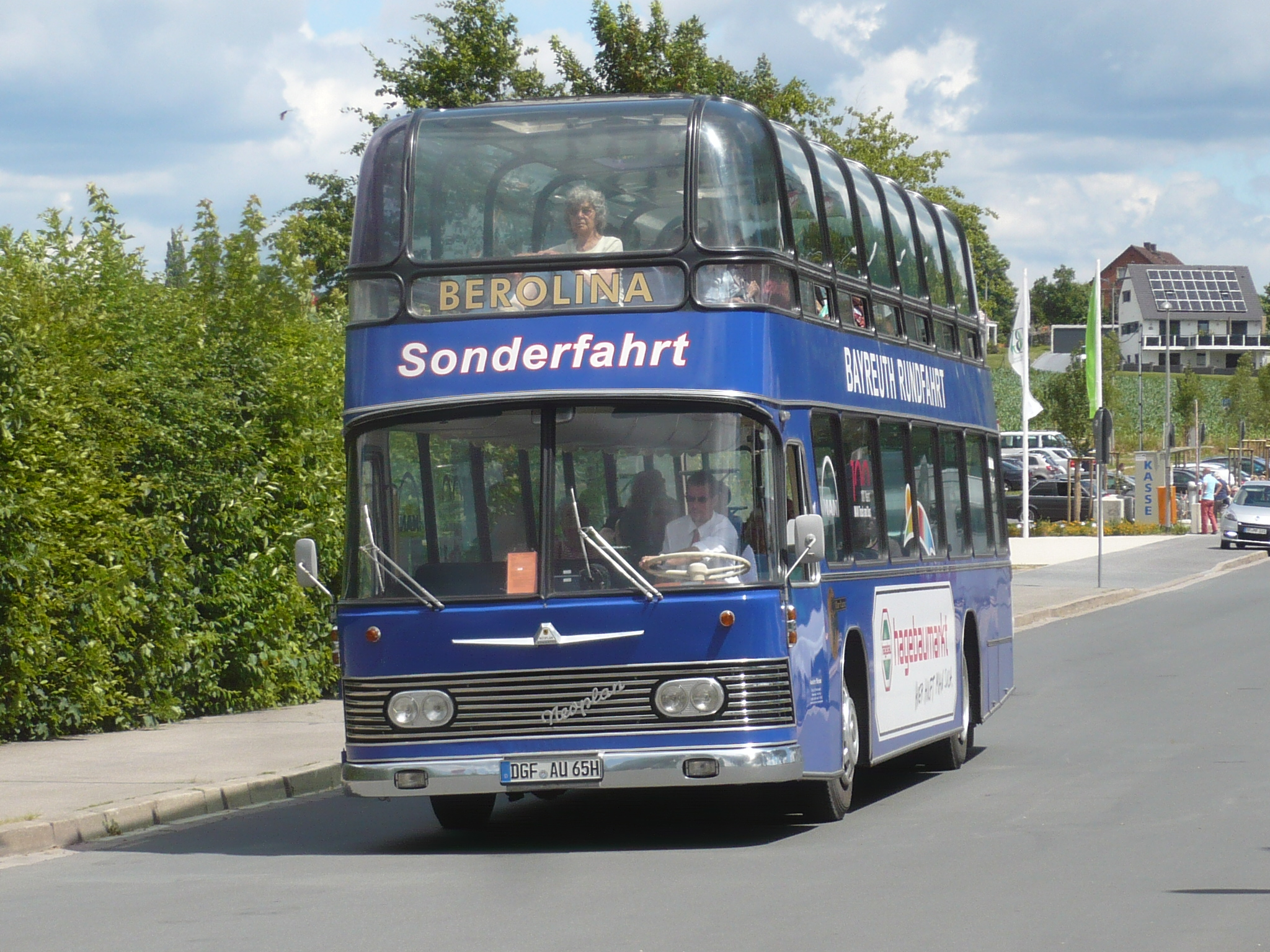
A Do-Bus prototype at the Landesgartenschau in Bayreuth, June 2016

In 1964, the founder's second son, Konrad Auwärter, developed a double-deck design for a service bus as part of his dissertation. The 'Do-Bus' design had extremely low weight, and could carry over 100 passengers. It also featured a low-frame front axle with forward-mounted steering gear that permitted a low flat floor. The double-deck principle was applied to coach design, creating a revolutionary high-capacity comfortable vehicle for touring. This vehicle became known as the Skyliner, and created an image for the company that differentiated the Neoplan brand from its competitors, and created interest in its products across Europe.

A second manufacturing facility opened in Pilsting in 1973, and a third opening in Kumasi, Ghana, in December 1974 to support a large order.

The double-deck Skyliner concept was taken to its ultimate conclusion in 1975, with the introduction of the Jumbocruiser, a double-deck articulated coach 18 metres (59 ft 1 in) long and 4 metres (13 ft 1 in) high. The Spaceliner, introduced in 1979 took the Cityliner concept of passenger floor level above the driver, and extended the actual floor above the cab. This kept the height of the vehicle lower than a double-decker, at 3.65 metres (12 ft 0 in), but still allowed installation of toilets, kitchens or sleep cabins below the passenger compartment. From 1983 to 2000, the quad-axle Neoplan Megaliner was produced as the larger production counterpart to the Skyliner.

=== United States ===
In 1989, its subsidiary Neoplan USA introduced a domestically produced version of the Skyliner as the AN122/3, which designated the manufacturer (American Neoplan), model (122), and number of axles (3). Production in the United States qualified the bus for federal subsidies according to the requirements of the Buy America Act. The AN122/3 was available with Detroit Diesel Series 60 engines and Allison B500 transmissions which are fitted typically to transit buses, allowing the double-decker bus to share spares inventory and maintenance facilities with the rest of the bus fleet.

Adoption of the Skyliner occurred mainly in California, along with smaller orders for open-top Skyliners for sightseeing operators in Chicago and New York City. AC Transit in Oakland, California evaluated one AN122/3 in April 1983 but did not proceed with a fleet purchase. The Southern California Rapid Transit District of Los Angeles operated Neoplan USA Skyliners during the 1980s and early 1990s. Antelope Valley Transit Authority also operated Skyliners on their Lancaster-Los Angeles route during the late 1990s and early 2000s. Open-top AN122/3s are known to have been used by Big Taxi Tours in New York City and formerly by Chicago Trolley & Double Decker Co. in Chicago.

=== United Kingdom ===
The Neoplan Skyliner also gained popularity in the United Kingdom. Stagecoach bought some right-hand drive Skyliners during the 1980s to facilitate its new coaching division developed during the company's early years. In 2004, it bought 25 more N122/3L Skyliners for its modern coaching divisions the Oxford Tube and Megabus. Trathens Travel Services of Plymouth also bought some Skyliners in 2005 for its National Express contracts. However, many of these were displaced following the 2007 accident with a National Express Skyliner (see below) - when some Plaxton Panthers were bought in 2007, followed in later years by double-decker Plaxton Panoramas, Salvador Caetano Boa Vistas/Invictuses and Van Hool Astromegas.

=== Japan ===
The Neoplan Skyliner has also gained popularity primarily as a long-distance/overnight and sightseeing bus in Japan ever since Chūō Kōtsū Bus (Osaka Prefecture) (ja:中央交通 (大阪府)) bought its first such bus in 1979. A shorter-wheelbase N122/2 version measuring 9 m (29 ft 6 in) in length developed specifically for the Japanese market also appeared for smaller and medium-sized bus operators from the mid-1980s. Many Neoplan Skyliner buses in Japan use domestically produced powertrains and engines such as those from Nissan Diesel or Isuzu.

=== South Korea ===
Some Neoplan Skyliners are used mainly as sightseeing buses in Seoul and Daegu.

== Accidents ==
In March 2003, near Nažidla in South Bohemian Region a Neoplan Skyliner overturned on Czech European route E55, killing nineteen people and one man died two years later due to the injuries sustained in the crash. Thirty-four people were injured. It was the biggest bus accident in history of the Czech Republic.

In May 2003, a Neoplan Skyliner overturned on a French highway, killing twenty-eight people. A report by French investigators recommended that drivers of double-deck coaches should receive special training because of the vehicle's relative instability. A separate study, presented to the United Nations Economic Commission for Europe in the same year reported that high-sided coaches were much more likely to overturn in crashes than standard single-deck coaches. The German manufacturer added a safety system, known as electronic stability control, which brakes each wheel separately to prevent overturning, in 2006.

In January 2007, a Neoplan Skyliner operated by National Express overturned and crashed on the M25 motorway near Heathrow Airport, killing two passengers; a third passenger died six-months later due to the injuries sustained in the crash. The company temporarily withdrew all twelve Skyliners from service pending investigations The crash was deemed to have been caused by travelling at excessive speed and the driver was charged with three counts of causing death by dangerous driving. He was subsequently jailed for five years and banned from driving for three years. No safety issues were found. The electronic stability control system which had been introduced on new vehicles in 2006 was not used on this vehicle.

== Specifications ==
The Neoplan Skyliner has undergone a process of evolution in specification since its 1967 introduction. From 2009 until 2018, the double-deck Skyliner was available in two lengths: the Skyliner C and the Skyliner L. The shorter C version was originally 12.00 metres (39 ft 4 in) long, but was later lengthened to 12.44 metres (40 ft 10 in); and the Skyliner L was 13.79 metres (45 ft 3 in) long, and includes a correspondingly longer wheelbase. The Skyliner C was designed to seat 69 passengers plus two crew (driver and steward), whereas the Skyliner L seated 77 plus two. From 2019, the Neoplan Skyliner was lengthened to 14 metres (45 ft 11 in), and can seat 83 passengers plus two crew (driver and steward), including space for up to two wheelchairs.

For the powertrain detail, current Skyliners use a MAN diesel engine sourced from Neoplan parent company MAN Nutzfahrzeuge AG. This Euro VI rated diesel fueled internal combustion engine is the 12.5 litre MAN D2676 LOH 02 straight-six (R6) common rail turbodiesel with intercooler, which displaces 12,419 cubic centimetres (757.9 cu in), and utilises four valves per cylinder and cylinder-direct fuel injection. It uses a Bosch EDC7 electronic engine control unit, and also uses a 'PM-KAT' catalytic converter. It produces a DIN-rated motive power output of 353 kilowatts (480 PS; 473 hp) at 1,900 revolutions per minute (rpm), and generates a torque turning force of 2,300 newton-metres (1,696 lbf⋅ft) at 1,050-1,400 rpm. The engine is mounted upright in a longitudinal orientation at the rear of the coach, and transmits its output to the rear roadwheels via a twelve-speed TipMatic ZF AS Tronic automated manual transmission.

An interesting design on the Skyliner is its 'tag' third axle. This is able to articulate, during steering movements - and this helps reduce tyre wear, which can afflict dual rear axle vehicles. It features disc brakes all round, and utilises independent suspension on the front and trailing third axles, whilst the driven axle is a solid version.

Standard safety features include 'electronically regulated braking system' (EBS) with braking assistant (BA) and Electronic Stability Programme (ESP). It also features a speed-limiting device called 'maximum speed control' (MSC), and is fitted with an accident data recorder (ADR). An optional feature is the 'lane guard system' (LGS), which will vibrate the drivers seat should the coach drift out of its lane.

Its maximum permissible weight is 26,000 kilograms (57,320 lb), and can have a total luggage volume of up to 7.9 cubic metres (279 cu ft).

model	internal combustion engine	max. power @ rpm	max. torque @ rpm	transmission	wheelbase	length	width	height
Skyliner C (double-deck multi-axle)	MAN D2676 LOH 02, 12,412 cc (757.4 cu in) R6 common rail turbodiesel	353 kW (480 PS; 473 hp) @ 1,900	2,300 N⋅m (1,696 lbf⋅ft) @ 1,050-1,400	12-speed TipMatic; ZF AS Tronic automated manual	5,550 and 1,300 mm (218.5 and 51.2 in)	12.44 m (40 ft 10 in)	2.55 m (8 ft 4 in)	4.00 m (13 ft 1 in)
Skyliner L (double-deck multi-axle)	MAN D2676 LOH 02, 12,412 cc (757.4 cu in) R6 common rail turbodiesel	353 kW (480 PS; 473 hp) @ 1,900	2,300 N⋅m (1,696 lbf⋅ft) @ 1,050-1,400	12-speed TipMatic; ZF AS Tronic automated manual	6,900 and 1,300 mm (271.7 and 51.2 in)	13.79 m (45 ft 3 in)	2.55 m (8 ft 4 in)	4.00 m (13 ft 1 in)

== Gallery ==
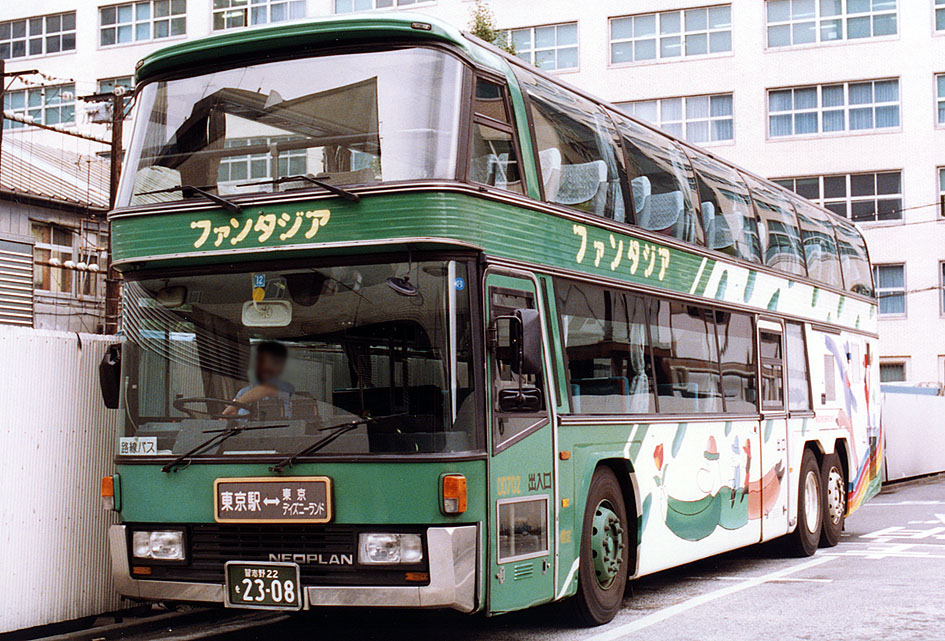
Early-1980s Skyliner N122/3 operated by Airport Transport Service in Tokyo, Japan

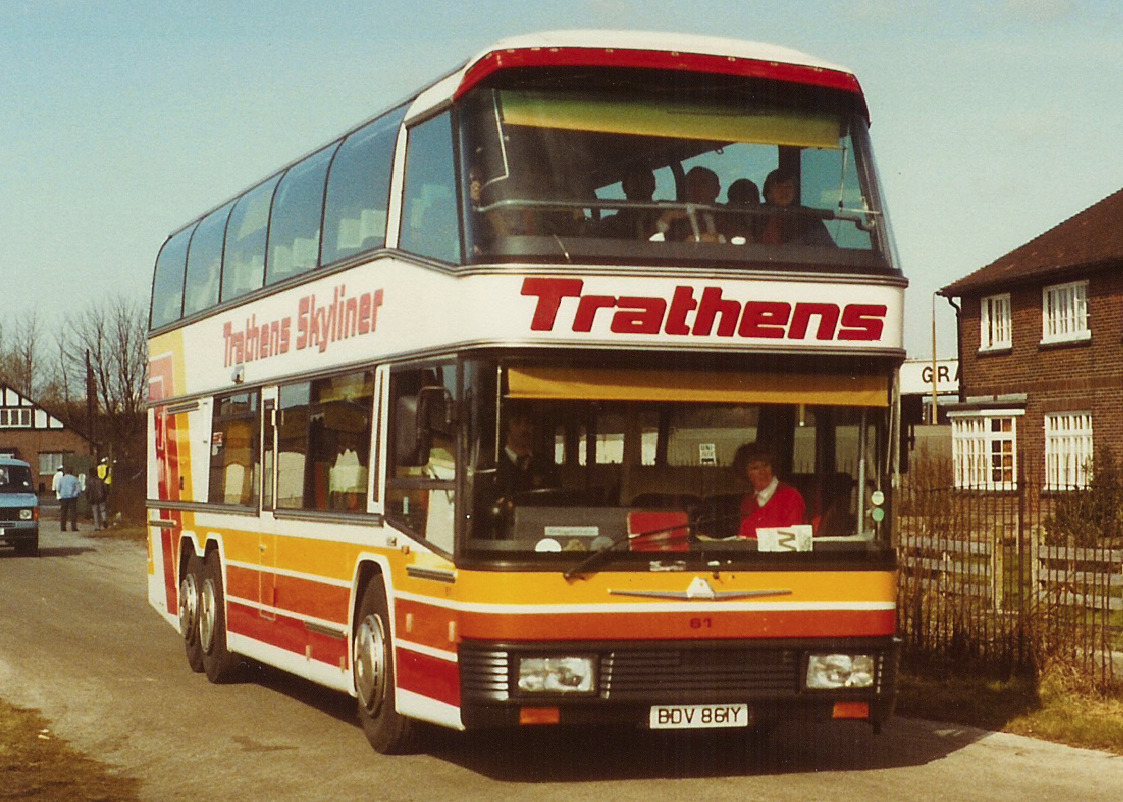
1983 model year Skyliner N122/3 operated by Trathens Travel Services, Plymouth

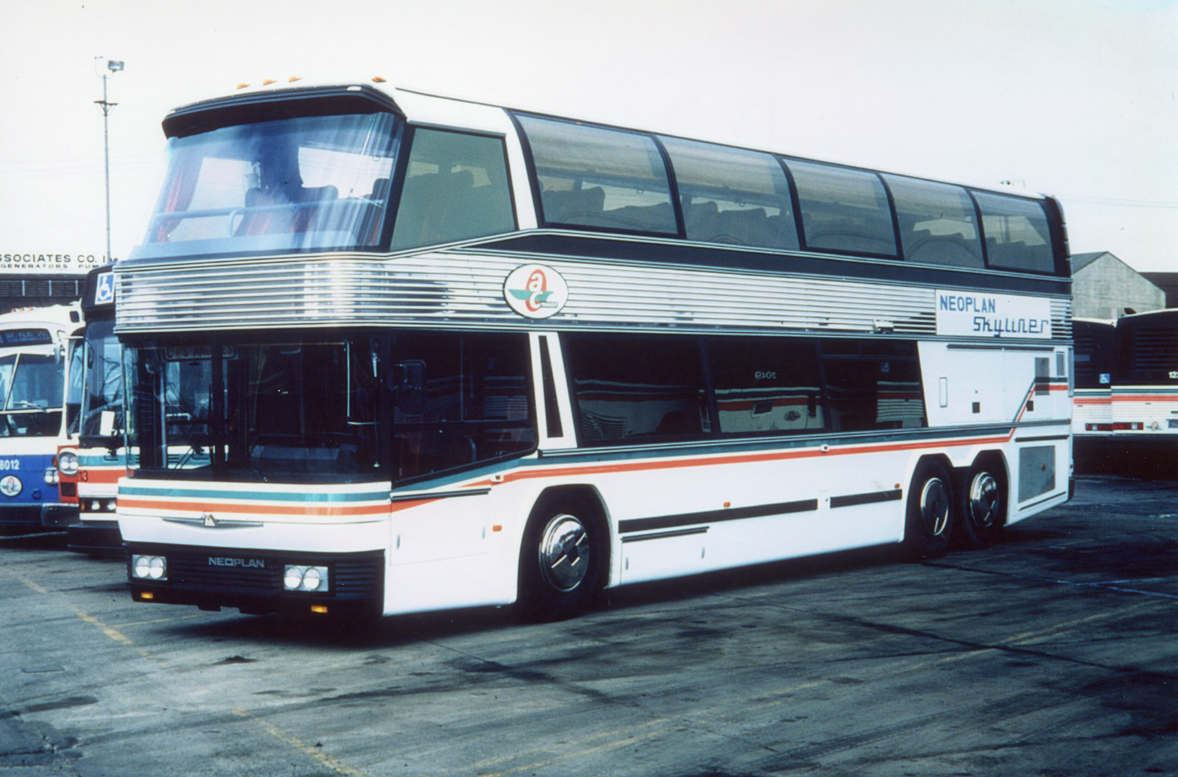
1983 model year Skyliner AN122/3 evaluated by AC Transit in Oakland, California

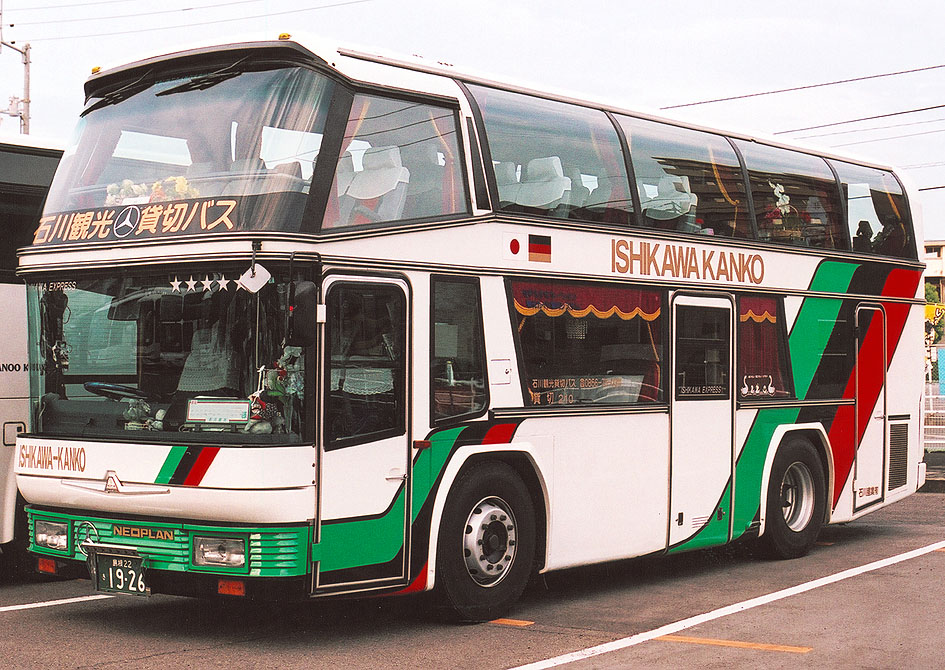
1985 model year shorter-wheelbase Skyliner N122/2 operated by Ishikawa Sangyō; powertrain supplied by Mercedes-Benz

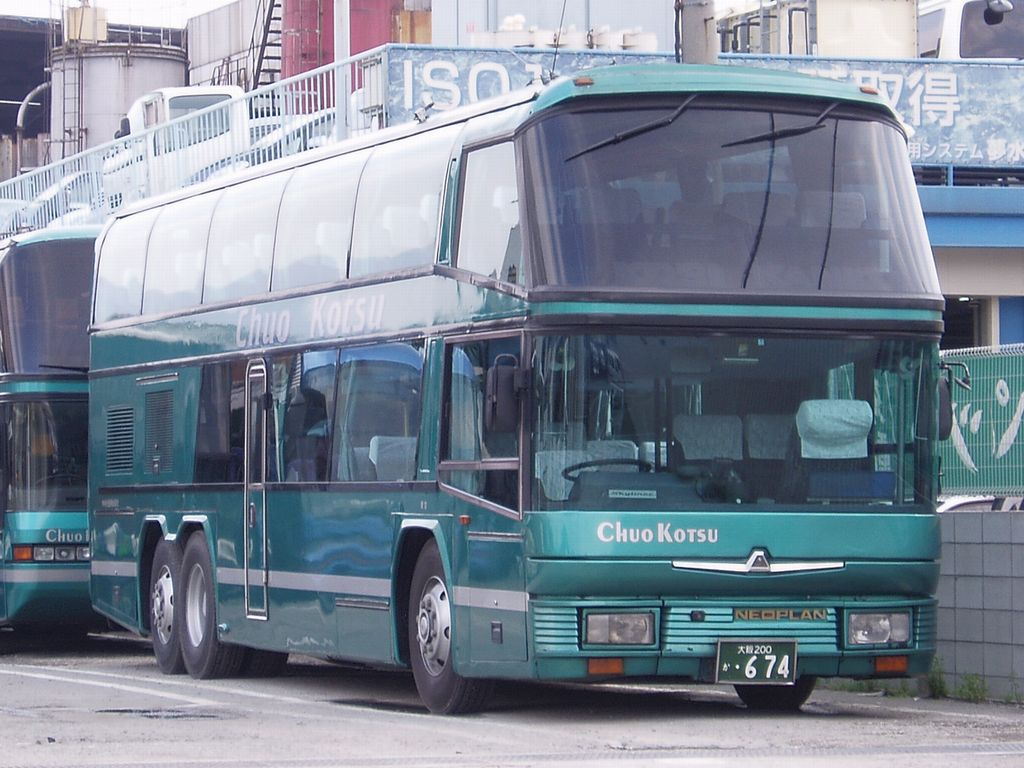
1986 model year Skyliner N122/3 operated by Chūō Kōtsū Bus (Osaka Prefecture); powertrain supplied by Nissan Diesel

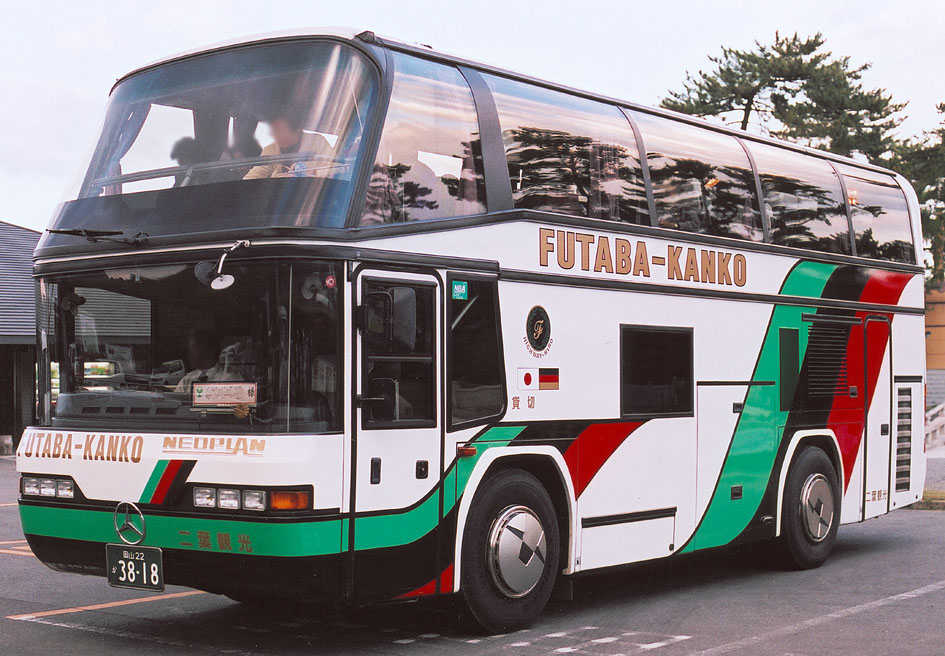
1991 model year shorter-wheelbase Skyliner N122/2 operated by Futaba Kankō in Okayama Prefecture; powertrain supplied by Mercedes-Benz

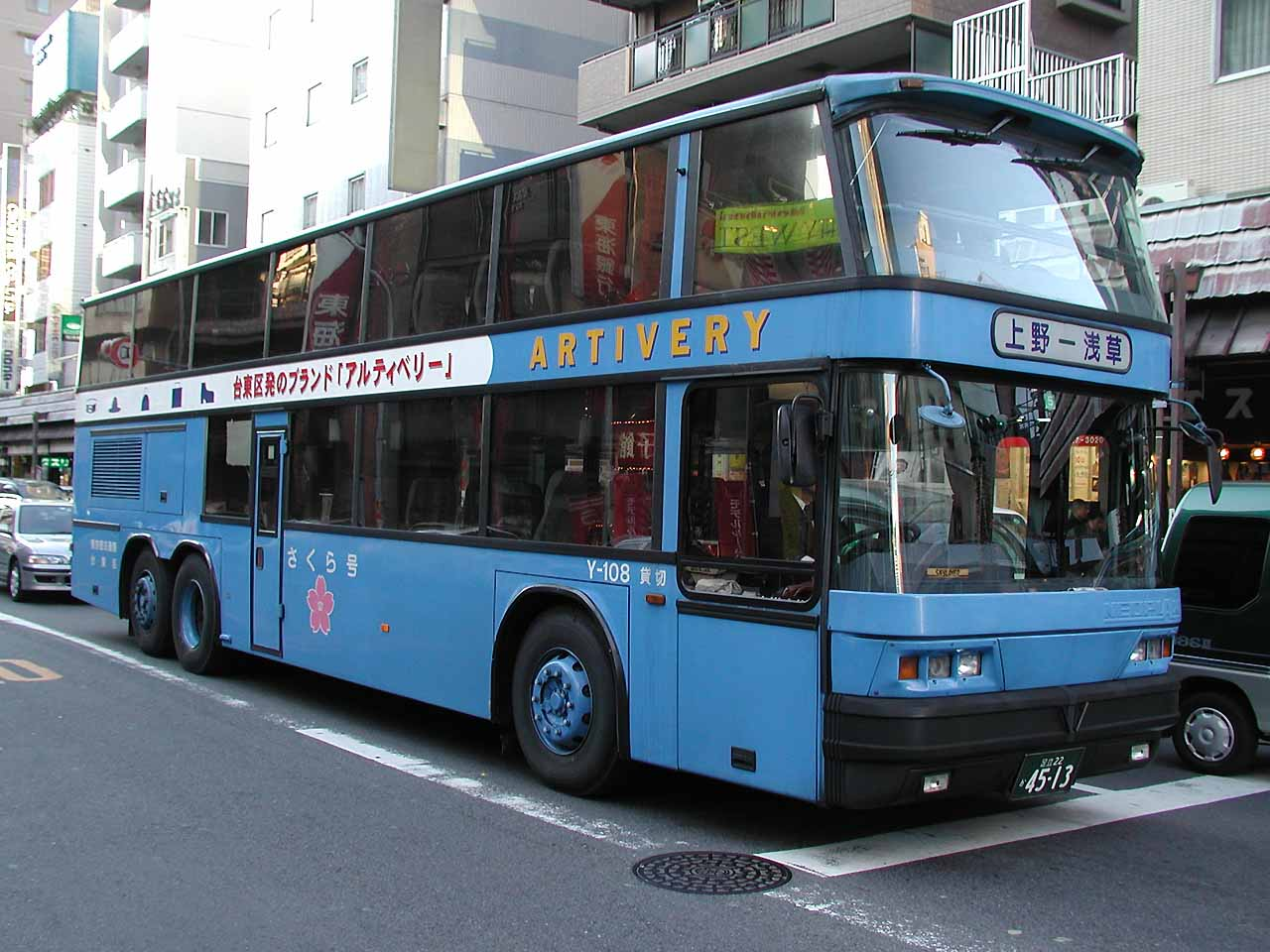
1992 model year Skyliner N326/3 operated by Tokyo Metropolitan Bureau of Transportation

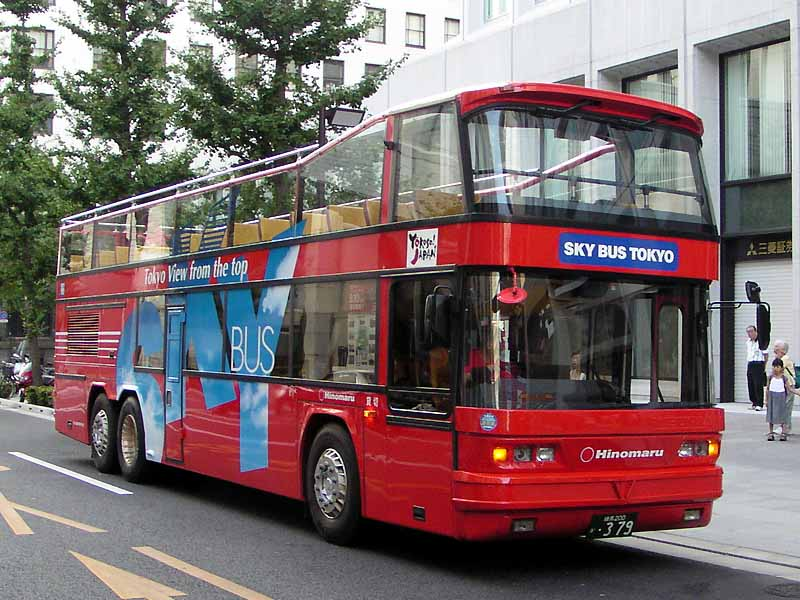
1992 model year Skyliner N326/3 (open-top conversion) operated by Hinomaru Jidōsha Kōgyō

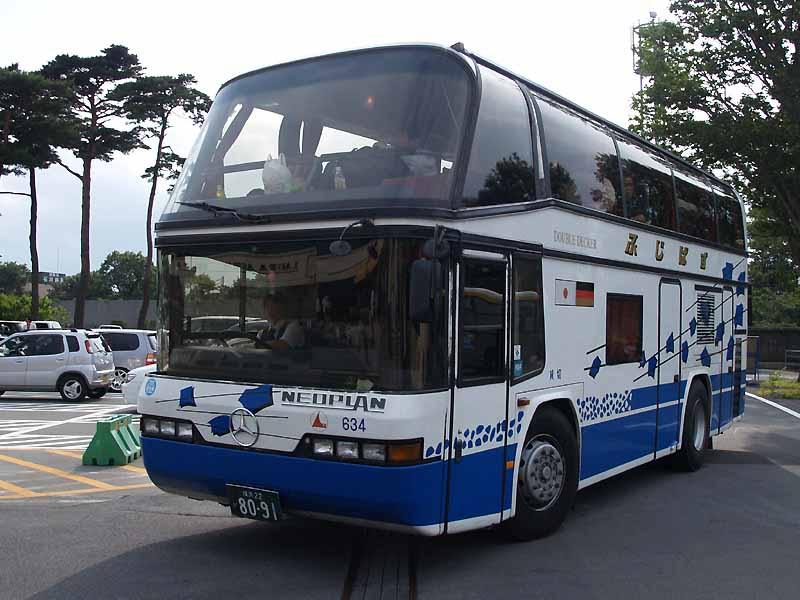
1993 model year shorter-wheelbase Skyliner N122/2 operated by Fujibus; powertrain supplied by Mercedes-Benz

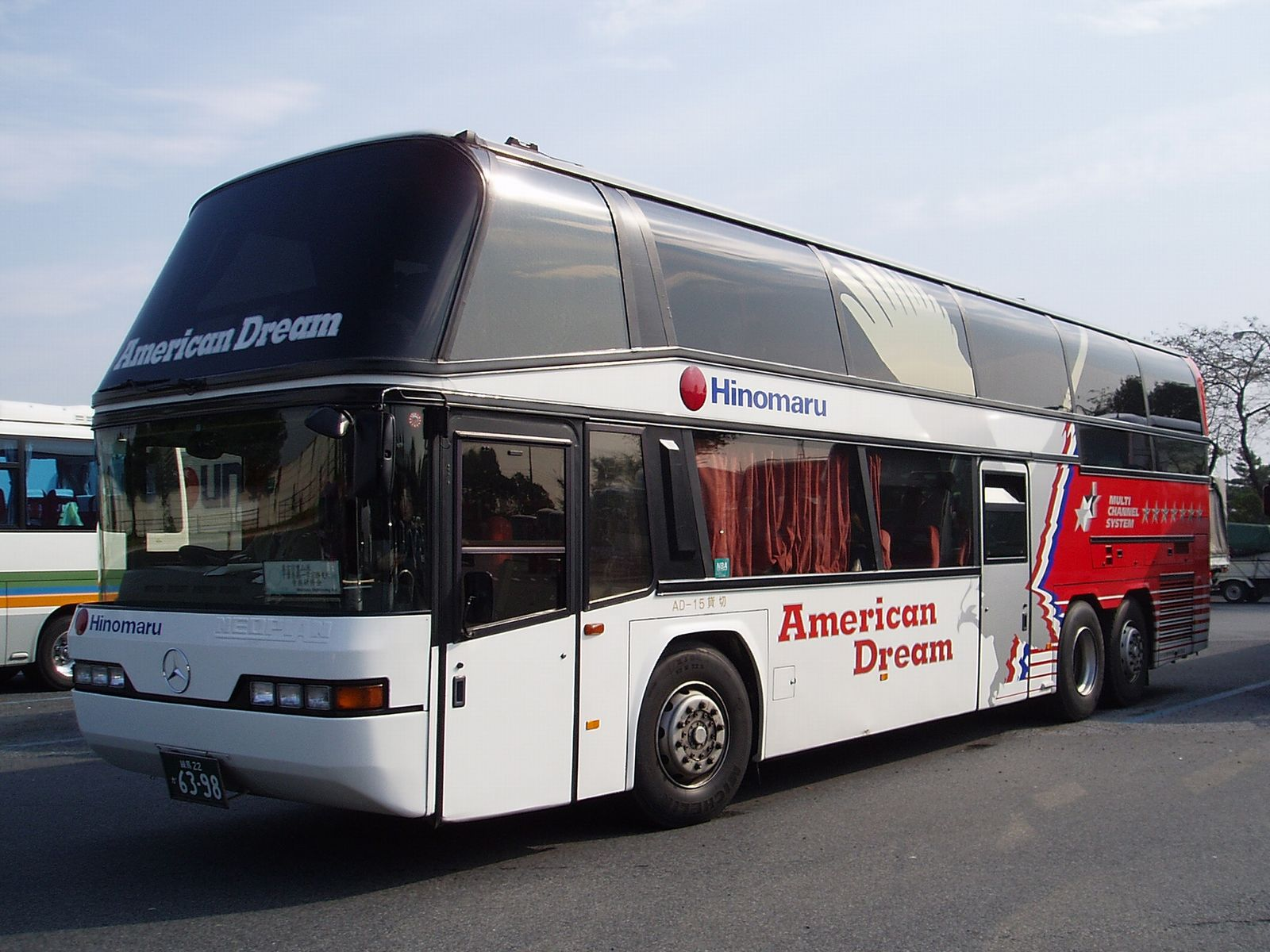
1994 model year Skyliner N122/3 operated by Hinomaru Jidōsha Kōgyō, powertrain supplied by Mercedes-Benz

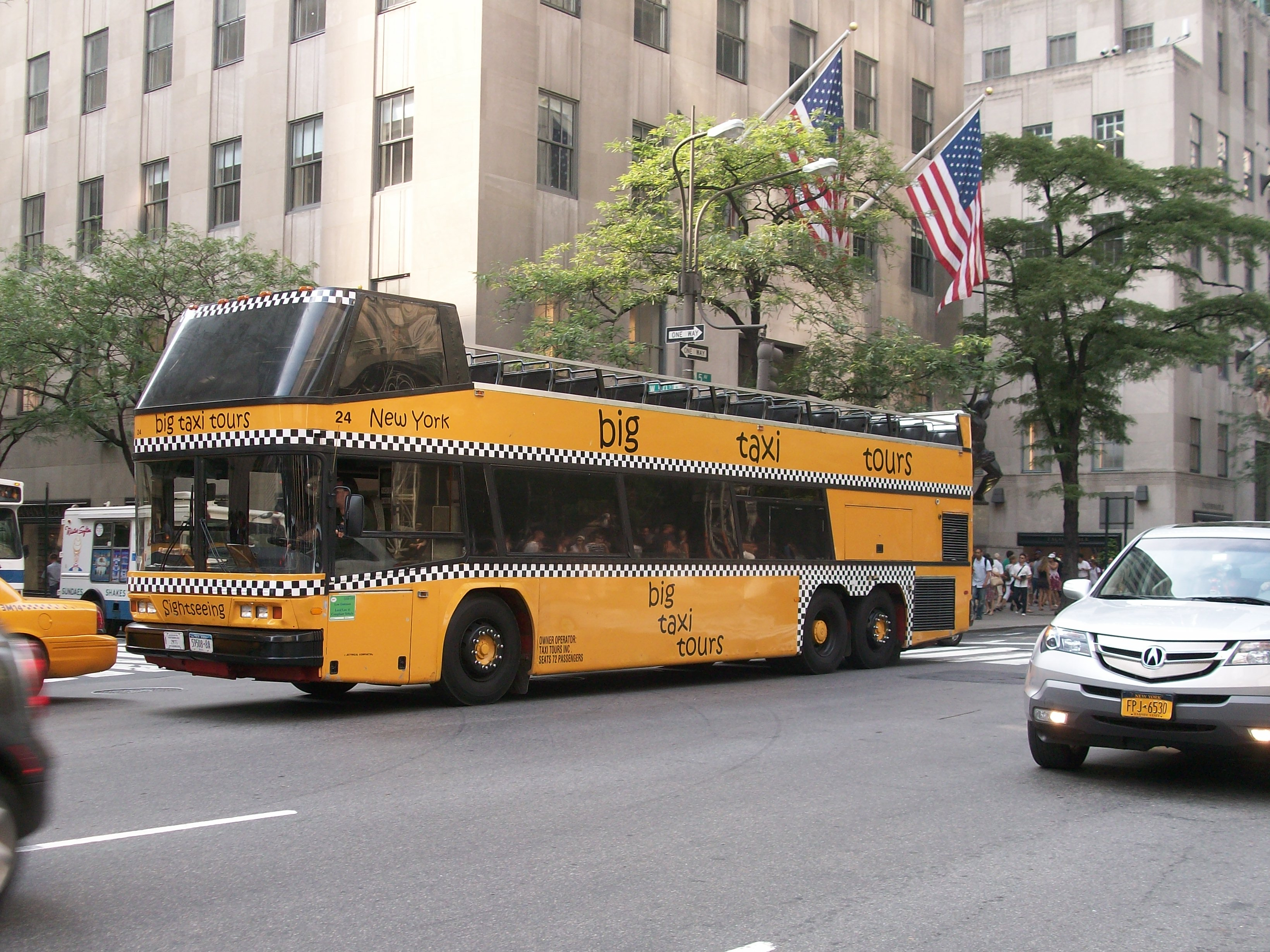
1995 model year Skyliner AN122/3 (open-top conversion) operated by Big Taxi Tours in New York City

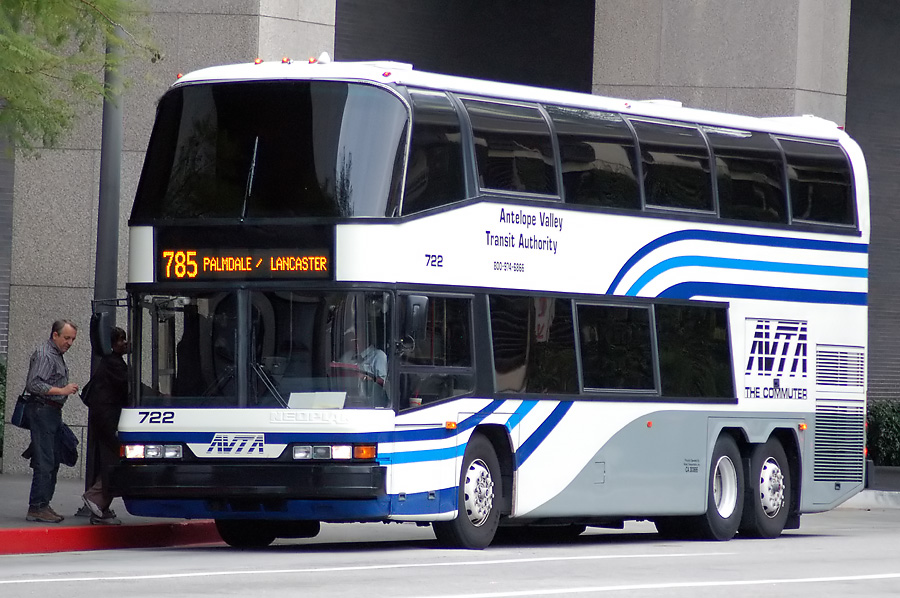
1996 model year Skyliner AN122/3 operated by Antelope Valley Transit Authority (ATVA) in Los Angeles

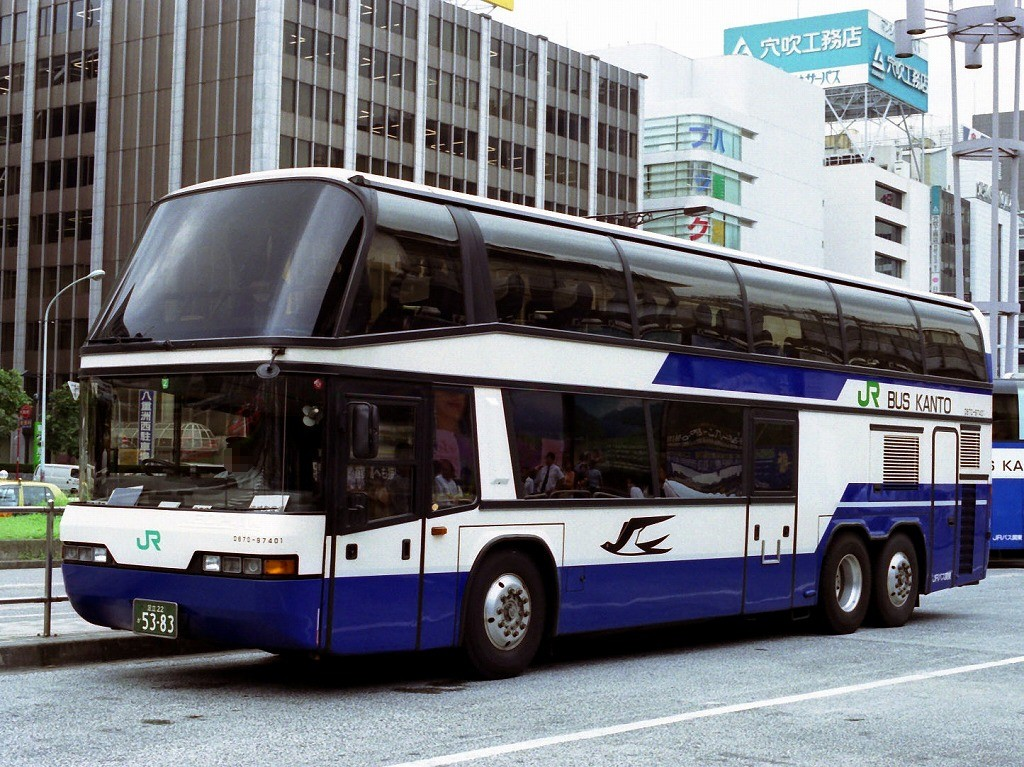
1997 model year Skyliner N122/3 operated by JR Bus Kanto in Tokyo

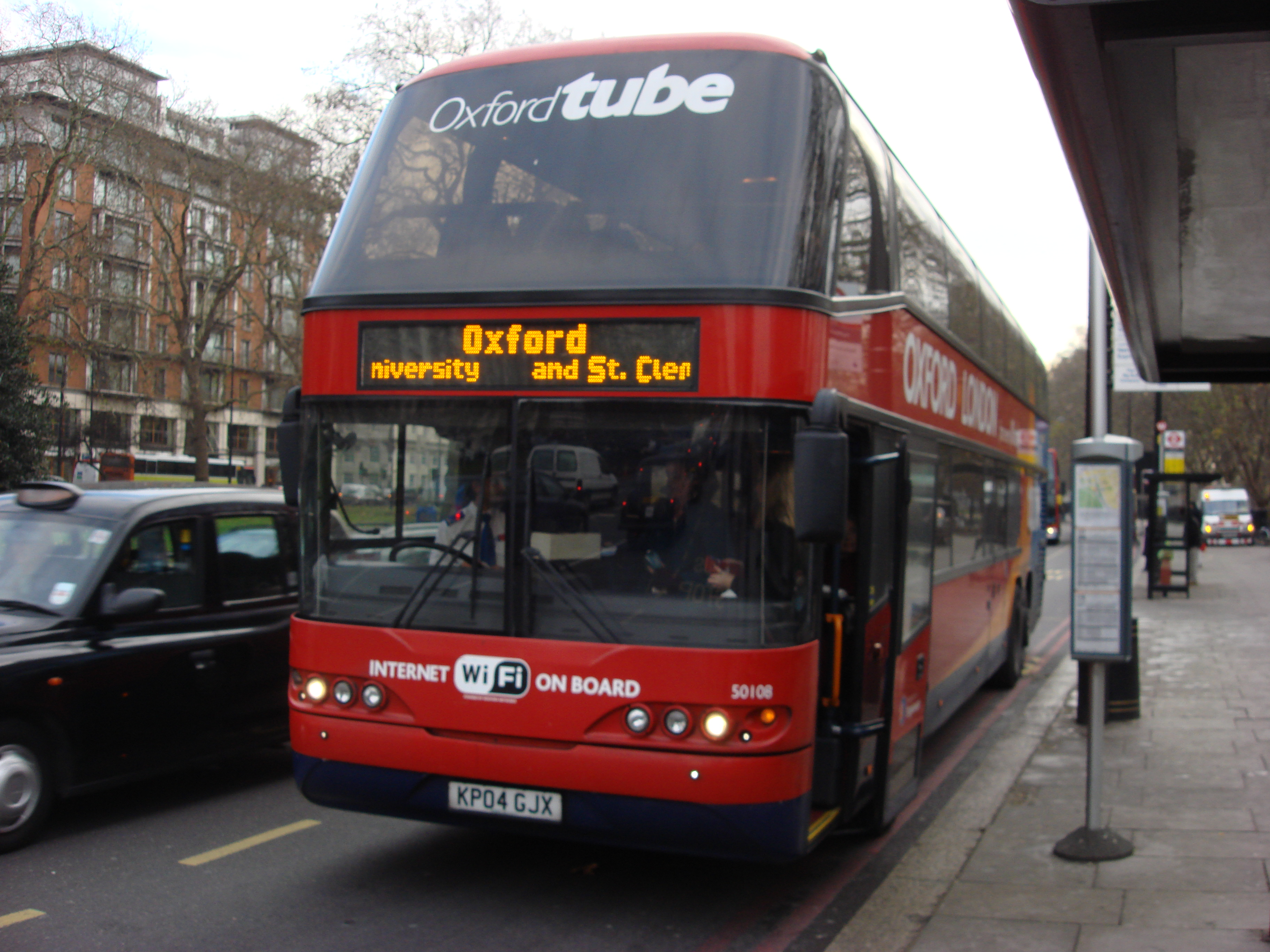
2004 model year Stagecoach Oxfordshire Skyliner operating on the Oxford Tube route

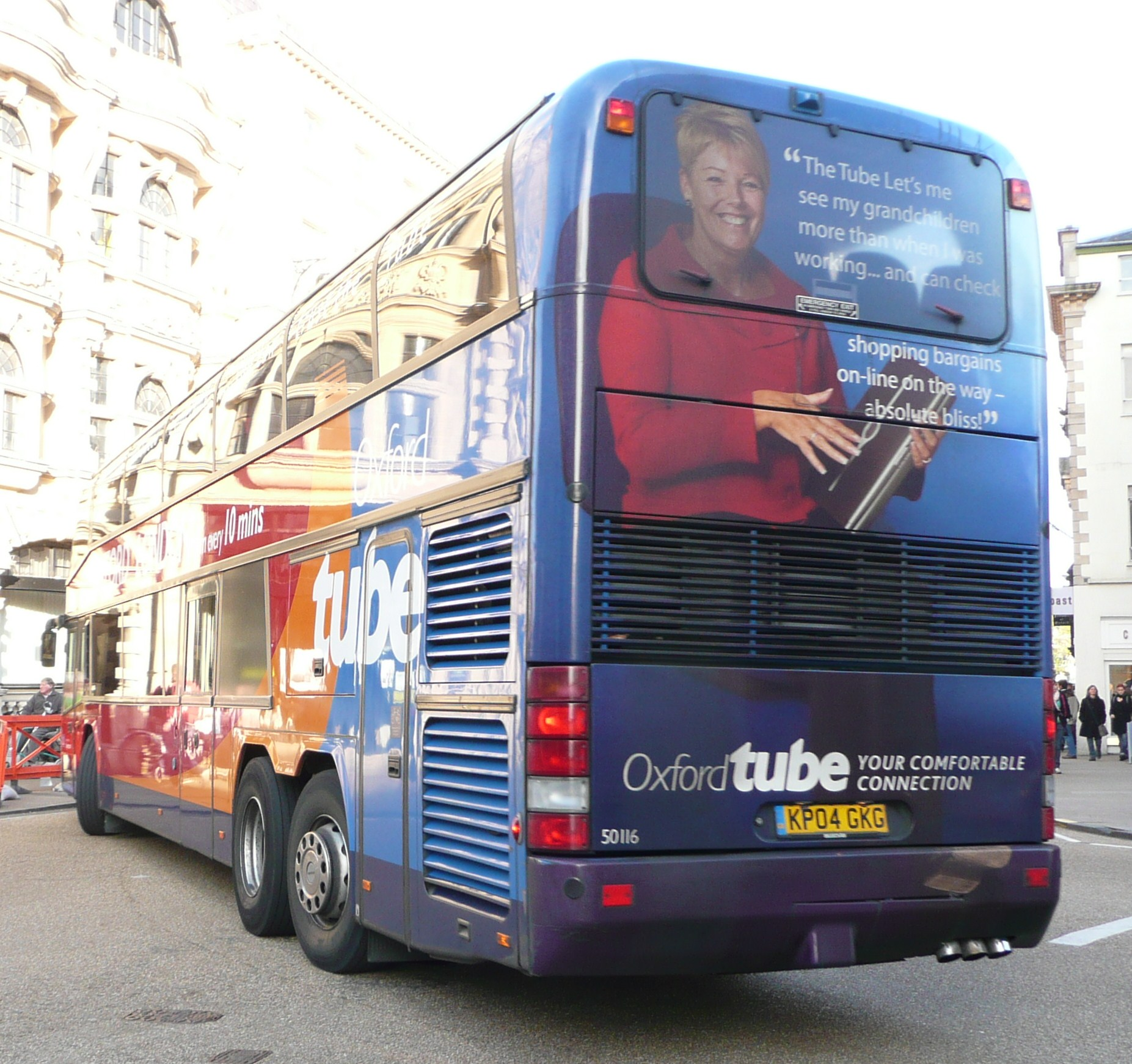
Rear of 2004 model year Stagecoach Oxfordshire Skyliner operating on the Oxford Tube route

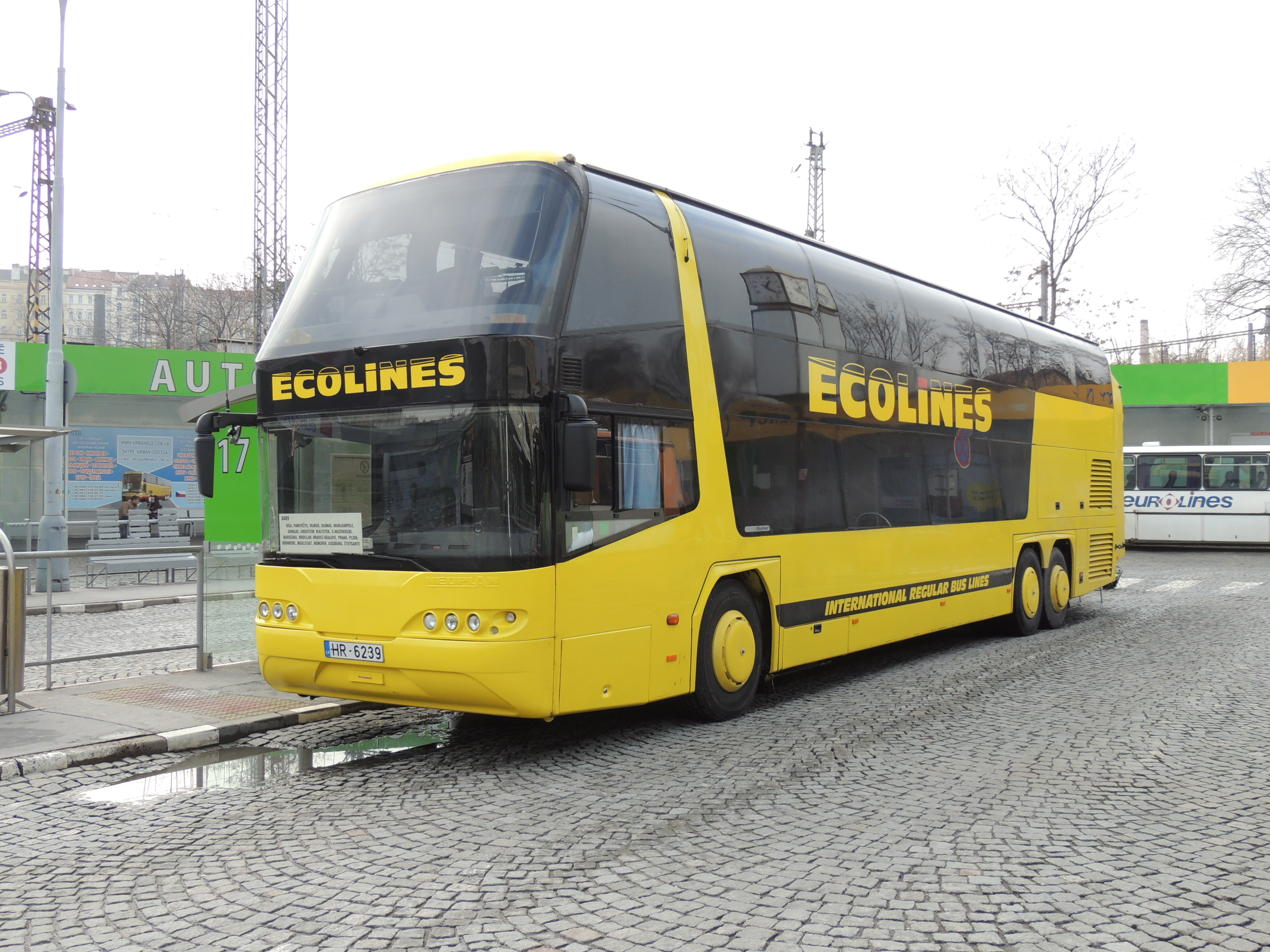
2007 model year Skyliner N1122/3L operated by Ecolines at Florenc Central Bus Station, Prague

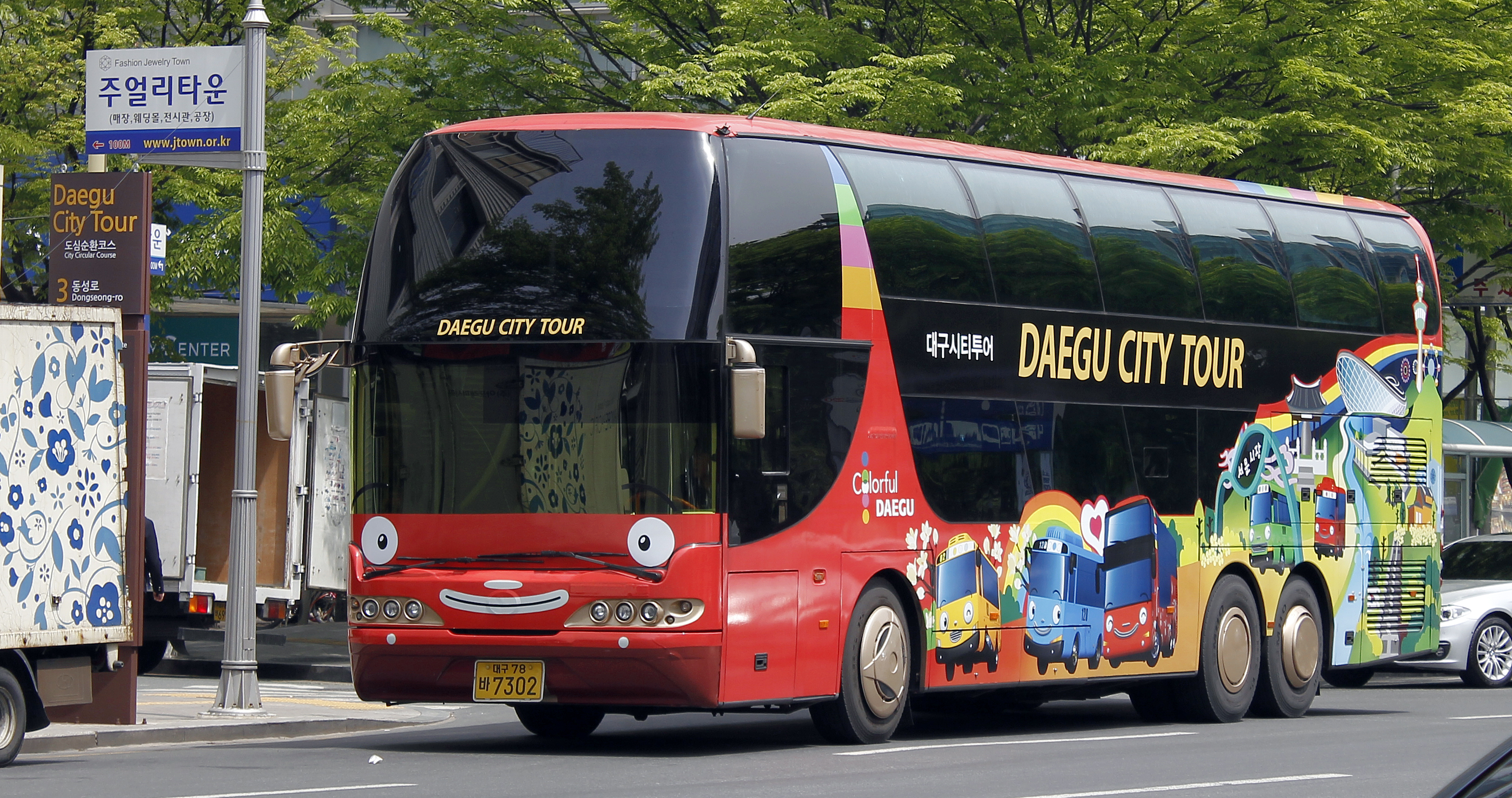
Late-2000s Skyliner N1122/3C operated by Daegu City Tour Bus (ko) in South Korea

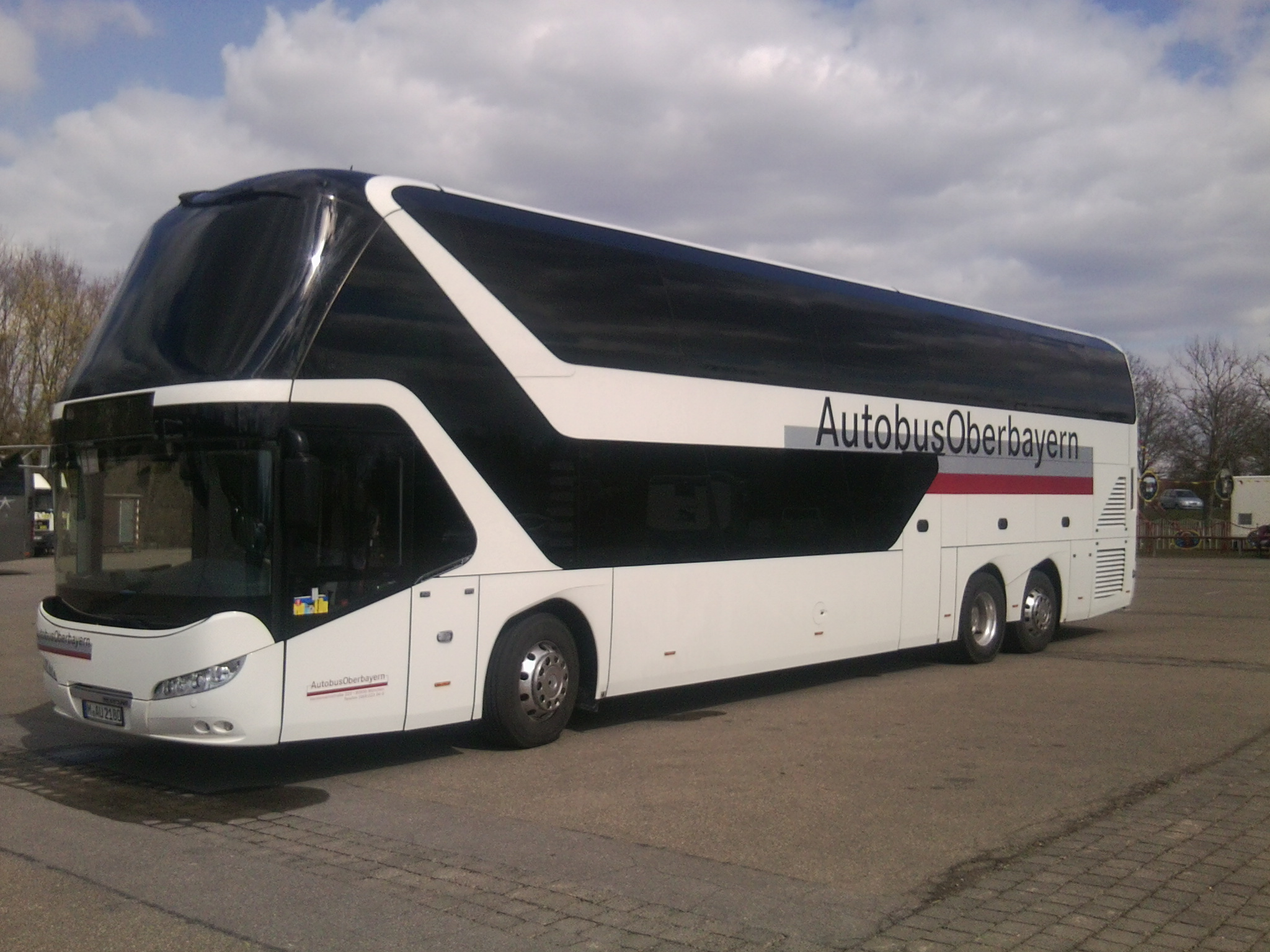
2011 model year Skyliner L N1222 operated by AutobusOberbayern in Germany

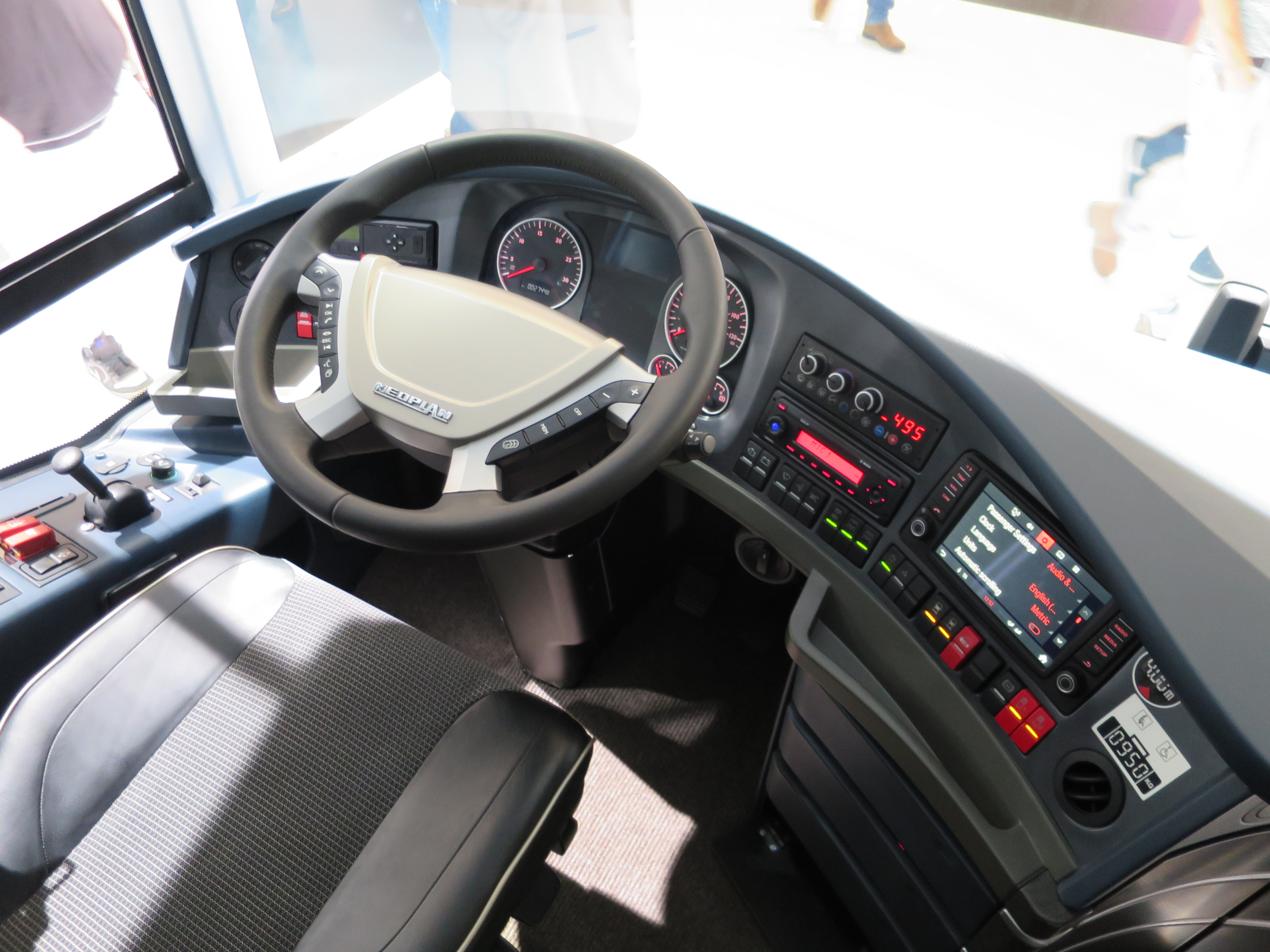
Driver's cab of a Skyliner L N1222 exhibited at the 2016 International Motor Show Germany

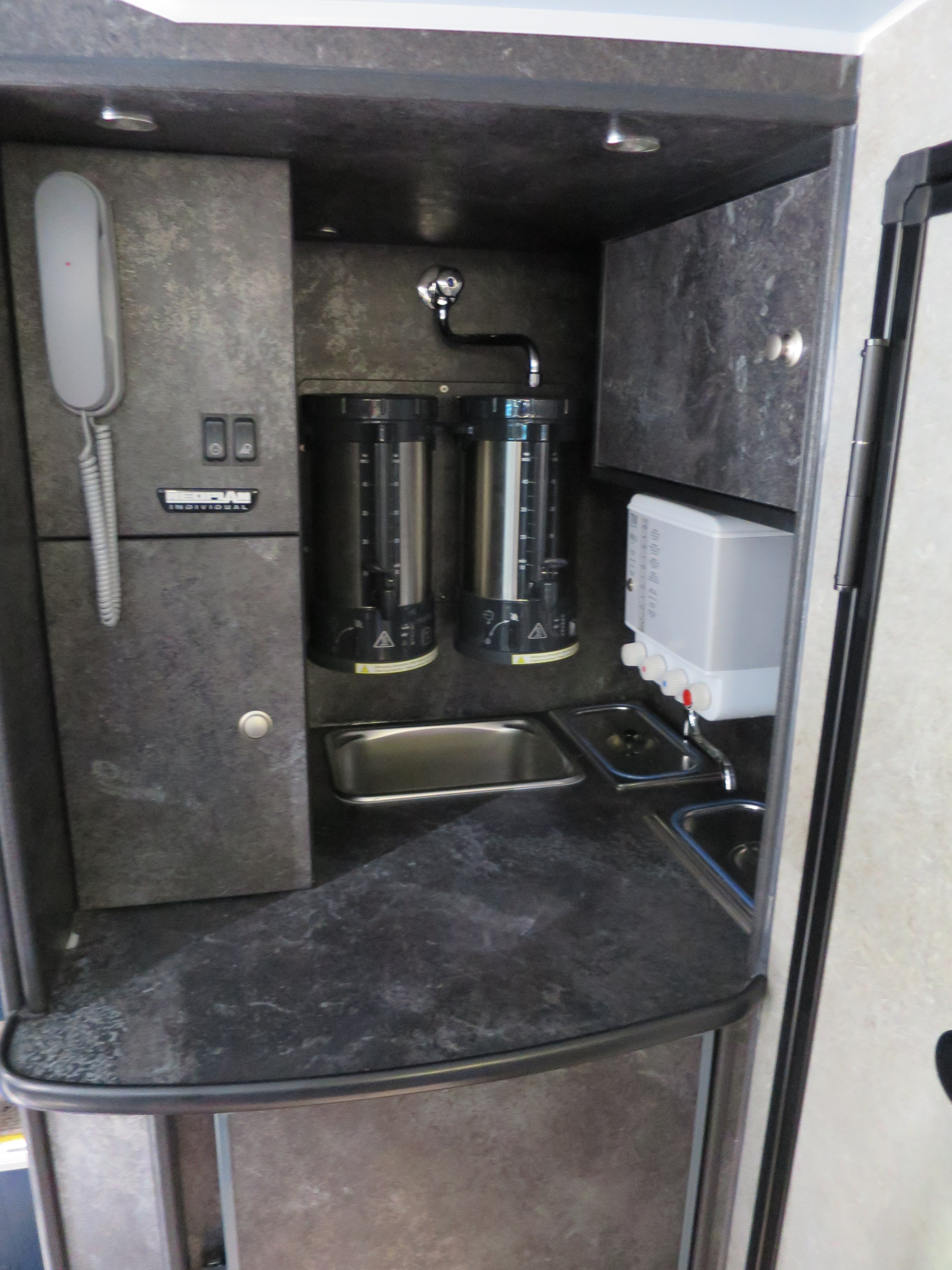
Kitchenette of a Skyliner L N1222
