= Neoplan =

German bus and coach manufacturer

Neoplan Bus GmbH
- Type: Division
- Industry: Automotive
- Founded: July 1, 1935; 91 years ago
- Founder: Gottlob Auwärter
- Headquarters: Stuttgart, Germany
- Area served: Worldwide
- Key people: Joachim Reinmuth (chairman of the board of management) former designers: Albrecht Auwärter, Bob Lee, Konrad Auwärter
- Products: Buses; Coaches; Trolleybuses
- Number of employees: 1,300
- Parent: MAN Truck & Bus SE
- Website: neoplan.com

Neoplan Bus GmbH is a German automotive company that manufactures buses, trolleybuses and coaches. It became a subsidiary of MAN Truck & Bus SE in 2001.

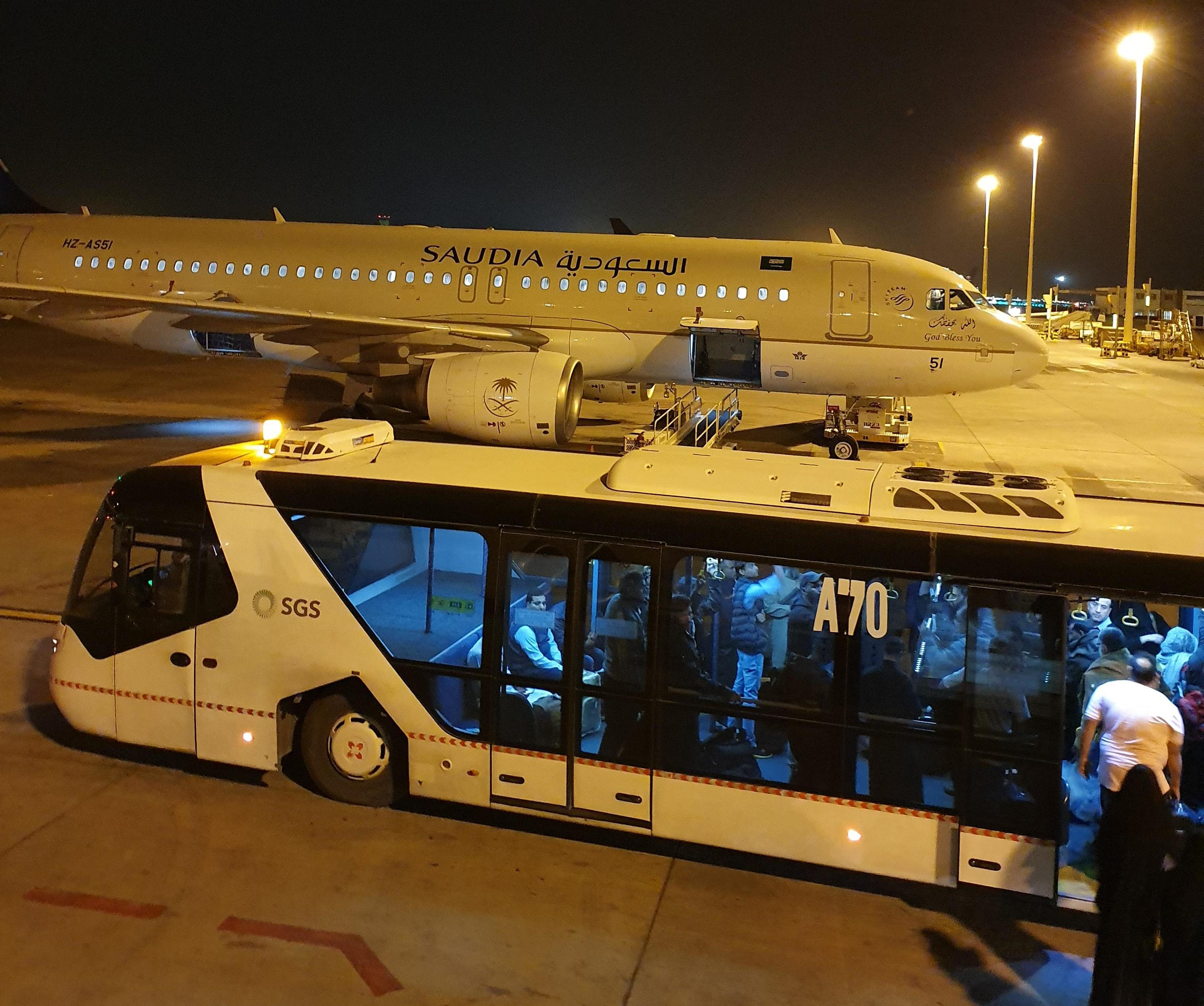
Neoplan Airport bus

== History ==
=== Early days ===
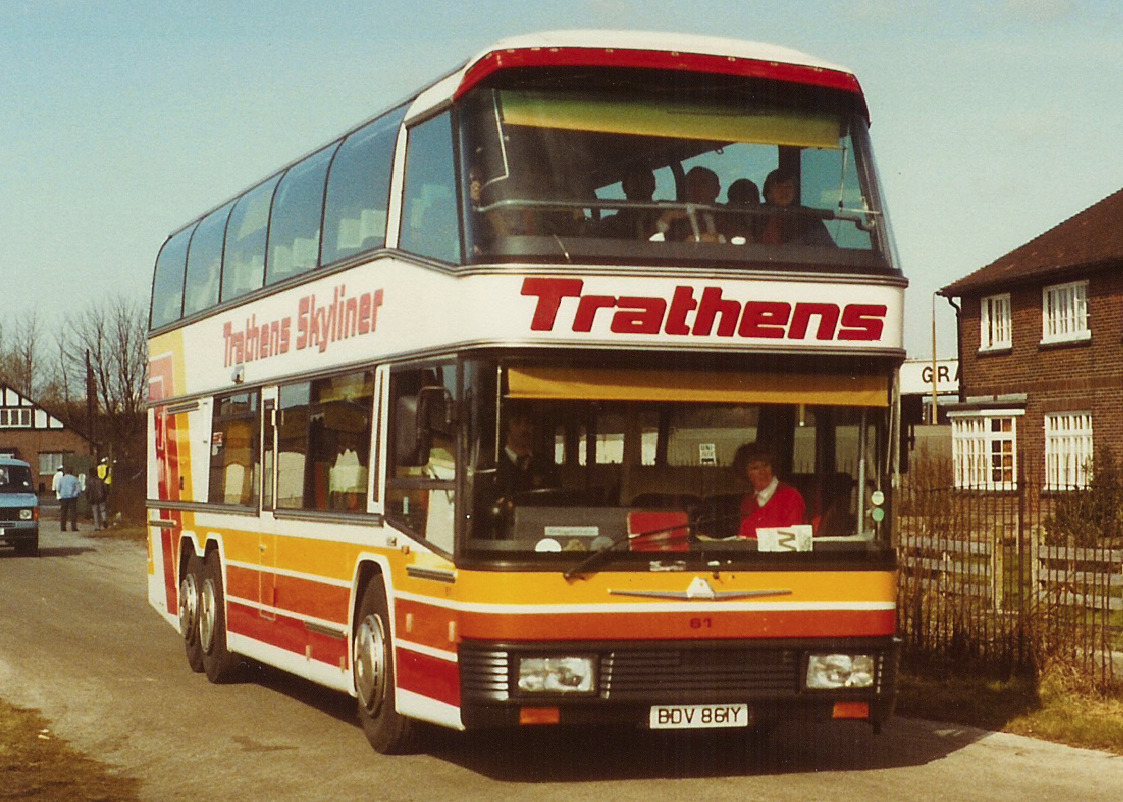
Trathens Travel Services, Plymouth 1983 Neoplan Skyliner

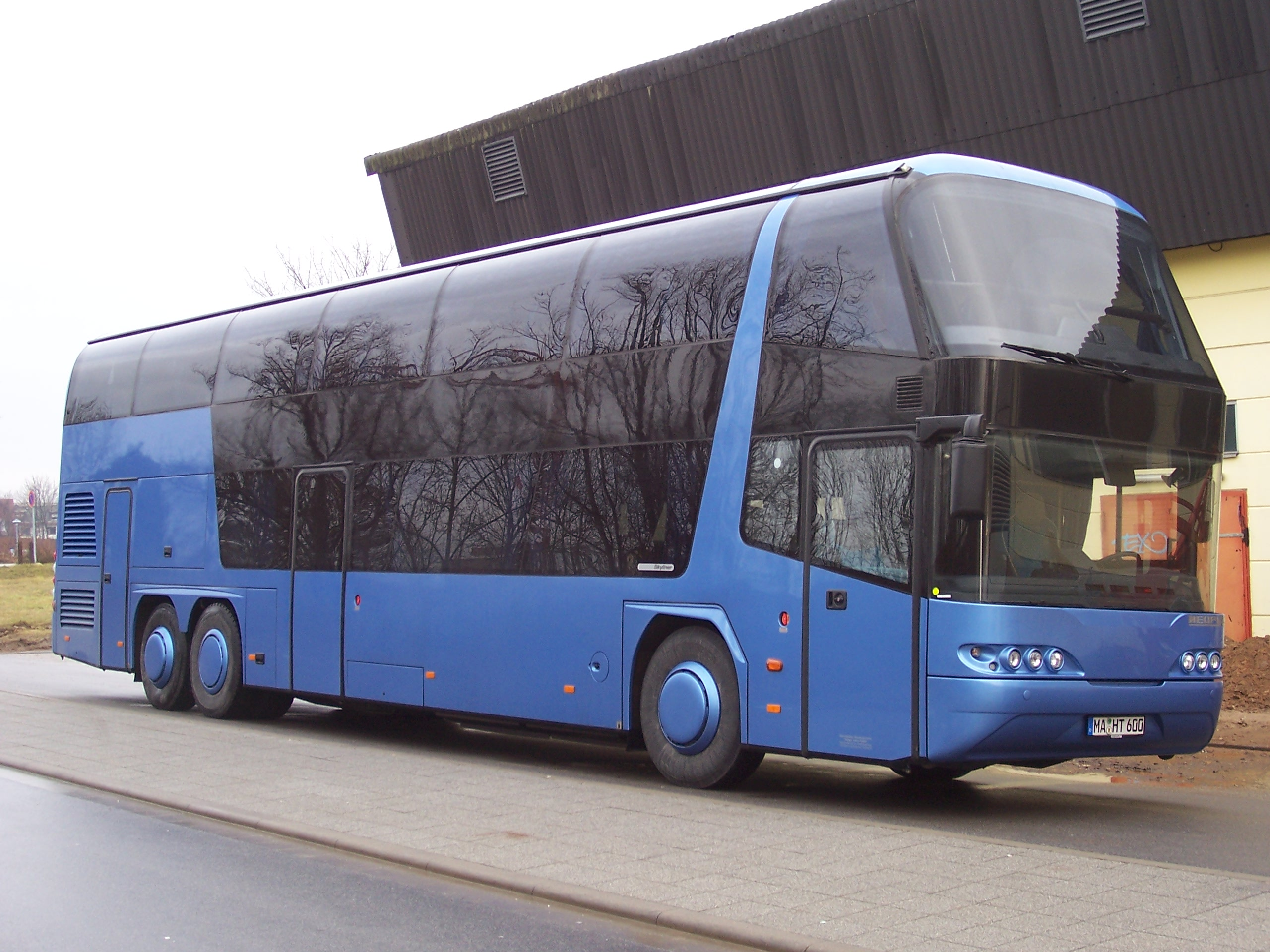
Neoplan Skyliner in February 2006

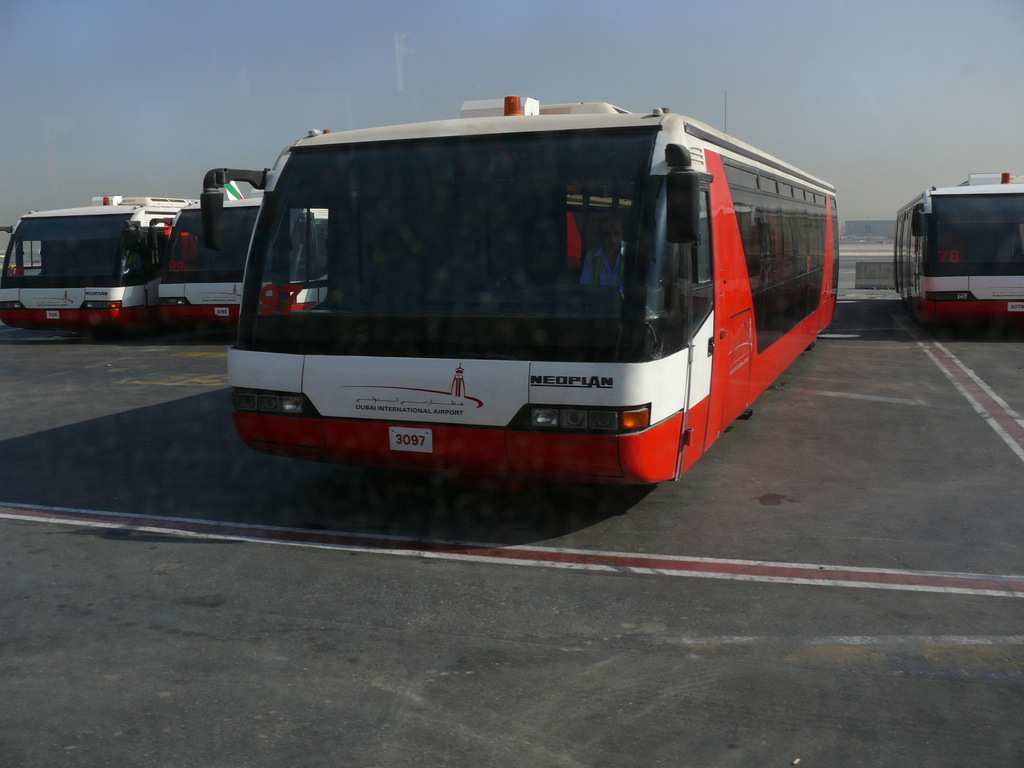
Neoplan Airliner at Dubai International Airport, 2007

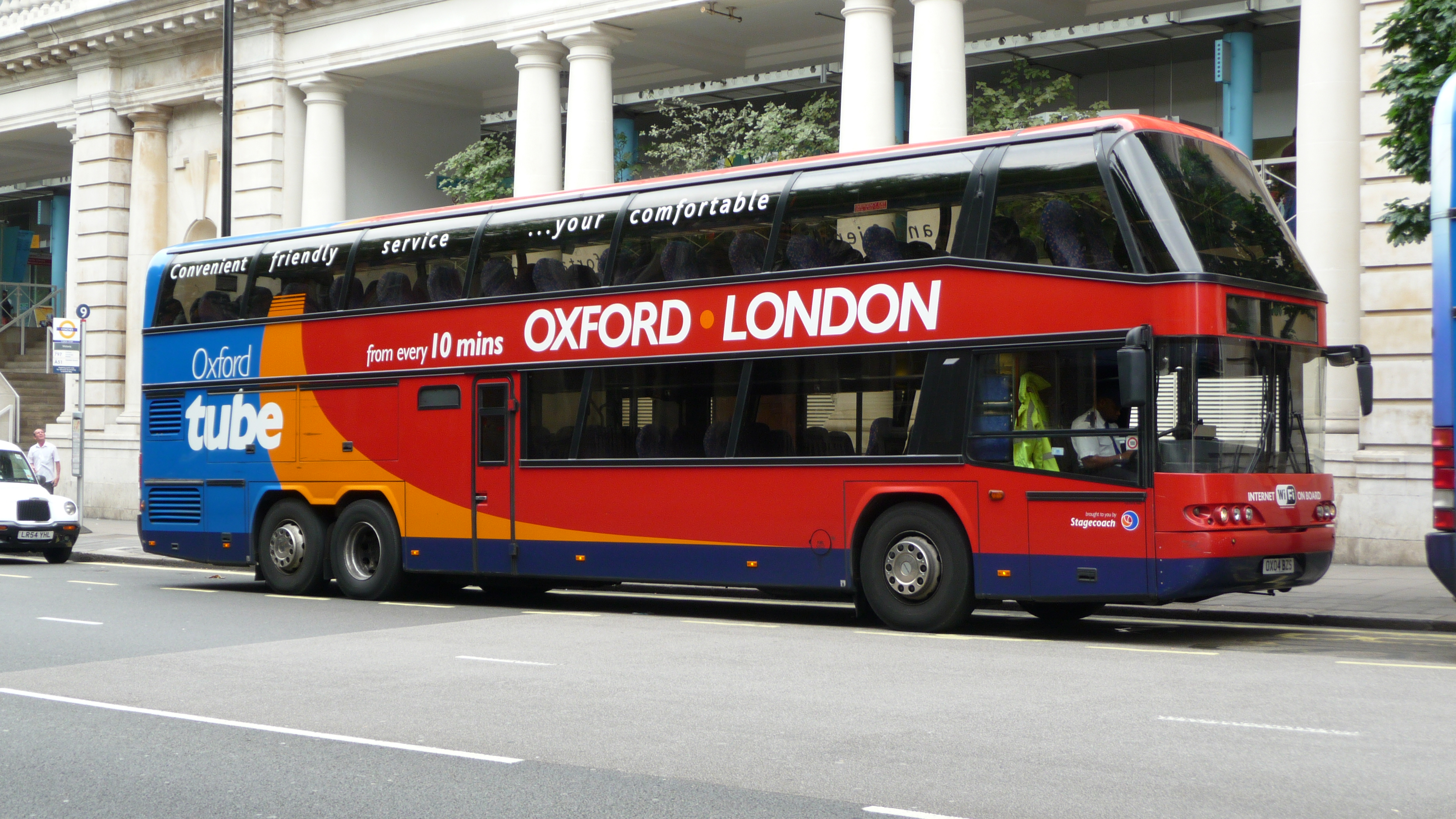
Stagecoach Oxfordshire Neoplan Skyliner in June 2009

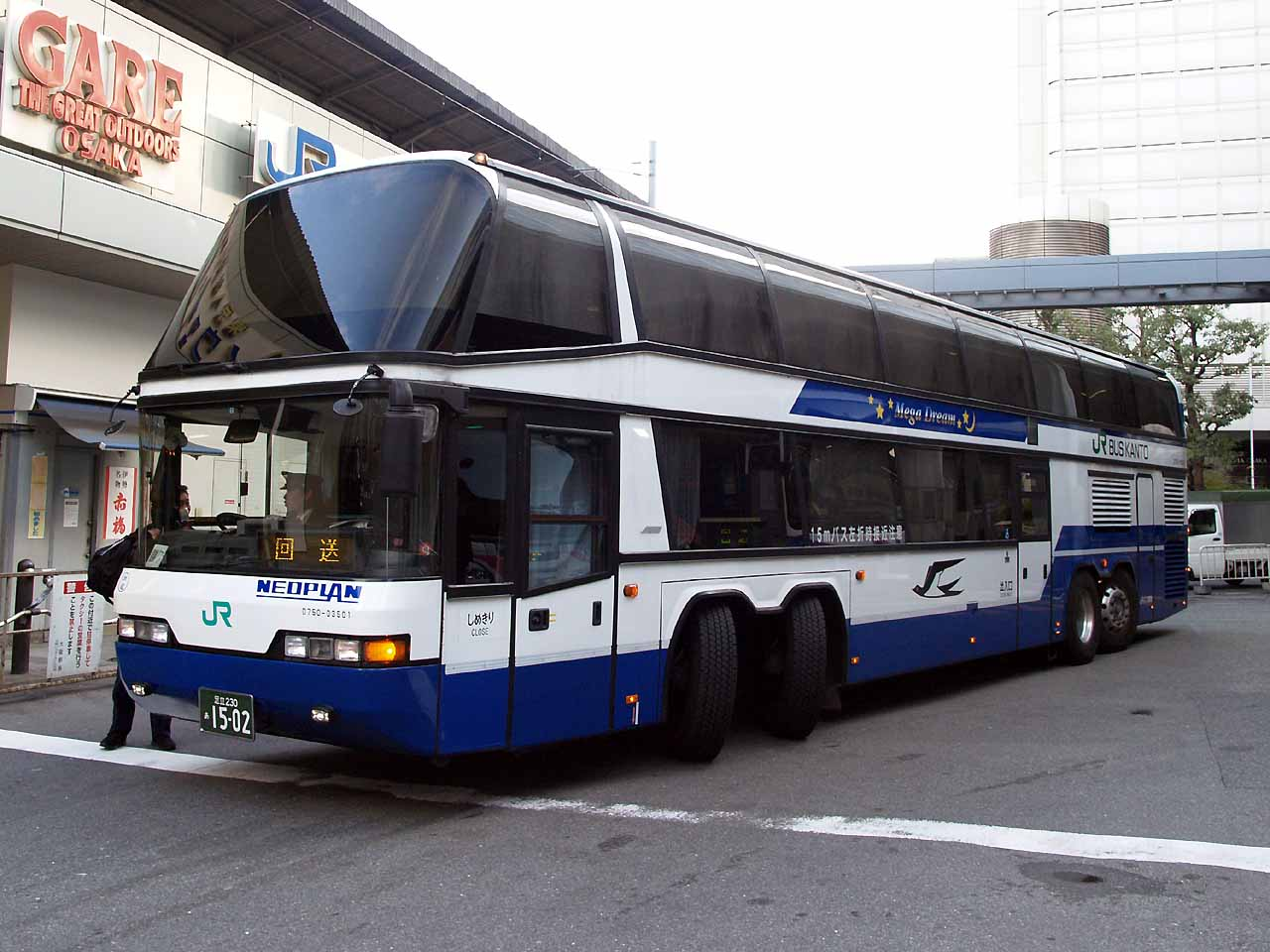
Neoplan Megaliner in Japan

The company was founded by Gottlob Auwärter (1903–1993) in Stuttgart in 1935, and manufactured bodywork for bus and truck chassis. By 1953, the company had moved away from manufacturing buses on truck chassis, to a partial monocoque design with a steel tube skeleton, providing the structural support, enhanced by welded side panels. The engine was moved to the rear. In 1957, air suspension was made available.

=== 1960s ===
In 1961, a new bus design, the Typ Hamburg, was unveiled at the Geneva Motor Show. Developed by the founder's eldest son, Albrecht Auwärter, and another student, Swiss national Bob Lee, as part of their dissertation at Hamburg University, the design was the first bus to allow passengers to regulate their fresh air supply through a nozzle from two air ducts, commonly seen in contemporary designs, as well as offering air suspension.

Both Albrecht and Lee joined Neoplan after graduating from university. Albrecht took over management of the company in 1965, and Bob Lee later became head of Engineering and Design.

In 1964, the founder's second son, Konrad Auwärter, developed a double-deck bus design for a service bus as part of his dissertation. The "Do-Bus" design had low weight, and could carry over 100 passengers. It also featured a low-frame front axle with forward-mounted steering gear that permitted a low, flat floor. The double-deck principle was applied to the coach design, creating a high-capacity, comfortable touring vehicle. This vehicle was known as the Skyliner.

=== 1970s–1980s ===
In 1971, the Cityliner was introduced to the public. This design had a passenger platform above the driver's cab, and included an onboard toilet. The vehicle also made use of glass-fibre reinforced plastic for certain areas of the body; this was the first instance when this technique was used.

A second manufacturing facility opened in Pilsting in 1973, and a third opened in Kumasi, Ghana in December 1974 to support increasing orders.

Several more plants were added in the 1980s, including two in the United States. The United States plants were later spun off into a separate, and now defunct, independent company (Neoplan USA) that used the Neoplan name under licence. Chinese production started in 1986, originally producing North brand Neoplan buses via companies under the Norinco umbrella: this was spun off into a separate joint venture with Youngman.

=== 1990s-2000s ===
Further manufacturing facilities were opened during the 1990s and 2000s.

The Starliner was introduced in 1996, and would go on to win the Bus of the Year award for two consecutive years – in 1998 and 1999.

In 1999 the company unveiled a prototype fuel cell bus.

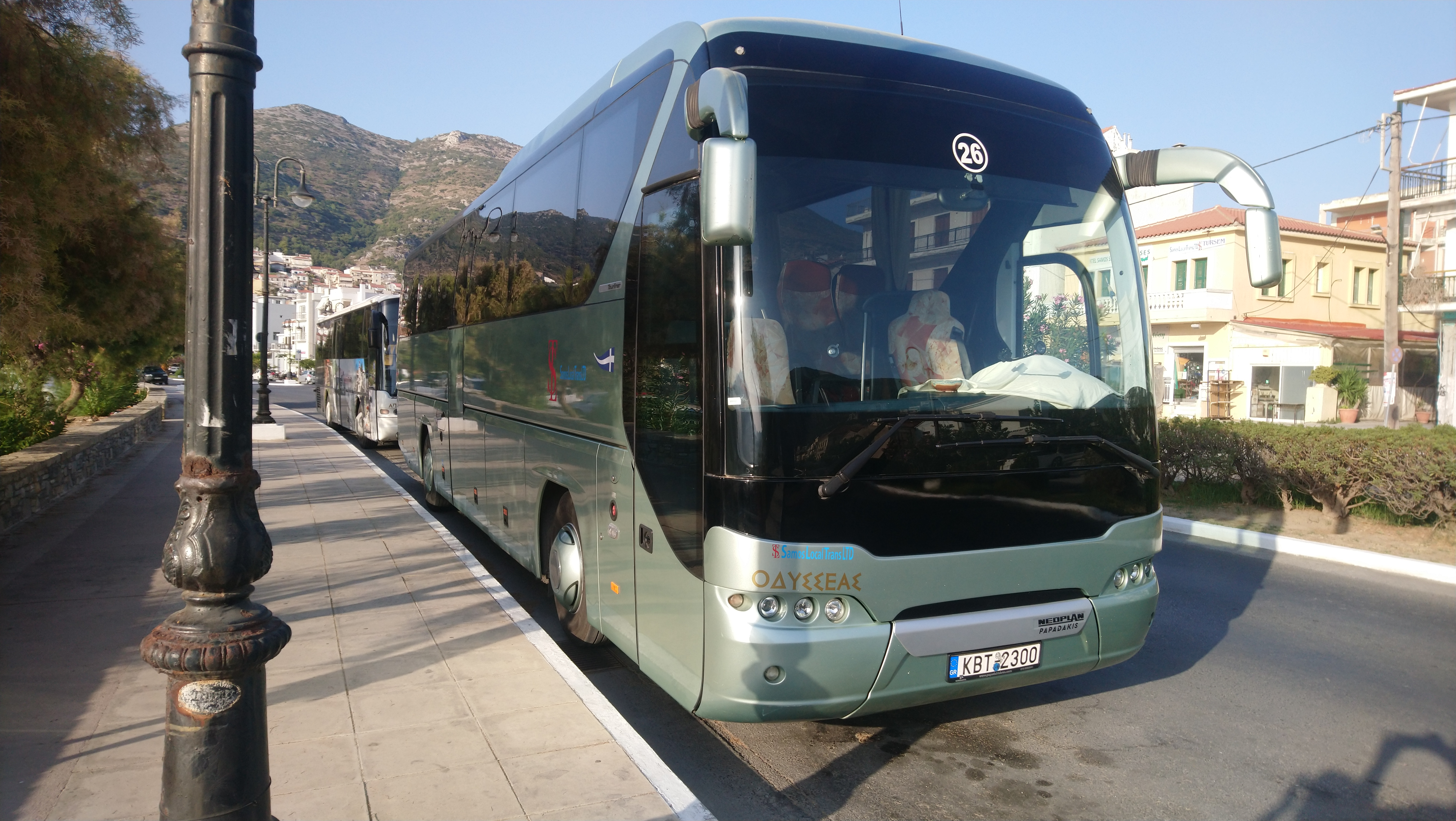
Neoplan Tourliner (Samos island, Greece) in August 2022

In 2001, Neoplan, or correctly, "Gottlob Auwärter GmbH & Co KG" was acquired by MAN AG subsidiary MAN Nutzfahrzeuge AG to form Neoman Bus GmbH. The Starliner won the Bus of the Year award for two more consecutive years in 2001 and 2002.

In 2008, the Gottlob Auwärter Museum was opened in Stuttgart, opposite the headquarters of Stuttgarter Straßenbahnen AG.

On 1 February 2008, Neoman Bus GmbH was fully integrated into the bus division of the larger MAN Nutzfahrzeuge Group, and ceased to exist in its own right. Neoplan and MAN Truck & Bus began operating as two separate but integrated marques of MAN Nutzfahrzeuge Group.

== Products ==
=== Buses ===
- Cityliner
- Electroliner (electric trolleybus)
- Neoplan Airliner (airport apron bus, 1960–present)
- Skyliner
- Tourliner

=== Discontinued models ===
- Centroliner (low-floor bus; 1997–2009)
- Typ Hamburg (1961)
- Megaliner
- Jumbocruiser
- Cityliner (1971)
- Jetliner (1973)
- Spaceliner
- Skyliner 67 (1965)
- Metroliner
- Starliner C/L
- Transliner
- Trendliner
- Tropicliner
- Euroliner
- Megashuttle

== See also ==
- Neoplan USA, defunct US subsidiary
- 2013 Podgorica bus crash
- Langenbruck bus crash
