= Trathens Travel Services =

British bus and coach company

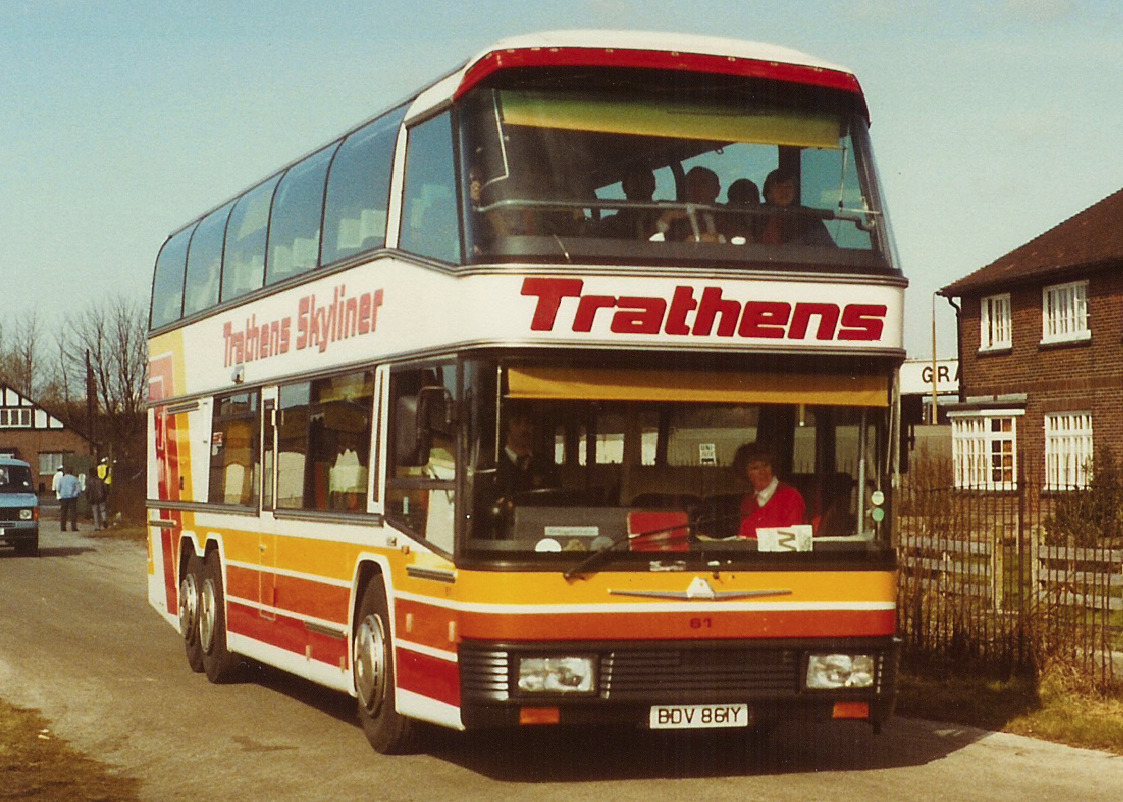
- Neoplan Skyliner at Yelverton depot circa 1983
- Parent: Park's Motor Group
- Ceased operation: 2009
- Service type: Long distance coach operator
- Fleet: 33 (May 2009)

Trathens Travel Services was a Devon (England) based bus and coach operator, taken over in 1996 by Scottish-based Park's Motor Group. The family owned group came to national attention after running express coach services from Plymouth to London, in light of the Transport Act 1980.

== History ==
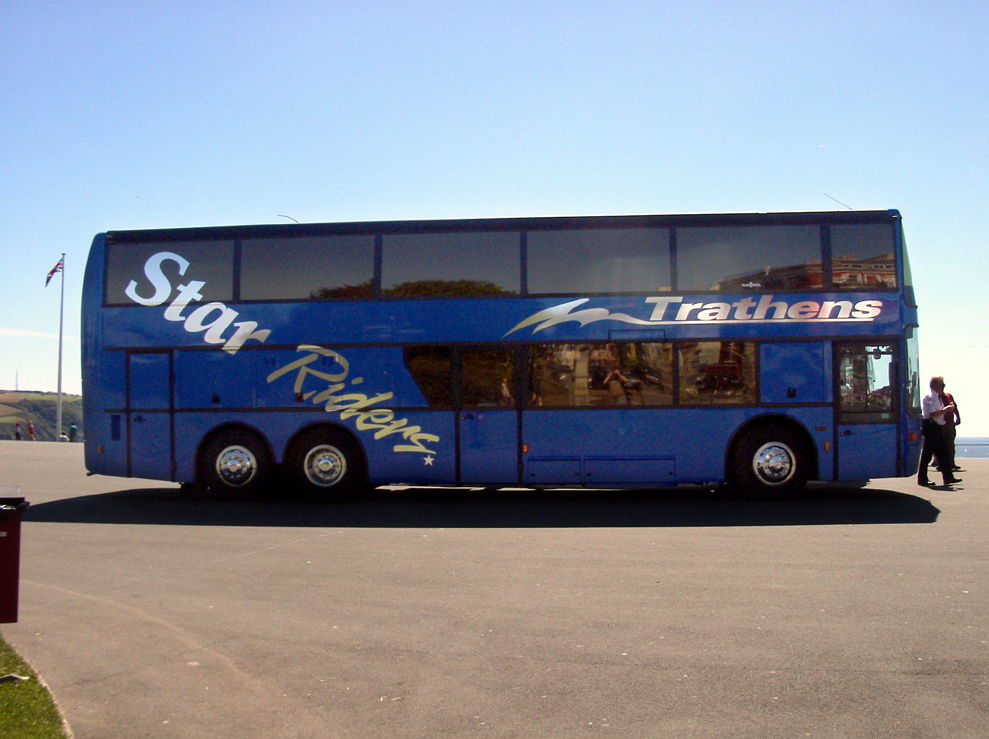
Trathens StarLiner at the Western National Rally, Plymouth 28 July 2002

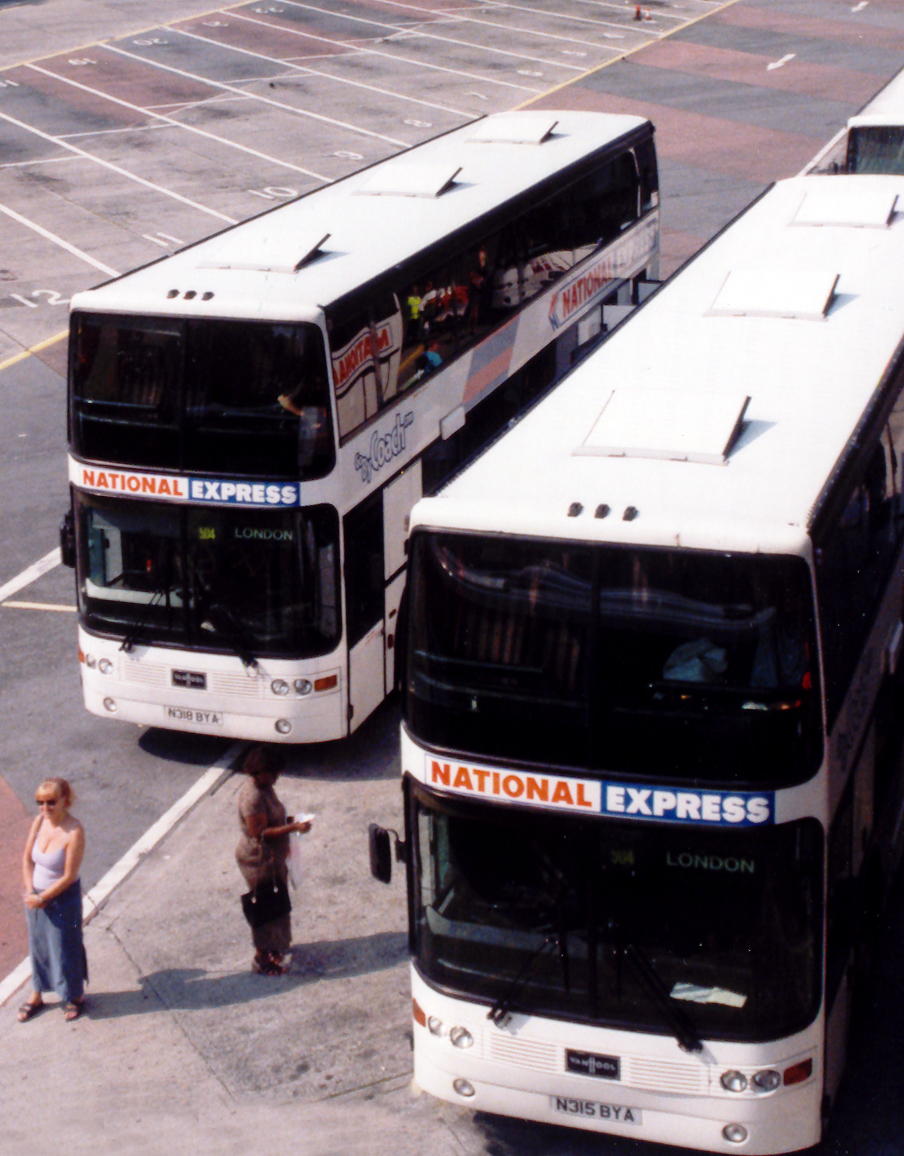
National Express liveried double-deck Van Hool coaches in Plymouth in 2001

Post-World War II, Dartmoor farmer Frederick Trathen and his son Eric drove their lorry, containing produce, to the market 13 miles (21 km) away in Plymouth. In 1946, he started carrying locals on the trip, and then due to increasing demand installed a wooden trestle bench. The service proved so popular, that Trathen's bought a second-hand 1933 Bedford WLB 20 seater for £100, with which they also ran weekend trips to Torquay.

By 1950 and now based in Yelverton, the company had six Bedford coaches, and had bought its first new chassis, a Bedford OB. Expanding locally in the 1950s with at least one new chassis per year, from 1960 they ran their first holiday service to the Netherlands. The business now existed in three divisions: bus and coach services; excursion; and private hire, including services for Plymouth Argyle Football Club.

From the 1970s, Eric's sons Mike and David began running the business, which was by now expanding with four new chassis per year. The business at this time was mainly expanding through its excursion services, which used continental-style coach bodies build on traditional British chassis. However, by the late 1970s the company had bought its first Neoplan chassis, which prepared it for the expansion possibilities brought about by the Transport Act 1980.

With deregulation of coach services in the UK, and introduction of the new InterCity 125 service from 1976 by British Rail, Trathens began an executive high-speed express coach service from Plymouth direct to London. Running mainly up the M5 motorway to Bristol, the coaches then turned east along the M4 motorway to London via Swindon and Reading. Using mainly the new Neoplan Skyliner double decker, the service offered on-board light refreshments and newspapers, a hostess and toilets. The relatively low-priced service compared to the rival National Express, in a style more akin to the new InterCity 125 trains, brought about fast expansion for the family-owned firm.

In October 1982, the company bought Roborough House on the edge of Dartmoor, which became its new headquarters and operational base. The 12 acres (4.9 ha) site was developed with an airport-style coach holiday departure lounge, large car park, and 1,200 square metres (13,000 sq ft) workshop, with associated paint shop, offices and stores. With the fleet fast expanding, and the company adding new direct to London service access points along both the M4 and M5 - Exeter, Salisbury, Taunton, Bristol, Cardiff, Swansea and Swindon proving most popular - the company now employed a full-time sign writer. The company also opened a new London depot in Brentford, allowing both: expansion into the international tourist market, for those coming into the UK via London Heathrow and Gatwick Airports; as well as the founding of StarRiders a well known sleeper bus operator.

Having beaten National Express on price and service grounds, the two companies now signed a co-operation agreement, with National Express marketing Trathens services under a joint-brand. Trathens had also greatly expanded its excursion operations, with weekly services into all of the major holiday destinations in Europe, as well as a West Country-based chain of direct-marketing travel agencies.

The fast contraction of the business came about after a series of high-profile accidents from the mid-1990s onwards, involving drivers who were later found to be in excess of their allocated work hours, and various fraudulent acts associated with tachograph operations at both a driver and company level. Unable to now offer competitive direct-to-London services on either a time or cost basis, and with its brand tarnished and PSA operator's licence restricted, the group began to quickly contract, and was, in 1996, sold to Scottish-based Park's Motor Group. Following another series of tachograph- related court cases brought by the Vehicle & Operator Services Agency, Park's dropped the Trathen's brand in 2009. Roborough House was sold-off, and is now a specialist private neurological care unit.
