= Park's Motor Group =

Scottish motor dealership group

Park's of Hamilton (Holdings) Ltd.
- Type: Private
- Founded: 1971
- Headquarters: Hamilton, Lanarkshire, Scotland, UK
- Key people: Douglas Park
- Website: www.parks.uk.com

Park's Motor Group is a private family-owned business which is one of the largest privately owned motor dealership groups in Scotland, representing 26 manufacturers. They are also partners in the Motability scheme, offering cars to disabled road users.

In addition to motor vehicle retailing, the company has a luxury coach hire service under the name Park's of Hamilton, and operates scheduled services in Scotland and England.

Park's Motor Group also operates four petrol forecourts, two large body repair centres in Hillington and East Kilbride, and a fast-fit outlet as well as one of the largest trade parts wholesaling operations in Scotland.

== History ==
Douglas Park founded the business in 1971 initially as a small, three-coach operation. In 1977, the company diversified into the motor trade with their first Datsun franchise in Hamilton, before adding a second a year later in Strathaven. From this point on, the business began to grow in the motor trade and by 1986 were appointed agents for Honda and BMW. In 1992, Park's Motor Group opened the UK's first multi-franchise complex in East Kilbride which featured Citroën, Fiat, Honda, Kia, Nissan, Renault and Suzuki.

In 1998, investment in Ayrshire led to the acquisition of seven more showrooms. Subsequently, in 2003, Park's Motor Group completed the development of Scotland's first P.A.G (Premier Automotive Group) site which added Volvo, Jaguar and Land Rover to a growing list of franchises.

In 2004, Park's Motor Group opened a Renault dealership in Fife. In 2006, the company acquired Henry Bros BMW businesses in Glasgow and Hillington, securing their position as Scotland's largest BMW group. In 2009, Park's Motor Group became Scotland's only official Overfinch distributor, which specialises in bespoke Range Rovers.

In January 2011, Park's Motor Group extended its portfolio by opening Saab, in Ayr. 2012 saw further expansion as their Renault Irvine site was developed adding Fiat, Nissan, Suzuki, and Dacia to the site as well as Honda.

To complement their BMW dealerships Park's Motor Group added Douglas Park BMW Motorrad, which specialises in the sale of new and used motorcycles as well as an after-sales operation. 2013 saw the opening of another Honda dealership in Ayr.

Business was strengthened once again with the addition of a second Citroën and Kia dealership in Coatbridge, in 2014. In the same year, they added another prestigious brand to their portfolio with the addition of Maserati.

In January 2015, Park's Motor Group opened McLaren Glasgow, the first and only McLaren dealership in Scotland. McLaren Glasgow offers the entire range of new McLaren cars as well as pre-owned models and service facilities. McLaren Glasgow was named the brand's European Retailer of the Year 2015, 2016 and 2018. In 2018, Park's Motor Group opened its second McLaren dealership in Leeds.

In January 2016, Park's Motor Group completed the acquisition of Macrae & Dick. The acquisition led to the introduction of 12 new dealerships, including BMW and MINI in Stirling, Land Rover and Jaguar in Inverness and Honda in both Inverness and Aberdeen. As well as adding to their existing reputation, the takeover allowed for new partnerships to form with Ford, Mazda and Toyota, which are now represented in Inverness, Elgin, Perth and Stirling.

In March 2022, Park's Motor Group completed the acquisition of Border Motor Group. The acquisition led to the introduction of 3 new dealerships, including Toyota, Lexus, Skoda and Hyundai in Carlisle, Dumfries and St. Boswells.

== Car dealerships ==
Park's Motor Group operates a national network of car dealerships, offering a wide range of new and used cars. They offer volume brands such as Kia and Renault, as well as a number of high-end dealerships including Bentley and McLaren. Park's Motor Group has car dealerships throughout Scotland. including Glasgow, Hillington, Ayr, Irvine, Hamilton, Coatbridge, Motherwell, East Kilbride, Bathgate, Stirling, Perth, Dunfermline, Aberdeen, Inverness and Elgin. They also operate a McLaren dealership in Leeds. The 26 manufacturers offered are:

- Abarth
- Bentley
- BMW
- BMW Motorrad
- Citroën
- Dacia
- Fiat
- Ford
- Honda
- Hyundai
- Jaguar
- Kia
- Land Rover
- Maserati
- Mazda
- McLaren
- MINI
- Mitsubishi
- MG Motor
- Nissan
- Peugeot
- Renault
- Roush
- Skoda
- Suzuki
- Toyota
- Volvo

== Motability ==
Park's Motor Group are a Motability Premier Partner and offer 18 manufacturers on Motability. The Motability scheme is an initiative to provide disabled people and war pensioners access to a new car; the scheme also extends to those who suffer from cognitive behavioural disorders. Park's Motor Group have Motability specialists at dealerships throughout Scotland, including Glasgow, Ayrshire, West Lothian, Fife, Perth, Aberdeen and the Highlands.

== Coach operations ==
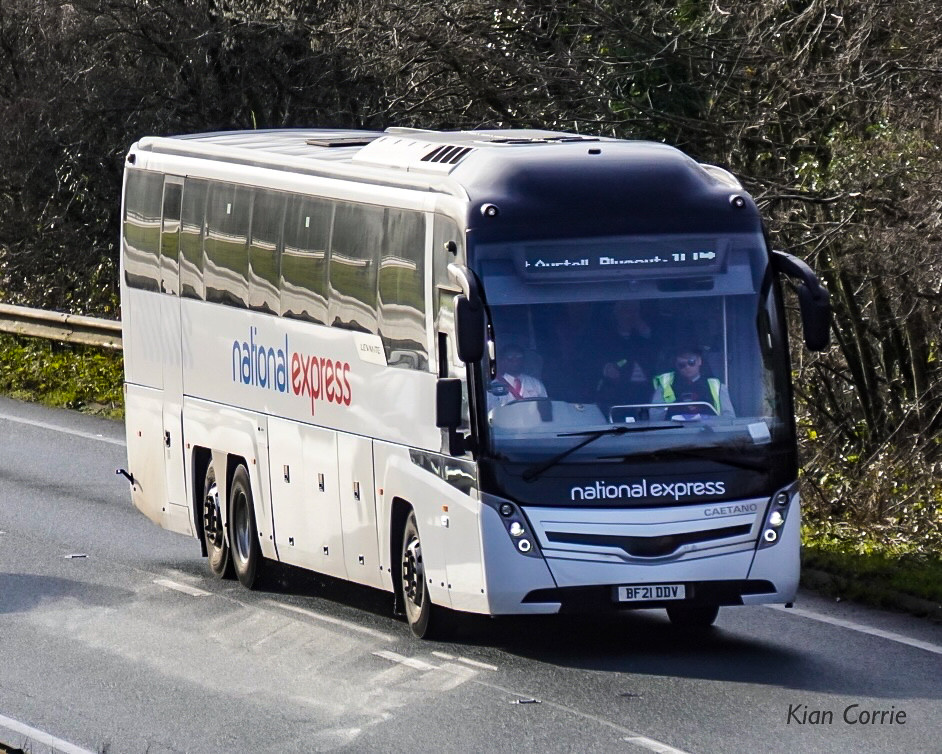
A Park's of Hamilton operated Caetano Levante, on a National Express service in 2024.

Park's of Hamilton are Scotland's leading luxury coach operators with in excess of 120 coaches, which caters for both business and leisure travel throughout Britain and Europe. In 1996 Park's of Hamilton expanded with the acquisition of Trathens Travel Services, based in Plymouth. In late 2009, the Trathens branding was dropped in favour of the Park's of Hamilton branding. The company provides VIP coaches for most Central Scotland based Scottish Premiership football teams, including Rangers, Celtic and the Scottish National Football Team.

Park's of Hamilton operates express coach services on behalf of Scottish Citylink. In 2008 Parks purchased the Glasgow to Aberdeen and Edinburgh to Inverness services of Scottish Citylink. They also operate the Glasgow to Dundee Scottish Citylink service.

Up until December 31 2025, Park's of Hamilton operated services under contract to National Express from London Victoria Coach Station to Plymouth, Newquay and Penzance. These were taken over by Edwards Coaches on 1 January 2026.
