= Bujanov =

- Municipality
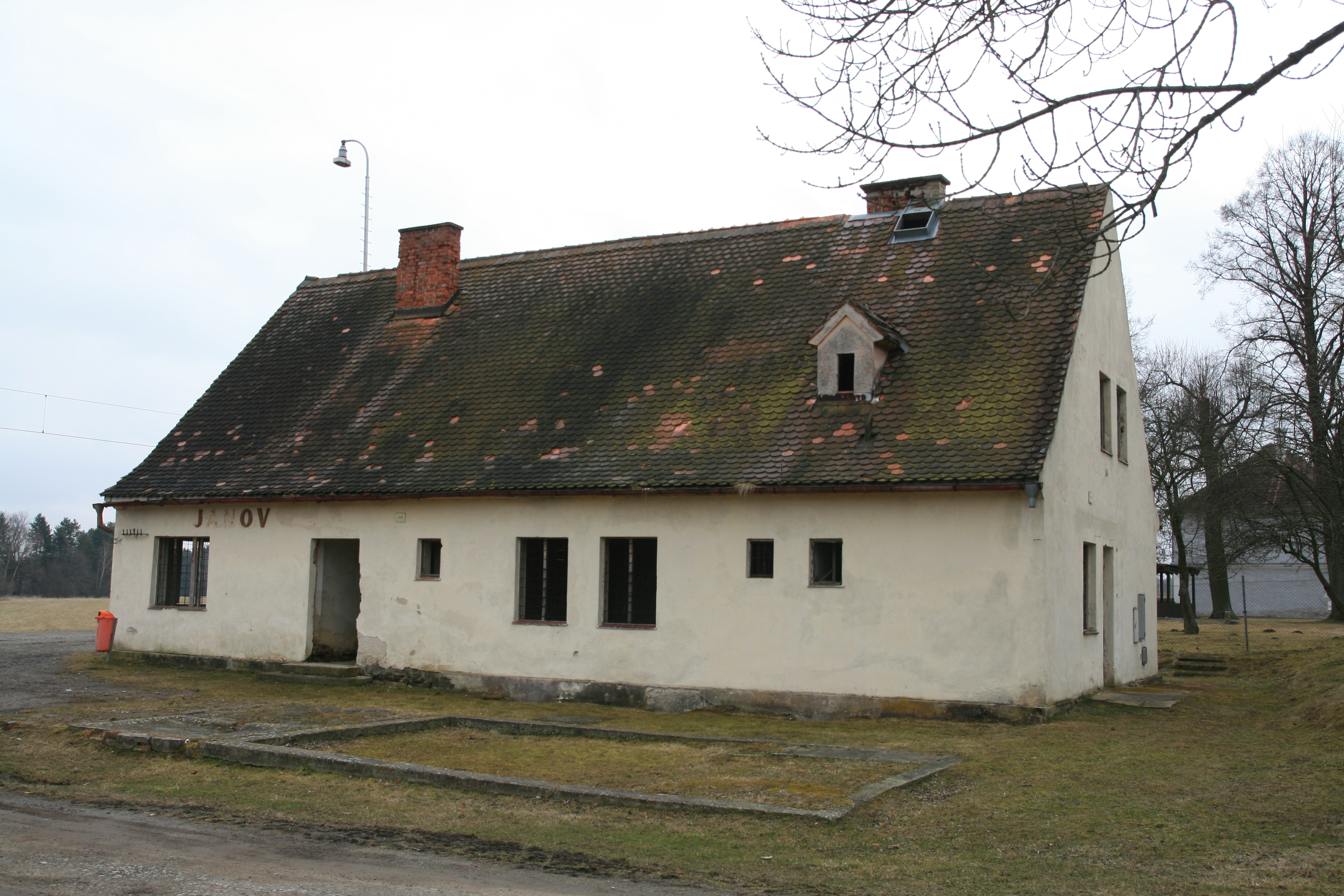
- Historical train station

- Location in the Czech Republic
- Coordinates: 48°42′9″N 14°25′47″E
- Country: Czech Republic
- Region: South Bohemian
- District: Český Krumlov
- First mentioned: 1347

Area
  - Total: 17.43 km^{2} (6.73 sq mi)
- Elevation: 670 m (2,200 ft)

Population (2026-01-01)
  - Total: 623
  - Density: 35.7/km^{2} (92.6/sq mi)
- Time zone: UTC+1 (CET)
  - Summer (DST): UTC+2 (CEST)
- Postal code: 382 41
- Website: www.bujanov.cz

Bujanov (German: Angern) is a municipality and village in Český Krumlov District in the South Bohemian Region of the Czech Republic. It has about 600 inhabitants.

Bujanov lies approximately 16 kilometres (10 mi) south-east of Český Krumlov, 31 km (19 mi) south of České Budějovice, and 154 km (96 mi) south of Prague.

== Administrative division ==
Bujanov consists of four municipal parts (in brackets population according to the 2021 census):

- Bujanov (380)
- Skoronice (86)
- Suchdol (60)
- Zdíky (37)

== History ==
The first written mention of Bujanov is from 1347.

Bujanov was the site of the 2003 Nažidla bus accident, which killed 20 people.

== Demographics ==
Historical population
Year	Pop.	±%
1869	850	—
1880	815	−4.1%
1890	812	−0.4%
1900	860	+5.9%
1910	854	−0.7%
1921	797	−6.7%
1930	810	+1.6%
1950	401	−50.5%
1961	574	+43.1%
1970	643	+12.0%
1980	590	−8.2%
1991	510	−13.6%
2001	577	+13.1%
2011	545	−5.5%
2021	563	+3.3%
Source: Censuses
