= Neoplan Megaliner =

German double deck luxury coach

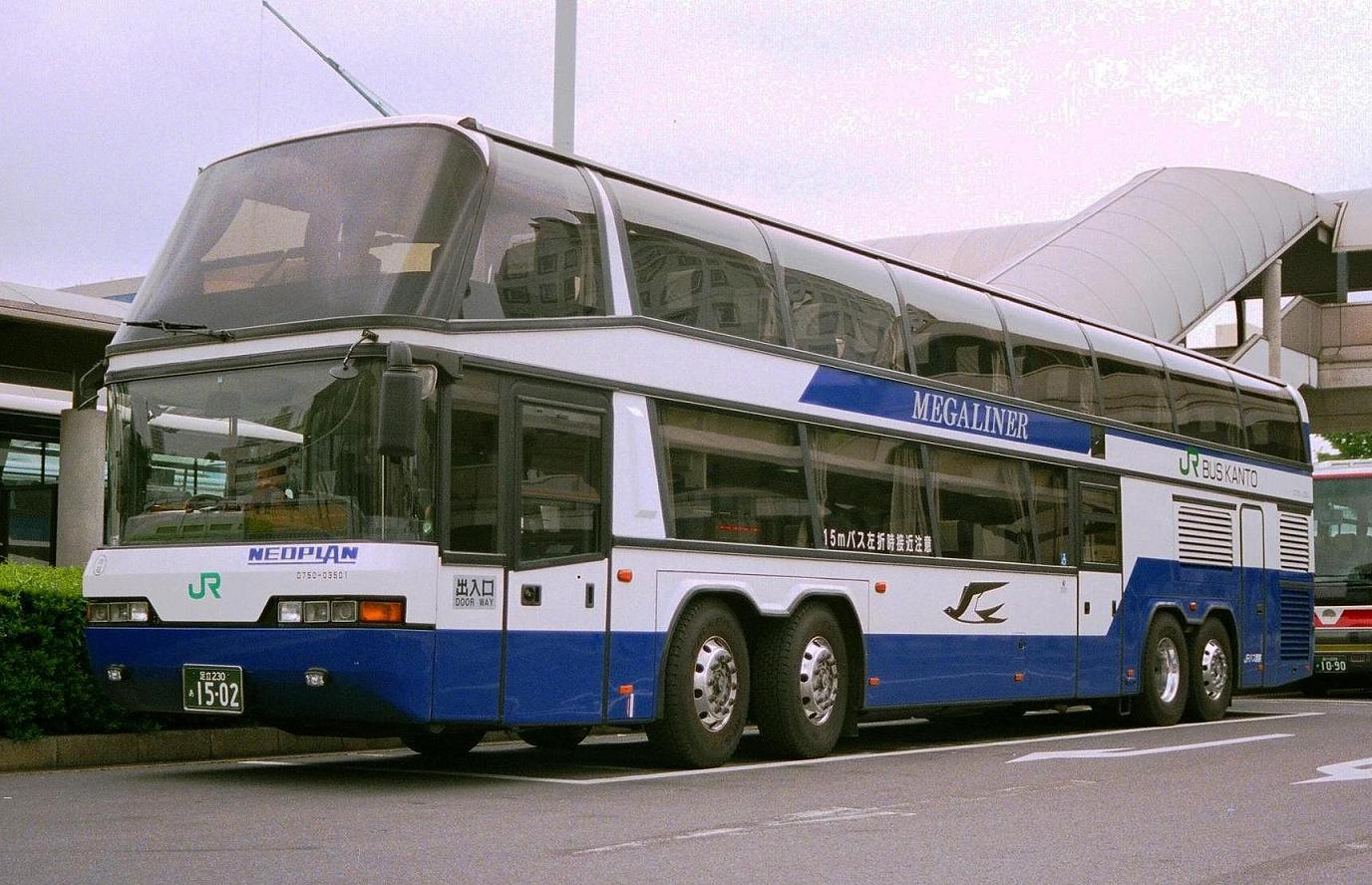
- A right-hand drive Neoplan Megaliner bus operated by JR Bus Kantō in March 2006

Overview
- Manufacturer: Neoplan Bus GmbH
- Production: 1983–2000
- Assembly: Germany

Body and chassis
- Class: Complete bus
- Body style: Quad-axle double-decker luxury coach
- Layout: Longitudinal rear-engine design
- Related: Neoplan Super Skyliner; Neoplan Megashuttle

Powertrain
- Engine: Mercedes-Benz OM442 LA V8
- Transmission: ZF 8S 180 manual

Dimensions
- Length: 15 m (49 ft 3 in)
- Width: 2.5 m (8 ft 2 in)
- Height: 4.00 m (13 ft 1 in); 3.79 m (12 ft 5 in) (Japan)
- Kerb weight: 29,000 kg (63,934 lb) (GVWR)

Chronology
- Predecessor: Neoplan Jumbocruiser; Neoplan Super Skyliner

The Neoplan Megaliner is a quad-axle double-decker luxury coach built by the German coach manufacturer Neoplan Bus GmbH between 1983 and 2000. Primarily intended for the European and Latin American market as the larger counterpart of the Neoplan Skyliner, it was built on lessons learnt from the experimental Neoplan Jumbocruiser. Some Megaliners also saw service mainly as overnight long-distance coaches in Japan.

== Accidents ==
On 28 May 2008, in Japan one of two Neoplan Megaliners operated by West JR Bus Company caught fire while in service, and burnt down completely. No passengers were injured. The company resumed operations with its second Megaliner in July 2008.

On 16 March 2009, in Japan one of two Megaliners operated by JR Kanto Bus Company caught fire on an overnight Seishun Mega-Dream Go service between Osaka and Tokyo. The 77 passengers and driver evacuated safely before the coach was completely destroyed. Following this accident, both operators suspended operations of the remaining two Megaliners in Japan.

== See also ==
- List of buses
