= 2013 Podgorica bus crash =

Road incident in Montenegro

2013 Montenegro bus crash
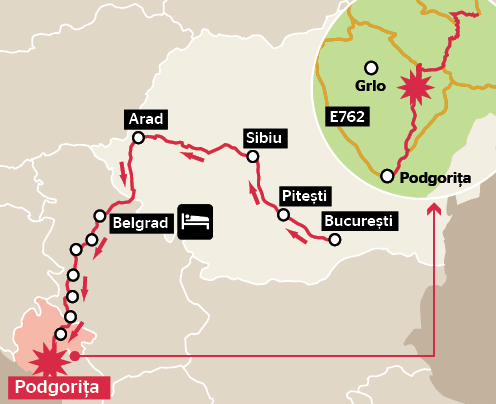
- The route of the bus

Details
- Date: June 23, 2013; ~17:30 local time
- Location: near Morača Monastery, Kolašin Municipality, Montenegro; Coordinates: 42.790199°N 19.3939°E
- Operator: Gregory Tour
- Incident type: Cliff plunge
- Cause: Excessive speed during a rainstorm

Statistics
- Passengers: 47
- Deaths: 19
- Injured: 27 + 1 (pedestrian)

The 2013 Podgorica bus crash was a traffic collision that occurred on 23 June 2013, near Kolašin, Montenegro, 30 km north of Podgorica. The crash took place when a Neoplan Tourliner coach bus departed the roadway during a heavy rainstorm and fell 40 m into a canyon.

The 47 passengers, including two drivers from bus operator Gregory Tour and a guide from the tour organizer Maree Travel, were on a six-day tour from Romania to Montenegro and Croatia. All were Romanian nationals.

The final accident report revealed the bus failed to negotiate a curve at the end of a tunnel due to the driver's excessive speed and slippery road conditions. In total, 18 people were killed and another 30 wounded.

Attempts to rescue the survivors were inhibited by the rocky terrain of the region.

== Reactions ==
Montenegro's Interior Minister Raško Konjević described the crash as "an extremely serious accident". Milo Đukanović, the Prime Minister of Montenegro, also visited the victims at the hospital, and expressed his condolences to the Romanian Ambassador to Montenegro. The Serbian Government also offered medical assistance for the injured.

Victor Ponta, the Prime Minister of Romania, announced a day of national mourning for the date June 26. On the same day Montenegro also observed a day of national mourning in solidarity with Romania.

== See also ==
- List of road accidents (2010–present)
