= Nažidla bus accident =

2003 road incident in the Czech Republic

Details
- Date: 8 March 2003
- Location: Nažidla, Bujanov
- Coordinates: 48°41′11.6″N 14°27′28.8″E
- Country: Czech Republic
- Operator: LSK autobusy s.r.o.
- Incident type: Single-vehicle crash

Statistics
- Passengers: 53
- Deaths: 20
- Injured: 33 (26 severely)
Route map
Accident location in the Czech Republic

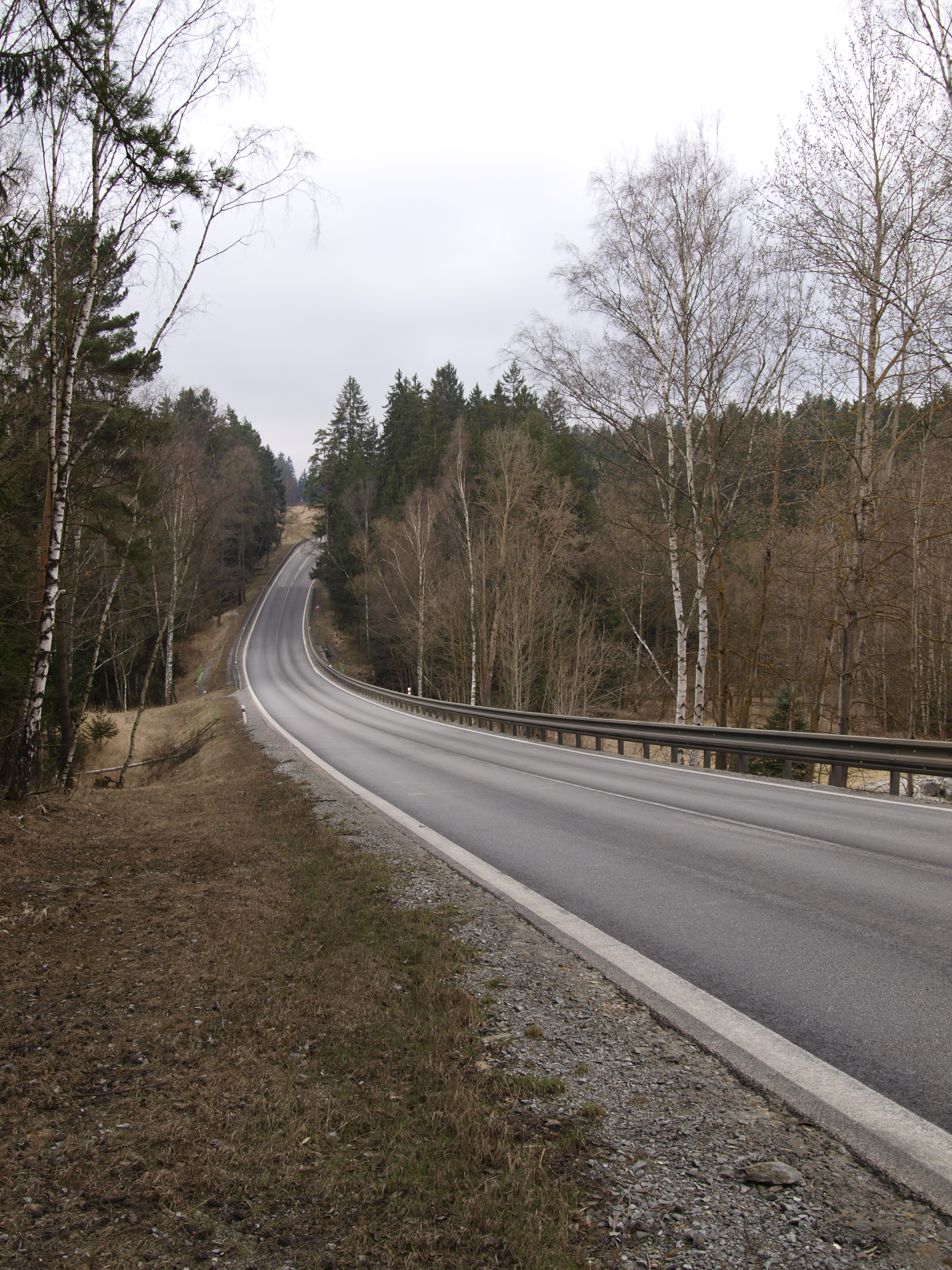
Scene of the accident. The bus was approaching from the opposite hill from the direction of Dolní Dvořiště.

On 8 March 2003, a Neoplan Skyliner double-decker tour bus carrying 53 people veered off the I/3 road (part of European route E55) near the hamlet of Nažidla in Bujanov, Czech Republic, and overturned, rolling seven meters down a slope and killing 19. A twentieth victim died of his injuries two and a half years later. 26 more people were severely injured. The passengers were members and family of the TJ Slovan Karlovy Vary swimming club returning from a skiing trip in the Alps; half of the victims were under 20 years old. In 2018, it was considered the worst transport accident in the Czech Republic since the breakup of Czechoslovakia in 1993.

== Consequences ==
The bus' driver, Pavel Krbec, who survived the crash, was sentenced to eight years in prison for endangerment, but was released after five. Krbec was a taxi driver who had a bus license, but had not gone through the required training to drive professionally and had faked his credentials.
