= Neoplan Jumbocruiser =

German articulated double-decker Bus made by Neoplan

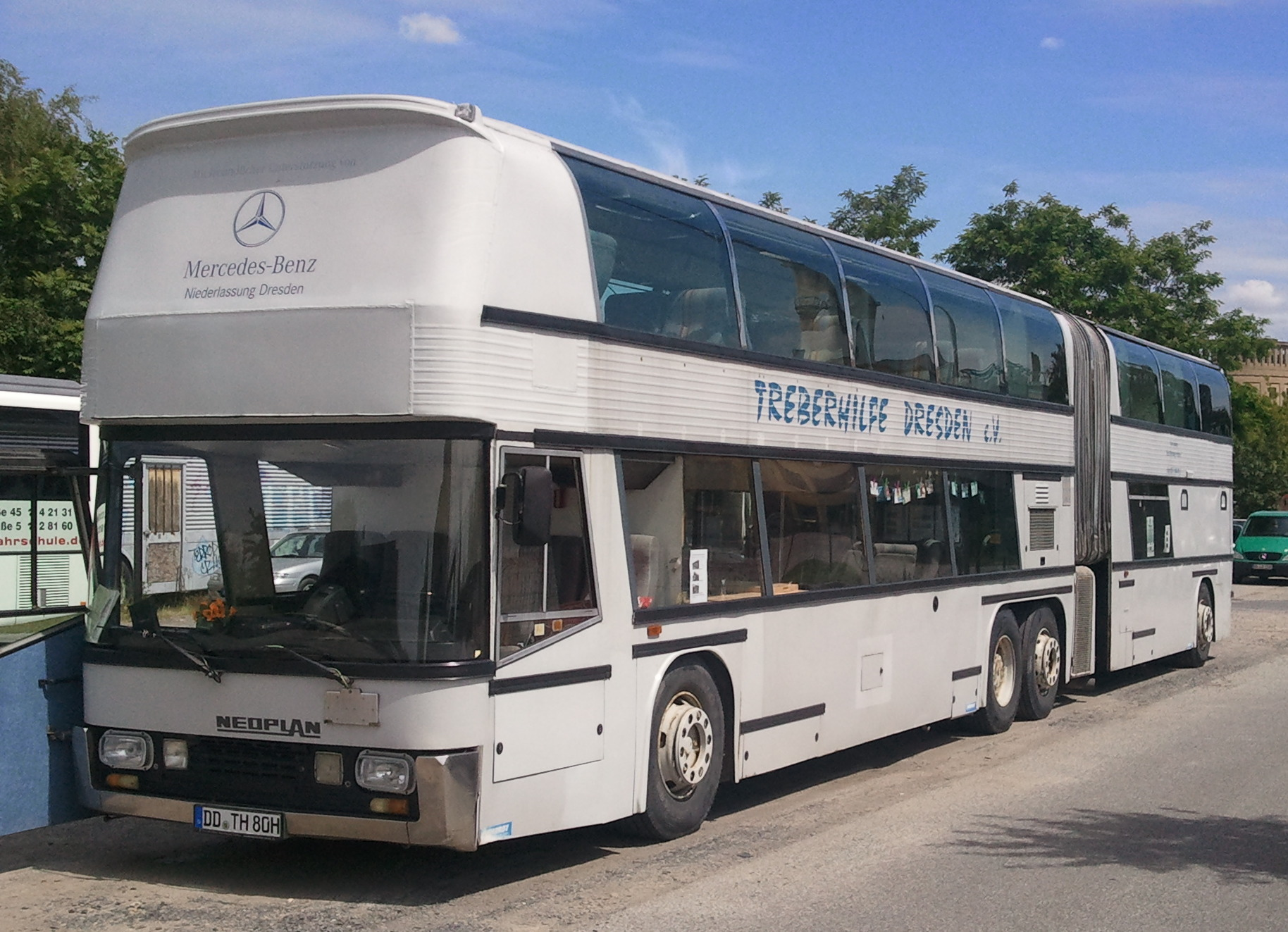
- Neoplan Jumbocruiser N138-4, advertisement supplied by Mercedes-Benz

Overview
- Manufacturer: Neoplan
- Production: 11 produced (1975–1986, 1992)
- Assembly: Germany

Body and chassis
- Class: Commercial vehicle
- Body style: Articulated double-deck multi-axle city coach
- Layout: Rear-engine design

Powertrain
- Engine: Mercedes-Benz Serie 400; OM404: 19.12 liter, 12-cylinder; OM442LA: 14.62 liter, 8-cylinder

Chronology
- Successor: Neoplan Megaliner

The Neoplan Jumbocruiser is an articulated double-deck multi-axle city coach built by Neoplan Bus GmbH between 1975 and 1992. At 18 metres (59 ft) in length, 2.5 m (8 ft 2 in) wide and 4 m (13 ft) in height, it has a capacity for 170 passengers.

== History ==
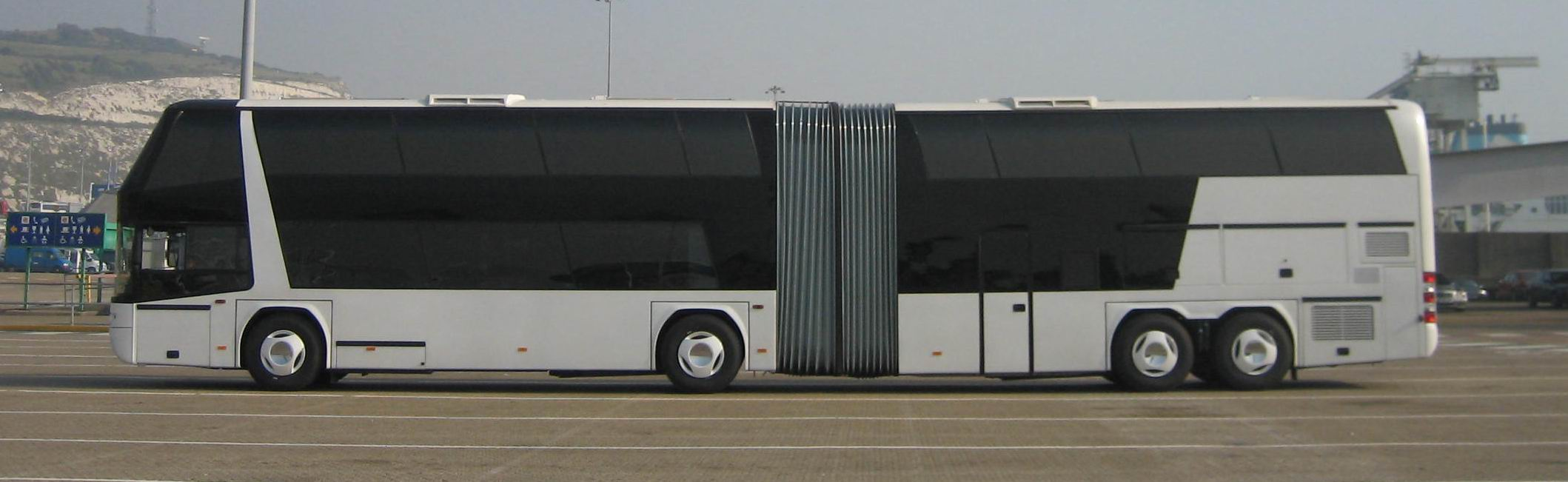
The last model of the Neoplan Jumbocruiser had a different axle formula due to its rear-mounted engine.

The Jumbocruiser was first manufactured in 1975 but never went into full-scale production.

One Jumbocruiser, with 'extremely comfortable seating' for 80 passengers, operated a route from Belgium to Spain on high-intensity service and traveled some 160,000 km (99,000 mi) from new. This vehicle was involved in a rollover accident, initially claimed as a design fault, but the parties concerned eventually agreed that it was due to driver error while handling a cup of coffee.

This model was then rebuilt by Jumbocruiser Ltd (no connection) of Bristol in England. They used the services of Richard Cœur de Lyon (now called the Caross Center) near Mons in Belgium to completely strip the coach and rebuild it to a more modern design, and with modified suspension. The engine, gearbox, braking system, wiring looms, and the dashboard were replaced and upgraded. A new dashboard with semi-digital wrap-around unit was installed in place of the original rust-prone flat unit. Modern front and end caps were fitted, and were eventually reduced after they were found to be too wide. The vehicle was tested by Vehicle and Operator Services Agency in the UK in November 2006 and by 2007 Jumbocruiser Ltd. began to market the bus as a "rock 'n' roll" star sleeper bus, but had sold it by February 2010.

== See also ==
- List of buses
- AutoTram Extra Grand
