= Bus transport in Szczecin =

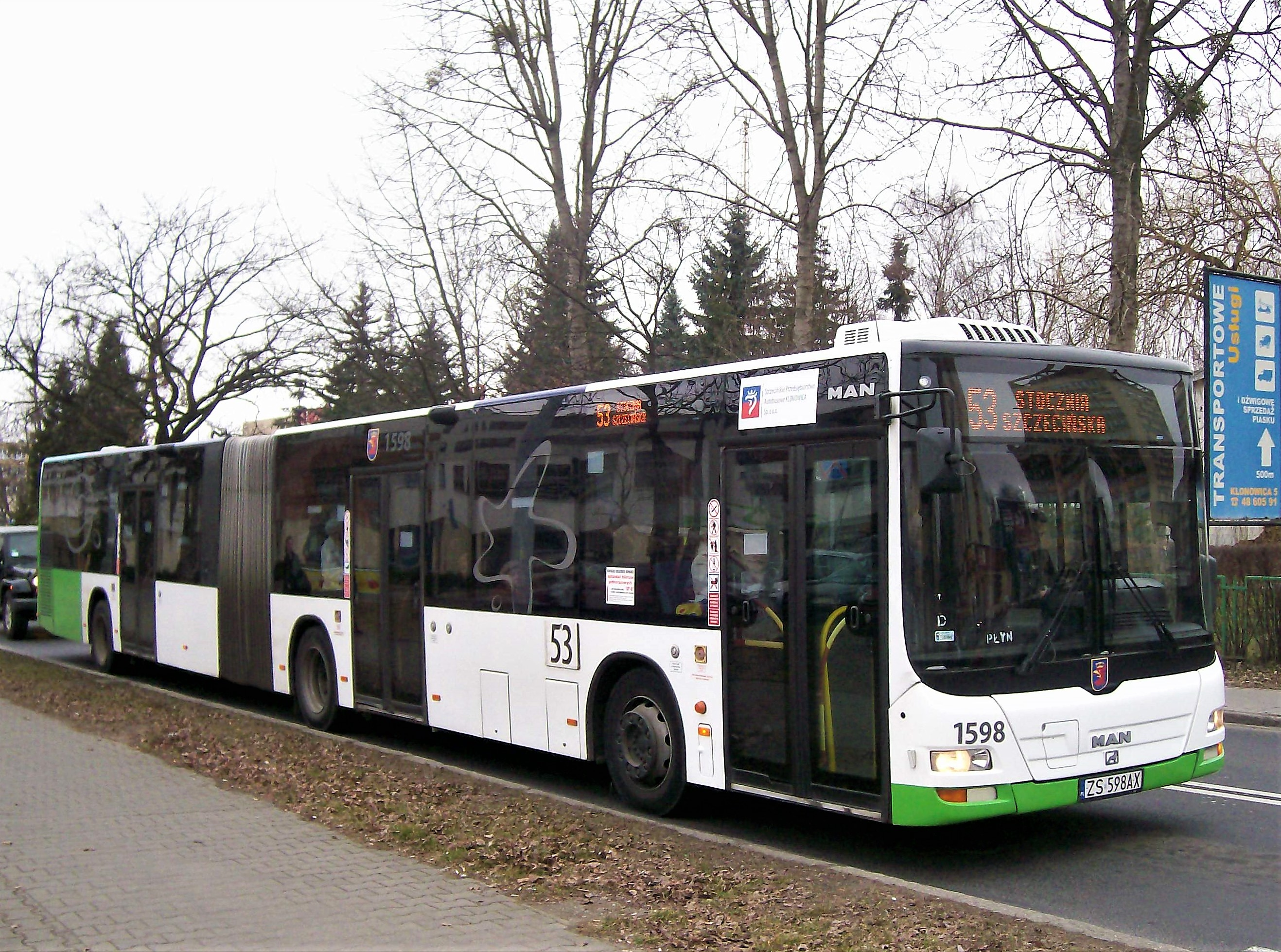
- MAN NG 313, line 53 in Szczecin

Overview
- Locale: Szczecin, Poland
- Transit type: Public bus transport
- Number of lines: 73: 54 normal lines; 5 fast lines; 14 night lines

Operation
- Began operation: 1928
- Operators: SPA Dąbie; SPA Klonowica; SPPK; PKS Szczecin

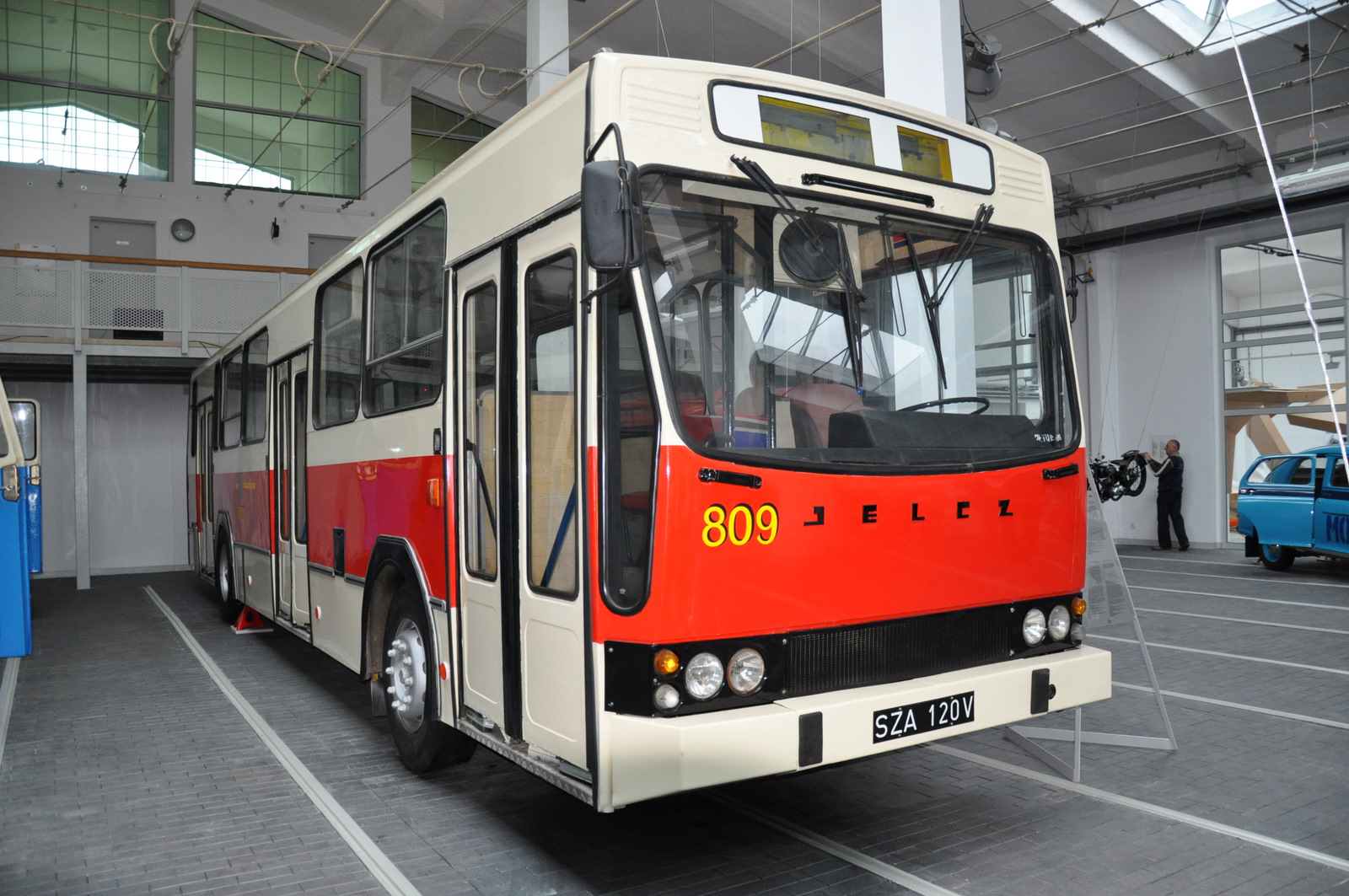
Jelcz PR110M in technology museum

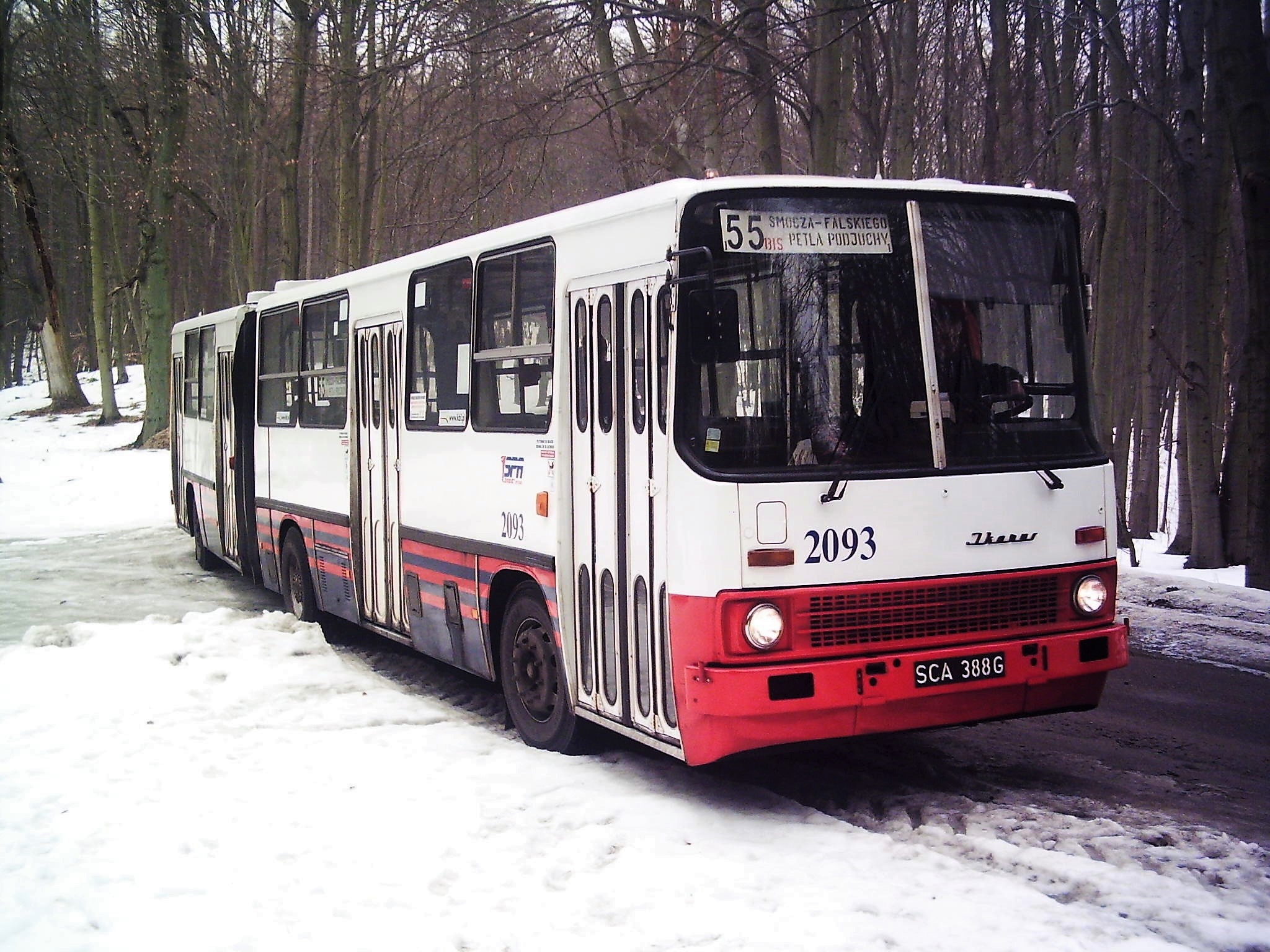
Ikarus 280 in Szczecin

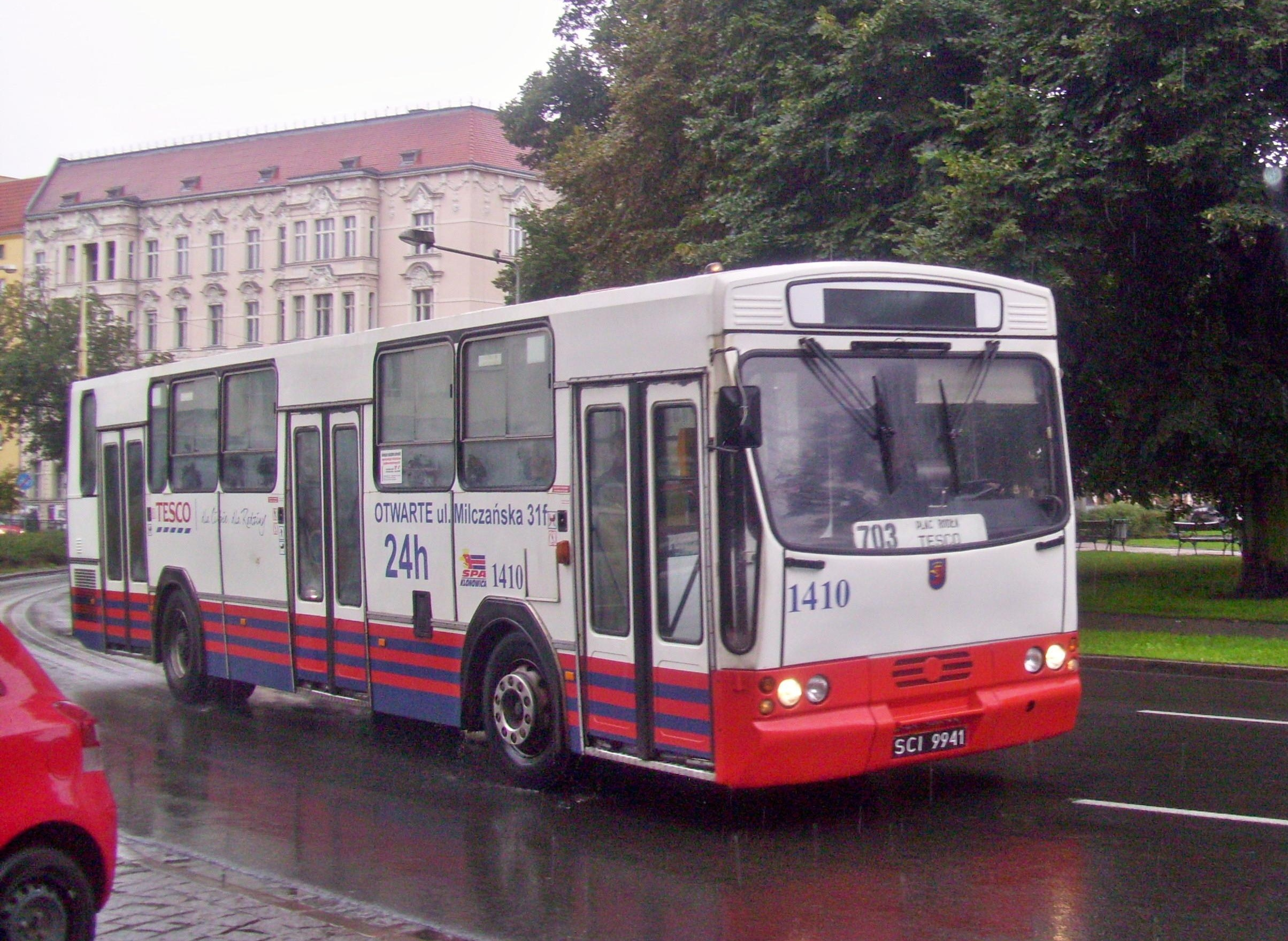
Jelcz 120M in Grunwaldzki square

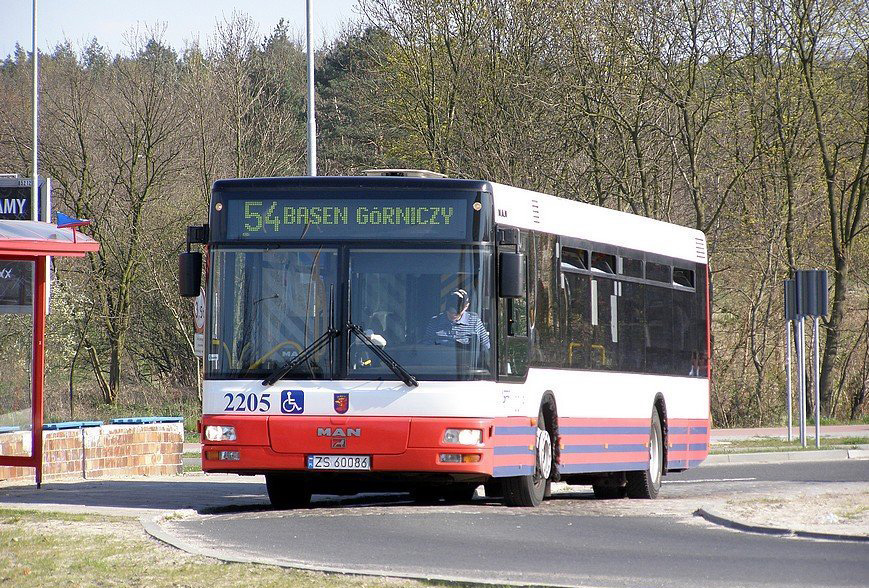
MAN NL 223 belonging to SPA Dąbie

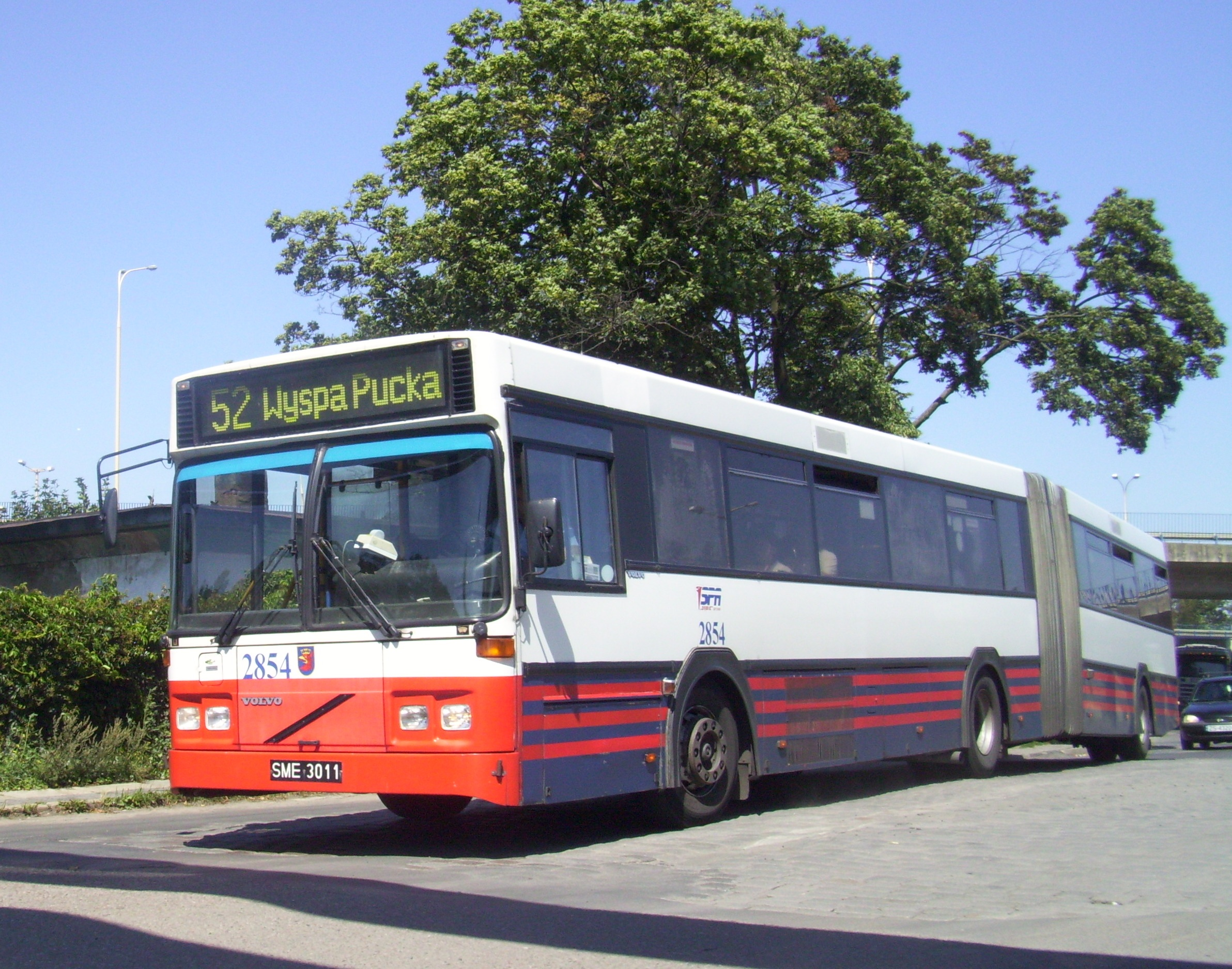
Volvo B10M in Szczecin

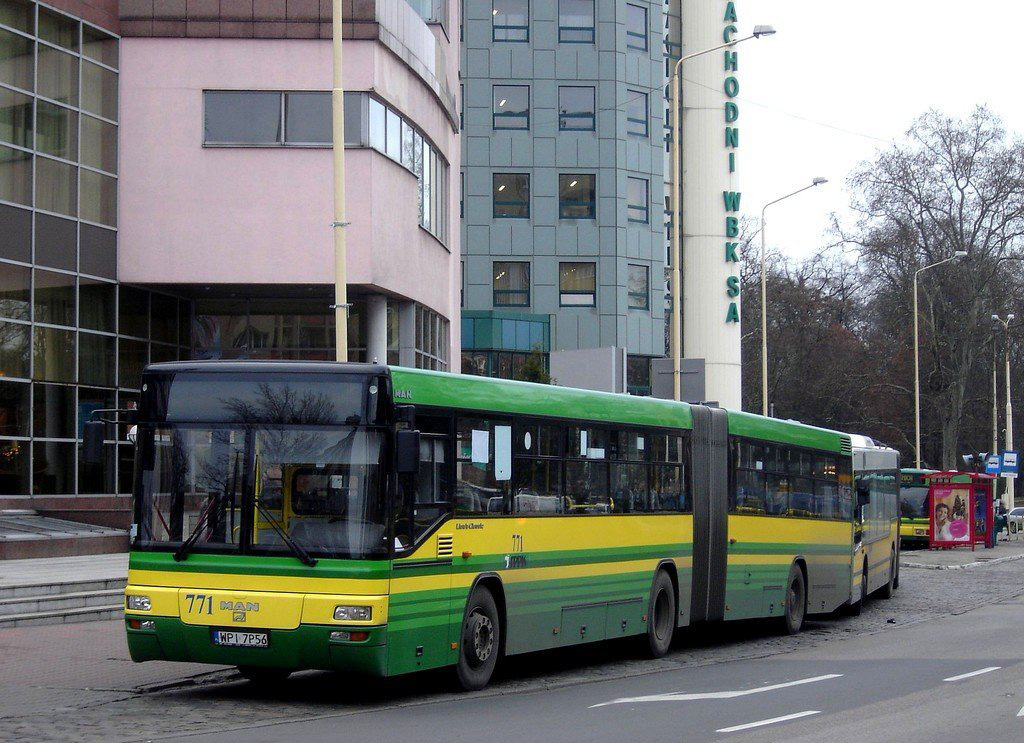
MAN SG 313 Lion's Classic G on Rodła Square in Szczecin

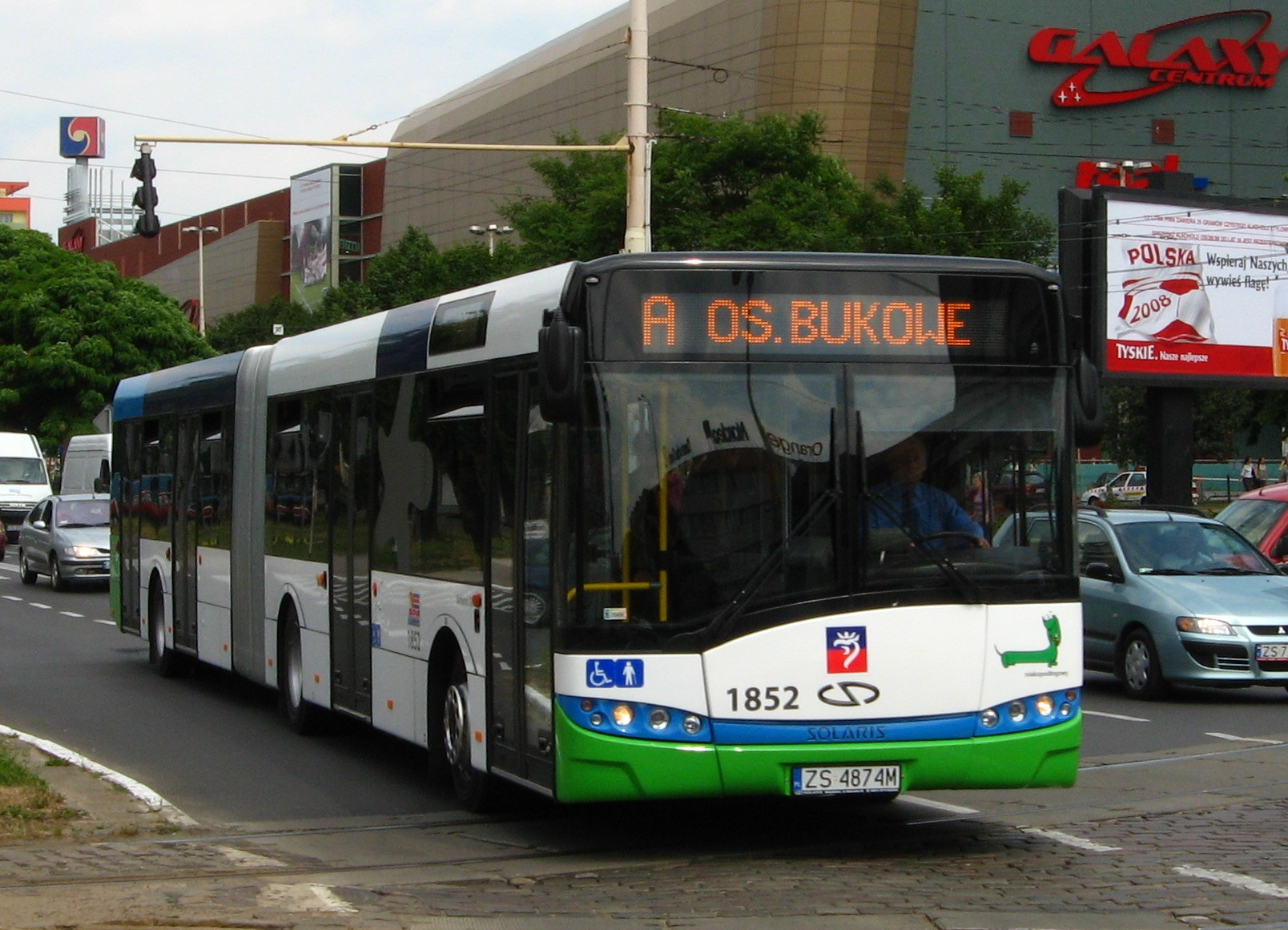
Solaris Urbino 18 belonging to SPA Klonowica

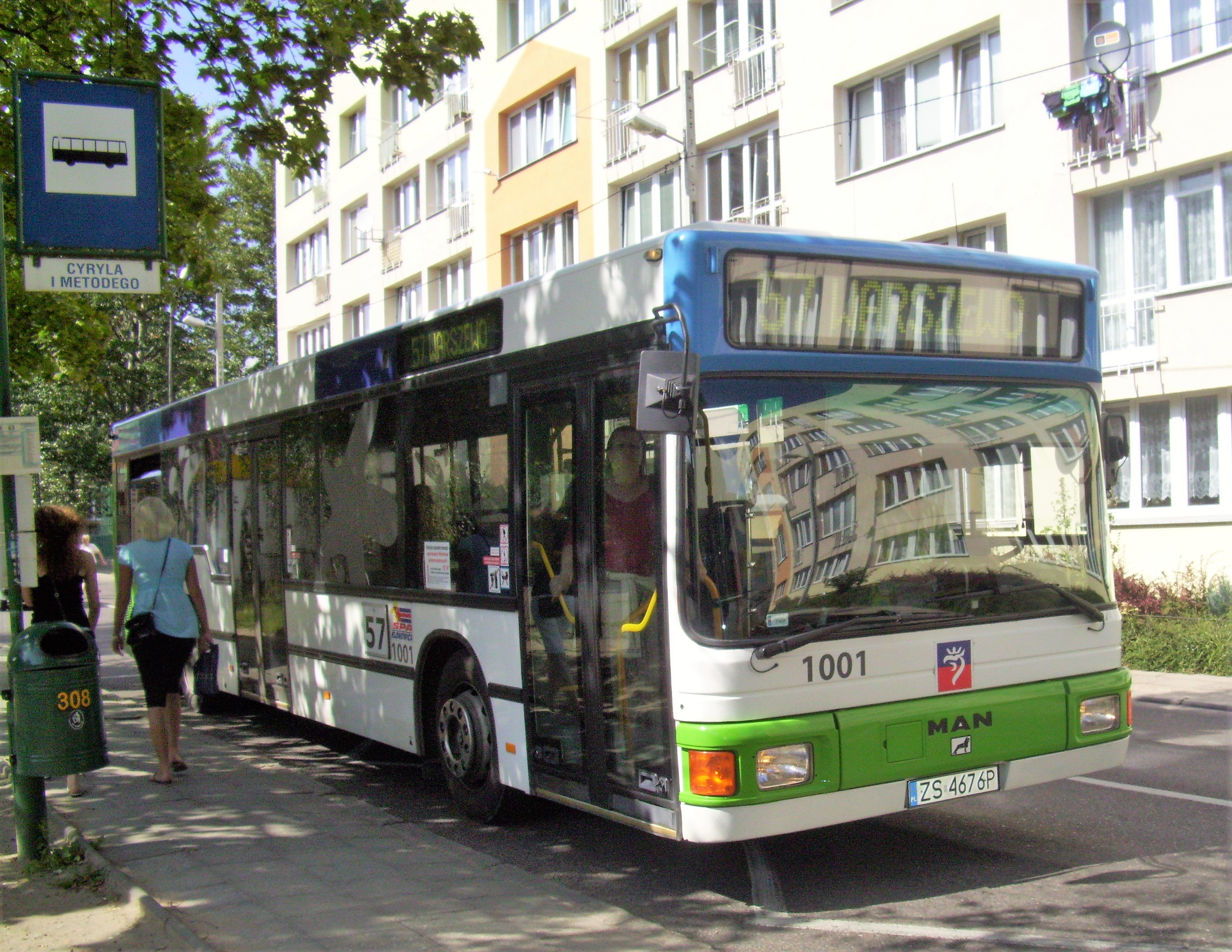
Bus MAN in FG2050 colors

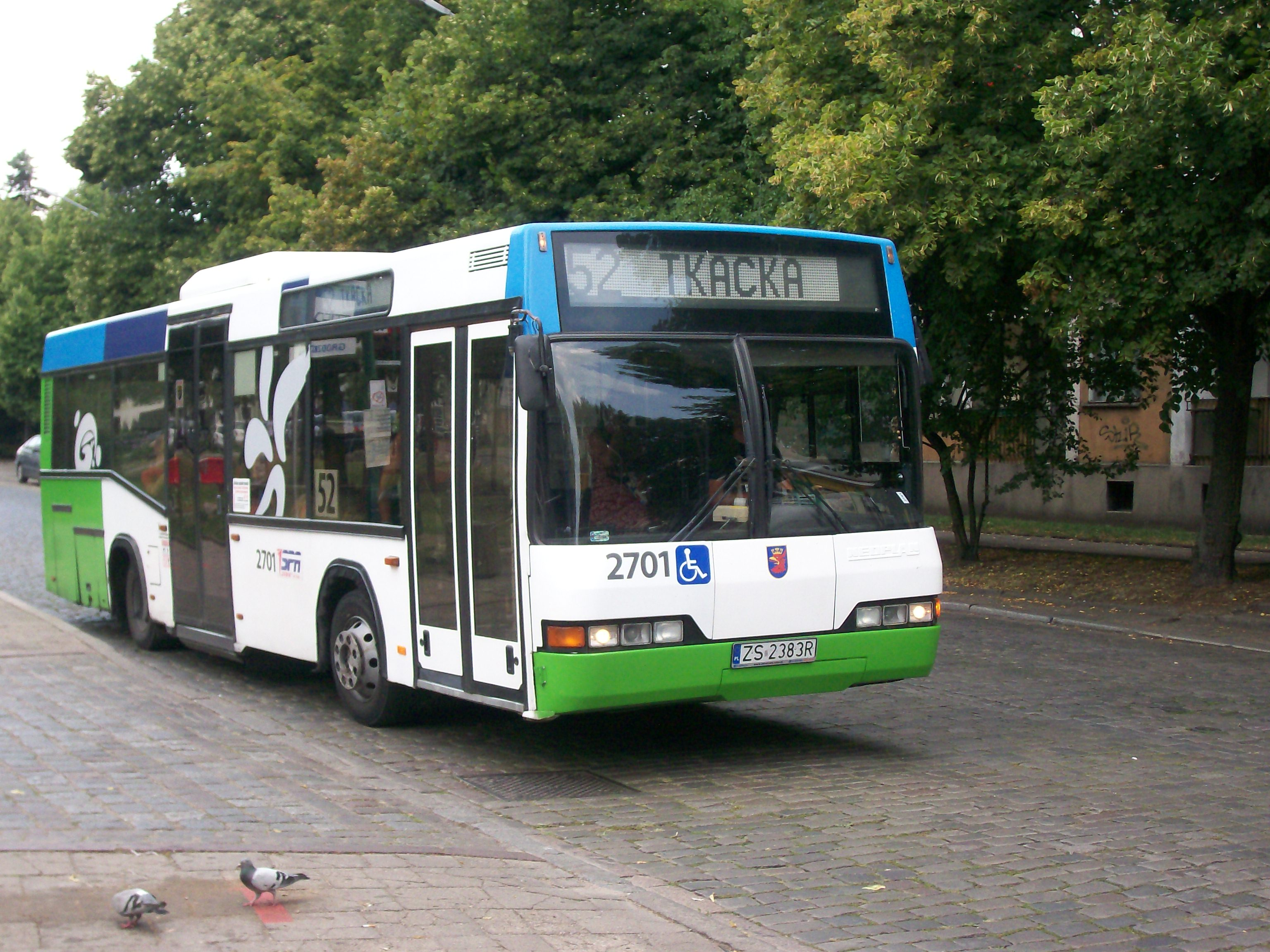
Neoplan N4011 on route 52

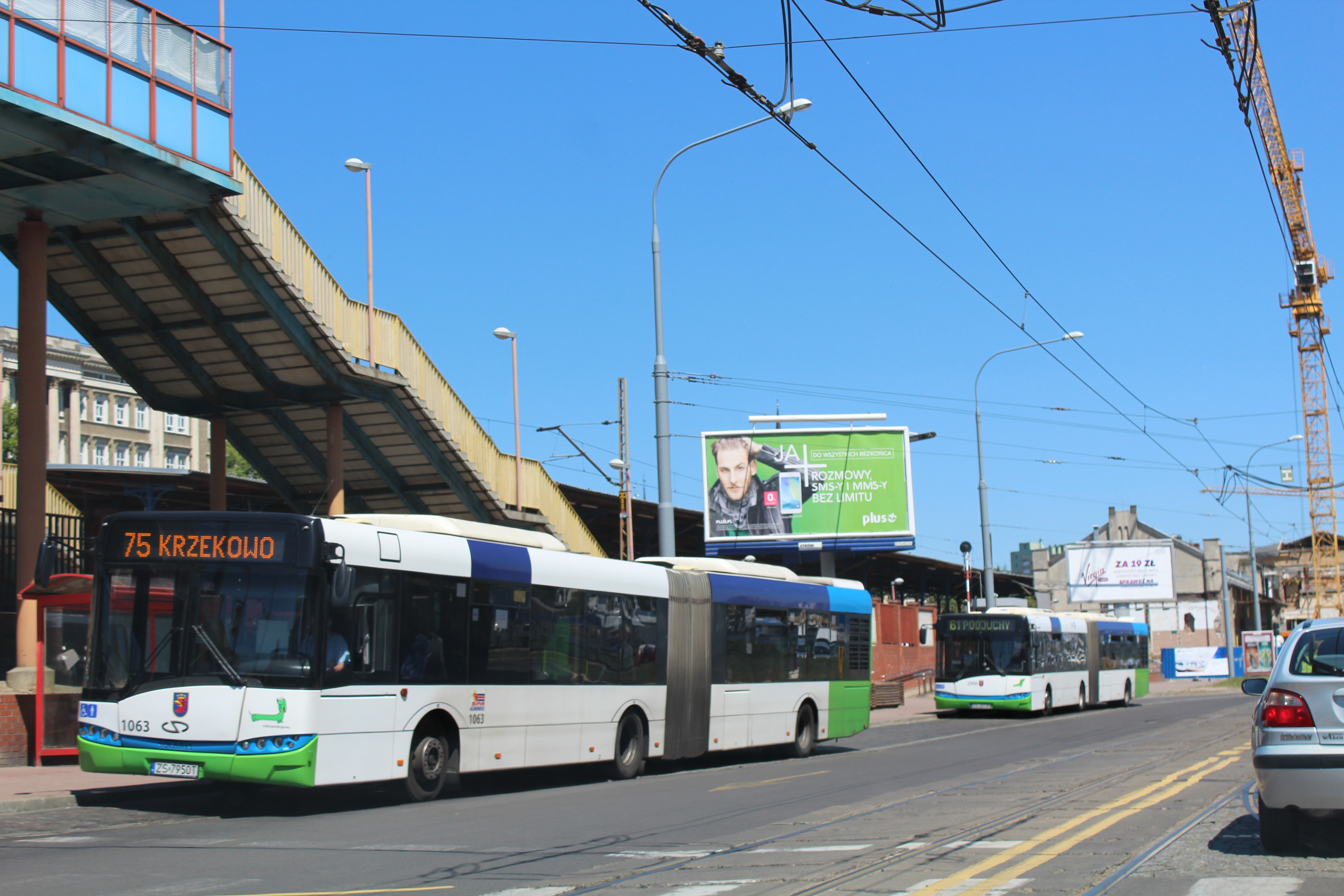
Buses Solaris Urbino 18 near Szczecin Główny

Bus transport in Szczecin – part of public transport, which connects city districts and city Szczecin with Police, Dobra, Kołbaskowo, Police, Kobylanka and Goleniów. Szczecin buses are operated by four companies on behalf of the ZDiTM (Zarząd Dróg i Transportu Miejskiego; Road and Public Transport Administration). The bus system has been in operation since 1928. Nowadays, in Szczecin and the surrounding area 73 bus lines are running, including 54 normal lines, 5 fast lines and 14 night lines.

== Operators ==
- Szczecińskie Przedsiębiorstwo Autobusowe "Dąbie" – 10 Andrzeja Struga Street, Szczecin
- Szczecińskie Przedsiębiorstwo Autobusowe "Klonowica" – 5 Sebastiana Klonowica Street, Szczecin
- Szczecińsko-Polickie Przedsiębiorstwo Komunikacyjne – 21 Fabryczna Street, Police
- PKS Szczecin – 4 Leona Heyki Street, Szczecin

== History ==
=== Buses in pre-war city ===
For almost 50 years, public transport in Szczecin consisted only of a tram system. It changed in 1928, when the Stettiner Straßen-Eisenbahn Gesellschaft company, which already operated trams, launched the first suburban bus line, leading from Lotnisko (balloon loop) to Dąbie. First line was marked "A" (as Altdamm, German name of Dąbie). Bus lines have supported tram lines there, where construction of tram tracks was unprofitable. In 1936, the first city bus line opened, marked "S".

Routes in 1938:

- suburban
  - A Flughafen (Lotnisko) – Altdamm (Dąbie)
  - F Chausseehaus (Tor Kolarski) – Falkenwalde (Tanowo), through Polchow (Pilchowo)
  - H Flughafen (Lotnisko) – Hökendorf (Klęskowo), through Finkenwalde (Zdroje)
  - N Berliner Tor (Brama Portowa) – Neuenkirchen (Dołuje) (from 1929 to 1933 worked as U to Ueckermünde), through (Mierzyn)
  - P Gotzlow (Gocław) – Pölitz (Police)
  - Pd Flughafen (Lotnisko) – Podejuch (Podjuchy), through Finkenwalde (Zdroje)
  - R Flughafen (Lotnisko) – Rosengarten (Kijewo), through Altdamm (Dąbie)
- urban
  - S Adolf-Hitler Schule, Brunner Str. (Witkiewicza) – Friedeborn Str. (Kołłątaja), through Poniatowskiego, Traugutta, Wyspiańskiego and Skargi Street.
  - SW Scheune (Gumieńce) – Wendorf (Słowieńsko), through: Wierzbowa, Wrocławska and Okulickiego Street.

In 1930, total length of routes was 101 km, including the longest bus line in history of Szczecin (61,5 km)—from Brama Portowa to Ueckermünde. In 1935, after reduction of the line and opening of new lines, total length of lines was 46,5 km and in 1939, 64 km. Bus stock in 1929 consisted of nine vehicles, in 1937 there were 21 buses.

During World War II, only two bus lines were running: to Tanowo and to Dołuje, probably there was also a line to Police. Bus lines were running instead of trams in streets destroyed by bombing in 1943 and in 1944. Bus transport in German Szczecin had stopped before 1944.

=== Buses in post-war city ===
After World War II, only two buses ran in Szczecin. Others had been damaged or were used for evacuation. The first post-war bus line was launched on 4 August 1947 (the route had been operated by pre-war bus Bussing) and ran from Kościuszki Square to Gumieńce. Public transport had been managed by Tramwaje i autobusy miasta Szczecina. In 1948 five lines were running, which led to Dąbie, Police, Żydowce, Stołczyn and Gumieńce, operated by buses: Büssing, GMC, Leyland (since 1948). In the 50s, a number of bus lines were running: Mavag, Star, San, Chausson, Škoda-Karosa, Renault, Nysa, Jelcz-Berliet and Jelcz 272. In 1955, marking of lines was changed from alphabetical to numerical. In the middle 60s, the first bus depot was built in Klonowica Street. Earlier buses had been stored in the tram depot in Kolomuba Street. Number of bus lines increased: in 1960 there were 10 lines, in 1964 were 16 lines (including one shortened: "bis"), in 1968 were 22 lines (including 3 bis-lines and one to Wyspa Pucka). In 1976, Miejski Zakład Komunikacyjny was transformed into Wojewódzkie Przedsiębiorstwo Komunikacji Miejskiej (WPKM), which also managed public transport in other cities of the voivodship. In 1978, construction of "Dąbie", the second bus depot in Szczecin was completed. Seven years later another bus depot opened—in Police. On 12 November 1981, the first Ikarus 280 buses began operation. By 1990 almost 300 buses had been bought. Since 1985, night bus lines began supporting night tram lines. In the same year, the first Jelcz M11 buses appeared on routes.

List of bus lines in 1988 (night lines in 1985):

- 51: Kołłątaja Pętla – Osiedle Arkonia
- 52: Police Szkoła – Wyspa Pucka
- 53: Gocław-Osiedle Bukowe
- 54: Żydowce-Osiedle Arkonskie
- 55: Zdunowo – Basen Górniczy
- 56: Osiedle Kasztanowe – Heyki
- 57: Kołłątaja – Warszewo
- 58: Stocznia Warskiego – Gocław
- 59: Golęcino – Elektrownia Pomorzany
- 60: Stocznia Warskiego – Autostrada Poznańska
- 61: Dworzec Główny PKP – Klucz
- 62: Basen Górniczy – Wielgowo
- 63: Kołłątaja – Skolwin
- 64: Kniewska – Klucz-Autostrada
- 65: Studzienna – Osiedle Słoneczne
- 66: Osiedle Słoneczne – Klucz
- 67: Ludowa – Karola Miarki
- 68: Stocznia Warskiego – Pomorzany-Dobrzyńska
- 69: Basen Górniczy – Zakłady Mięsne
- 70: Zakłady Mleczarskie – Jezierzyce
- 71: Osiedle Arkońskie – Osiedle Słoneczne
- 72: Basen Górniczy – Śmierdnica
- 73: Basen Górniczy – Zdunowo Dworzec
- 74: Basen Górniczy – Osiedle Bukowe
- 75: Krzekowo – Dworzec Główny PKP
- 76: Osiedle Kaliny – Nabrzeże "Ewa"
- 77: Osiedle Słoneczne – Osiedle Kasztanowe
- 79: Basen Górniczy – Jezierzyce
- 101: Jasienica – Plac Rodła
- 102: Gocław – Police Szkoła
- 103: Głębokie – Zakłady Chemiczne
- 104: Podjuchy – Elektrownia Dolna Odra
- 105: Dobra Szczecińska – Łukasińskiego Ogrody
- 106: Jasienica – Police Rynek
- 107: Osiedle Chemik – Plac Rodła
- 108: Mierzyn – Przecław
- 109: Police Szkoła – Police Rynek
- 110: Gryfino (Piastów) – Elektrownia Dolna Odra
- 111: Zajezdnia Police – Police Rynek
- 201: Zajezdnia Klonowica – Osiedle Słoneczne
- 202: Gocław – Police (ul. Grzybowa)
- 204: Osiedle Chemik – Zajezdnia Dąbie.

== Lines ==
=== Normal lines ===
Normal bus routes are the largest part of bus transport and consist of 54 lines, numbered from 51 to 124.

=== Fast lines ===
Bus transport in Szczecin has also five fast lines, marked A, B, C, G and H.

=== Night lines ===
There are 14 night bus lines. Since 1996, night bus lines have been running instead of night tram lines.
