= Szczecińsko–Polickie Przedsiębiorstwo Komunikacyjne =

Transport company in Poland

Szczecińsko-Polickie Przedsiębiorstwo Komunikacyjne
- Genre: Private limited company
- Founded: 1 February 1997
- Headquarters: Police, Poland
- Area served: Szczecin and gmina Police
- Key people: Kazimierz Trzciński
- Services: Public transport
- Website: spak.pl

Szczecińsko–Polickie Przedsiębiorstwo Komunikacyjne (SPPK) is a bus transport company in Szczecin and gmina Police, Poland. The headquarters is located in Police, at 21 Fabryczna Street.

It has been operating as a separate company since 1 February 1997, when the company was separated from MZK Szczecin. Initially, shares in the company were divided in half between city Szczecin and gmina Police. Nowadays, 66% of shares are owned by city Police.

The company, on behalf of the Zarząd Dróg i Transportu Miejskiego, currently operates following bus lines: 63 (together with SPAK), 101, 102, 103, 106, 107, 109, 110, 111, fast line F and night lines 524 and 526. Moreover, the company deals with serving a bus line (regardless of the ZDiTM) between Police and Trzebież (Linia Samorządowa) and a bus line for allotments' owners (Linia Działkowa). There is also a bus line aimed at workers of the Police chemical plant (Polish: Zakłady Chemiczne Police).

The current chairman is Kazimierz Trzciński.

== Vehicles ==
Image	Name	Number of buses	Production year	Details
	Ikarus 280	1	1990	Since 2007 used as a staff vehicle
	MAN NL 222	4	1998, 1999	A bus produced in 1998 was bought in 1998 from MAN Nutzfahrzeuge Saltzgitter
	MAN NL 262	1	1998	These buses were bought from TRD Reisen Dortmund in 2010
	MAN NL 223	6	2000	
	MAN NL 263	3	1998, 2000	One bus was bought from Liestal, another two buses came from Balingen
	MAN NL 283	2	2004	
	MAN NL 283 Lion's City	3	2005, 2012, 2013	A bus produced in 2005 was bought from ForBus (nowadays Mobilis sp. z o.o.).
	MAN NL 313	2	1999	
	MAN NL 313-15	5	2000	
	MAN NG 262	4	2006	This series of buses was bought from AS Sporveisbussene Oslo
	MAN NG 313	6	2001, 2003, 2004	
	MAN NG 323 Lion's City	4	2012	
	MAN Lion's Classic G (SG 313)	4	2005	The only transport company in Poland to operate these buses
	Solaris Urbino 12	8	2011	Low-floor buses painted in SPPK colors
	Solaris Urbino 18	5	2011	Low-floor buses painted in Szczecin Floating Garden colors

== Sources ==
- Official website of the company
