= Szczecińskie Przedsiębiorstwo Autobusowe "Klonowica" =

- Genre: Private limited company
- Founded: 1 November 1999
- Headquarters: Szczecin, Poland
- Area served: Szczecin
- Key people: Krzysztof Putiatycki
- Services: Public transport
- Number of employees: 302
- Website: spak.pl

Szczecińskie Przedsiębiorstwo Autobusowe "Klonowica" (SPAK or SPA Klonowica) – one of four municipal bus transport companies in Szczecin, Poland. The company is owned by city Szczecin. The headquarters is located at the left bank of Odra river, in Zachód District (10 Sebastiana Klonowica Street).

It has been operating as a separate company since 1 November 1999. That day, according to the resolution of Szczecin city council, the company was separated from MZK Szczecin (just like Szczecińskie Przedsiębiorstwo Autobusowe "Dąbie"). On behalf of the Zarząd Dróg i Transportu Miejskiego, the company currently operates the following bus lines: 51, 53, 57, 58, 59, 60, 63, 67, 68, 69, 70, 74, 75, 76, 78, 80, 82, 83, 86, 87, 88 (daytime lines), B (fast line), and night lines 521, 525, 527, 528, 529.

The current chairman is Krzysztof Putiatycki.

== Vehicles ==
Image	Name	Production year	Number of buses
	MAN NL 262	1994–2000	2
	MAN NL283-10,5 Lion's City	2005	1
	MAN NL 223	2002	7
	MAN NL 263	2002, 2003	1
	MAN NL 283	2004	2
	Solaris Urbino 10	2010–2012	4
	Solaris Urbino 12	2009–2015	22
	Solaris Urbino 18	2008–2012	34
	Volvo B10M	1994–1995	15
	MAN NG 313 Lion's City	2005–2006	11
	MAN NG 363	2002	1
Total			105
Low-floor buses			83.5%

== Sources ==
- Official website of the company
