= Neoplan N4016 =

German Urban Bus made by Neoplan

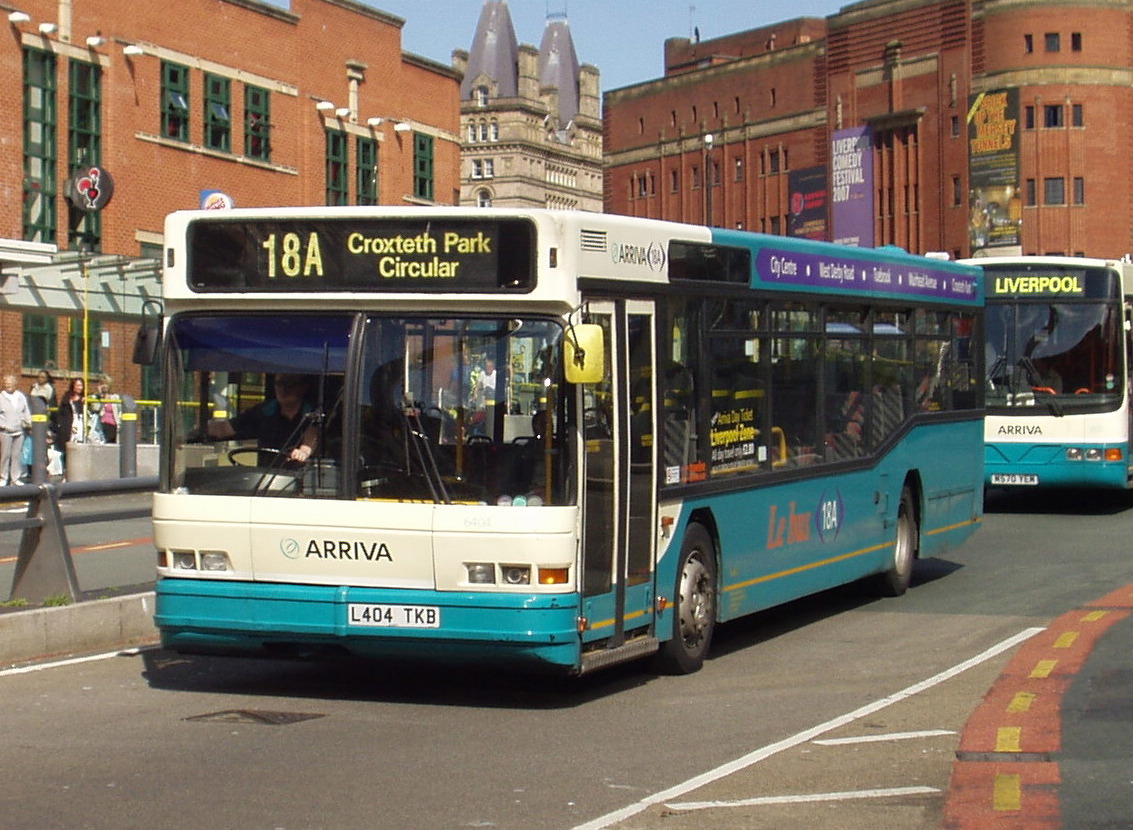
- Arriva North West & Wales Neoplan N4016 in Liverpool

Overview
- Manufacturer: Neoplan; MAZ
- Also called: MAZ-101
- Production: 1988-99
- Assembly: Pilsting, Bavaria; Bolechowo, Poland; Minsk, Belarus

Body and chassis
- Doors: 1 (UK); 1-3 (Europe)
- Floor type: Low entry
- Chassis: Integral
- Related: Neoplan N4009

Powertrain
- Engine: MAN or DAF
- Capacity: 31–39 (seated)
- Transmission: Voith or ZF Friedrichshafen

Dimensions
- Length: 12 m (39 ft)
- Width: 2.5 m (8.2 ft)

Chronology
- Successor: Neoplan Centroliner (for Neoplan); MAZ-103 (for MAZ); Solaris Urbino 12 (for Solaris Bus & Coach, may only in Poland.)

The Neoplan N4016 was a low-floor single-decker bus built by Neoplan between 1988 and 1999, initially at Stuttgart in Germany and later also in Poland. It is the larger version of the Neoplan N4009 midibus.

In Belarus, Minsk Automobile Plant (MAZ) took contacts with Neoplan in order to produce the MAZ-101, a low-floor bus closely related to the Neoplan N4016. While the MAZ-101 sold poorly, subsequent variants (MAZ-103, MAZ-105 and the three-axle MAZ-107) have been sold to a vast amount of Belarusian, Russian and foreign operators and are still in production today.

== Specifications ==
The N4016 is a 12-meter long and 2.5-meter wide bus, commonly powered by either a MAN or DAF engine, and equipped with a Voith or ZF Friedrichshafen transmission. This model of bus is known for its spacious seating, typically accommodating 31 to 39 passengers, along with a large standing capacity. Notable features of the N4016 include a double-curvature windscreen, a separately mounted destination sign, and a uniquely rounded roof dome. The design of the roof dome distinguishes it from the existing Centroliner model, featuring a more pronounced curvature.

== Service ==
=== United Kingdom ===
The N4016 is remembered for being the first low-entry single-decker bus sold in the United Kingdom. Twelve were sold in the United Kingdom, all delivered to Merseybus for use on Merseytravel's SMART bus network in Liverpool.

=== Europe ===
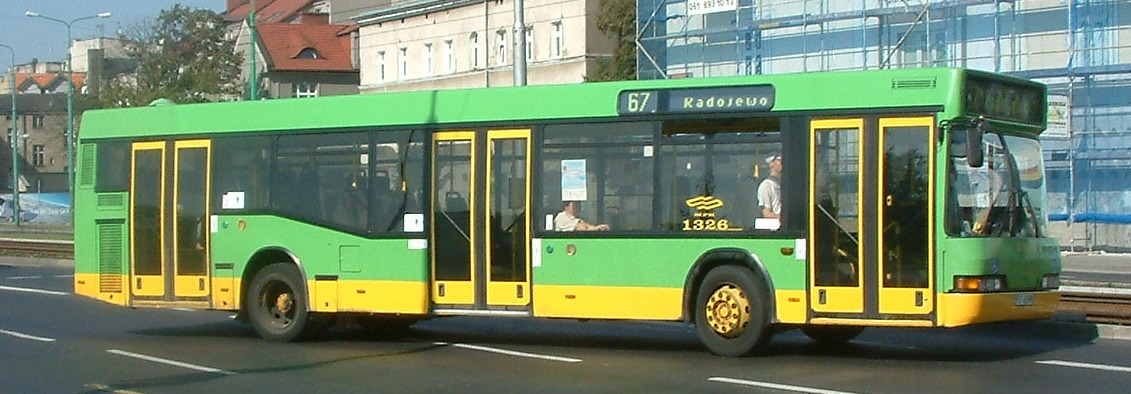
Neoplan N4016 in Poznań in September 2006

Athens-based bus operator, OAS, purchased 93 Neoplan N4016s in 1994. All of them were retired in 2009 and have since been abandoned in a vacant lot in Ano Liosia.

Poznań-based tram and bus operator, Miejskie Przedsiębiorstwo Komunikacyjne w Poznaniu, purchased 32 Neoplan N4016s between 1996 and 1999. The last Neoplan N4016s were withdrawn in 2014.
