= Szczecińskie Przedsiębiorstwo Autobusowe "Dąbie" =

- Genre: Private limited company
- Founded: 1 November 1999
- Headquarters: Szczecin, Poland
- Area served: Szczecin
- Key people: Włodzimierz Sołtysiak
- Services: Public transport
- Total equity: 61,300,000 zł
- Website: https://www.spad.szczecin.pl

Szczecińskie Przedsiębiorstwo Autobusowe "Dąbie" (SPAD or SPA Dąbie) is one of four municipal bus transport companies in Szczecin, Poland. The headquarters is located at the right bank of Szczecin, at 10 Andrzeja Struga Street. The company is owned by the city of Szczecin.

It has been operating as a separate company since 1 November 1999. That day, according to the resolution of Szczecin city council, the company was separated from MZK Szczecin. On behalf of the Zarząd Dróg i Transportu Miejskiego, the company currently operates following bus lines: 54, 56, 61, 62, 64, 65, 66, 73, 77, 79, 84 (daytime lines), A, B, and C (fast lines), and night lines 533, 534.

The current chairman is Włodzimierz Sołtysiak.

== Vehicles ==
Image	Name	Production	Description	Number of buses
	Solaris Urbino 12	2007; 2008; 2010; 2011; 2013; 2017; 2018	In 2023, a used Solaris from 2013 was purchased. These buses were produced by Solaris Bus&Coach.	30
	Solaris Urbino 18	2009; 2010; 2012; 2014; 2017; 2018	These buses were bought in 2009 (8), 2010 (18), 2012 (7), 2014 (1), 2017 (2), 2018 (10). In 2023, a used Solaris from 2014 was purchased.	51
	Solaris Urbino 18,75	2012	That bus was bought in 2013 and numbered 2200. Currently, it's the longest bus operated in Poland.	1
	Mercedes Benz O530G	2004, 2006; 2008; 2009; 2010; 2011	In 2016, 6 pieces were purchased from Hagen, 2016 - 1 from Oberhausen, Between 2020 and 2022, 10 pieces were purchased from Krefeld. In 2023 - 2 pieces from Wilhelmshaven, and 2025 - 6 pieces from Munich.	23
	Mercedes Benz O530	2008	In 2021, 2 Mercedes from Viersen debuted.	2
Total				107
Low-floor buses				100%

== See also ==
- Tramwaje Szczecińskie, trams
