= Neoplan N4009 =

German Low-Floor midibus made by Neoplan

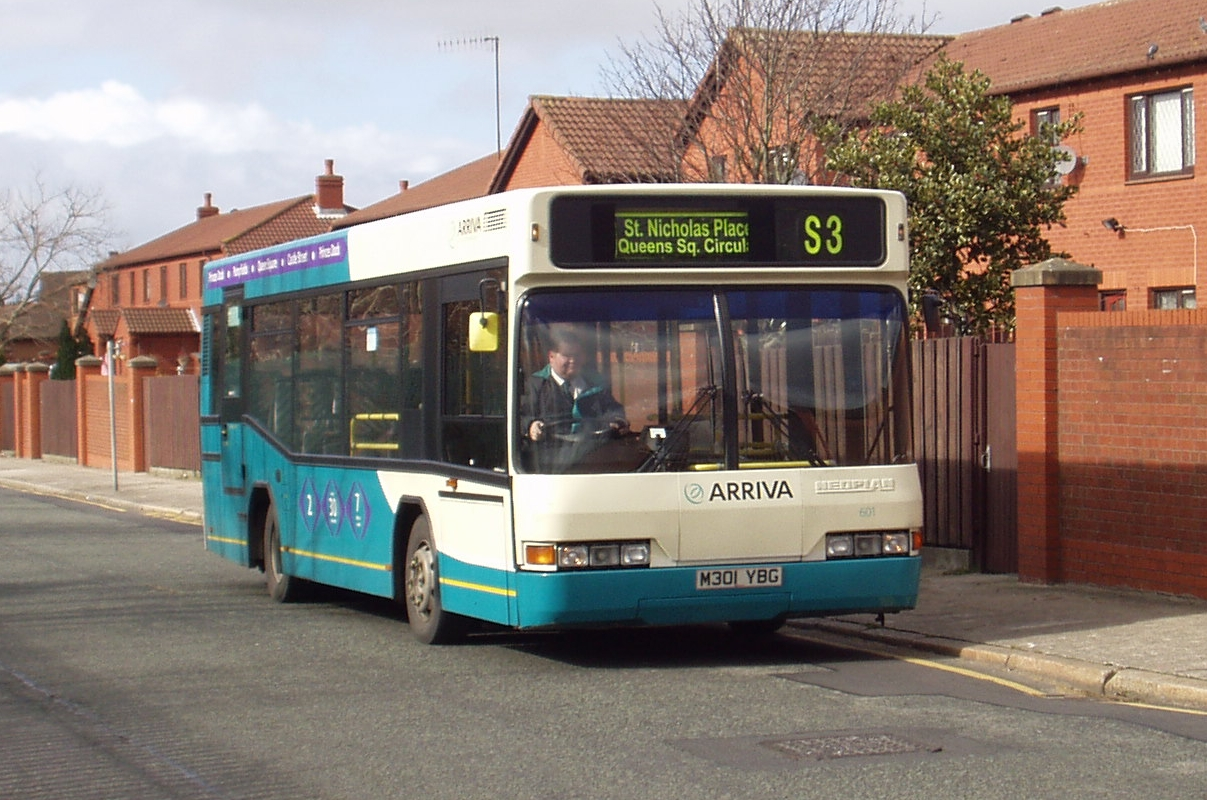
- Arriva North West & Wales Neoplan N4009 in May 2005

Overview
- Manufacturer: Neoplan
- Production: 1988-99
- Assembly: Stuttgart, Germany

Body and chassis
- Doors: 1
- Floor type: Low floor
- Chassis: Integral
- Related: Neoplan N4016

Powertrain
- Engine: MAN or DAF
- Capacity: 23 to 31 (seated)
- Transmission: Voith or ZF

Dimensions
- Length: 9 m (30 ft)
- Width: 2.5 m (8.2 ft)

The Neoplan N4009 is a low-floor midibus that was produced by Neoplan between 1988 and 1999, initially at Stuttgart in Germany and later also in Poland. It is the smaller version of the Neoplan N4016 full-size bus.

== Specifications ==
It has a rounded roof dome similar to the N4016 and a double-curvature windscreen with a separately mounted destination sign. It is 9 m (30 ft) long and 2.5 m (8 ft 2 in) wide, and is powered by a horizontal MAN or DAF engine with Voith or ZF Friedrichshafen transmission. It typically seated 23 with a large standing capacity.

=== United Kingdom ===
Only three buses were sold in the United Kingdom. These were bought by MTL, Liverpool in 1995, and passed to MTL's successor Arriva North West & Wales in 2000. They were in service until 2008, when they were sold on to Heartlands Bus in the Midlands.

In mid to late 2010, the three right hand drive N4009s were scrapped and retired.

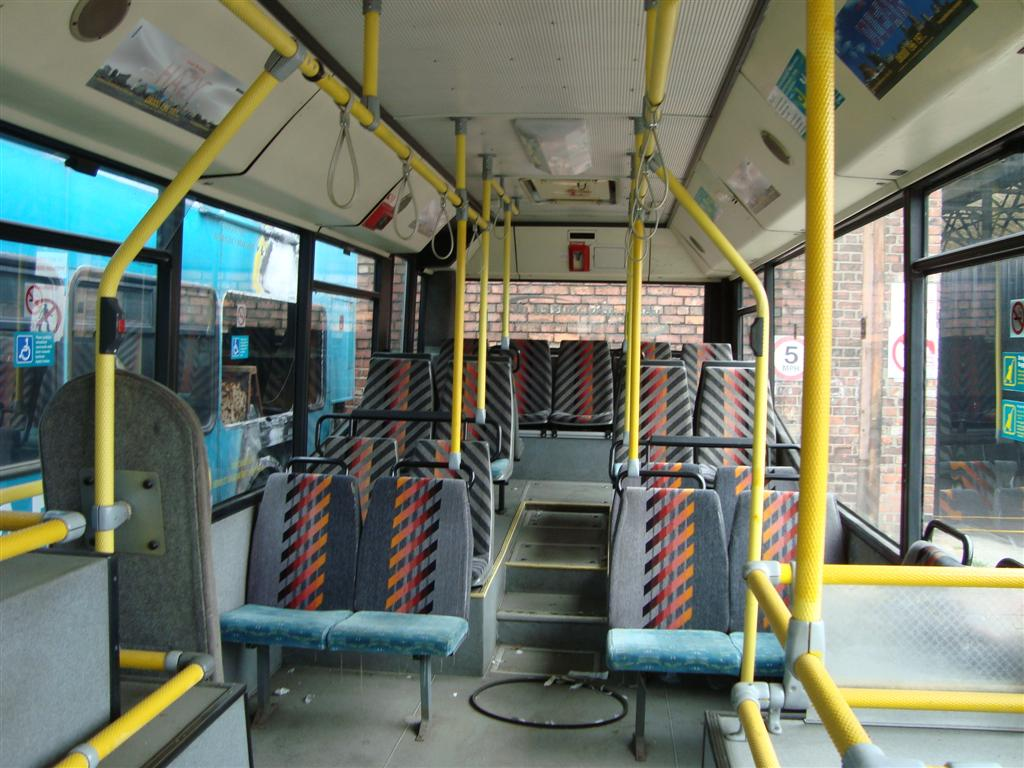
Interior view
