= Solaris Urbino 18 =

Polish Articulated bus

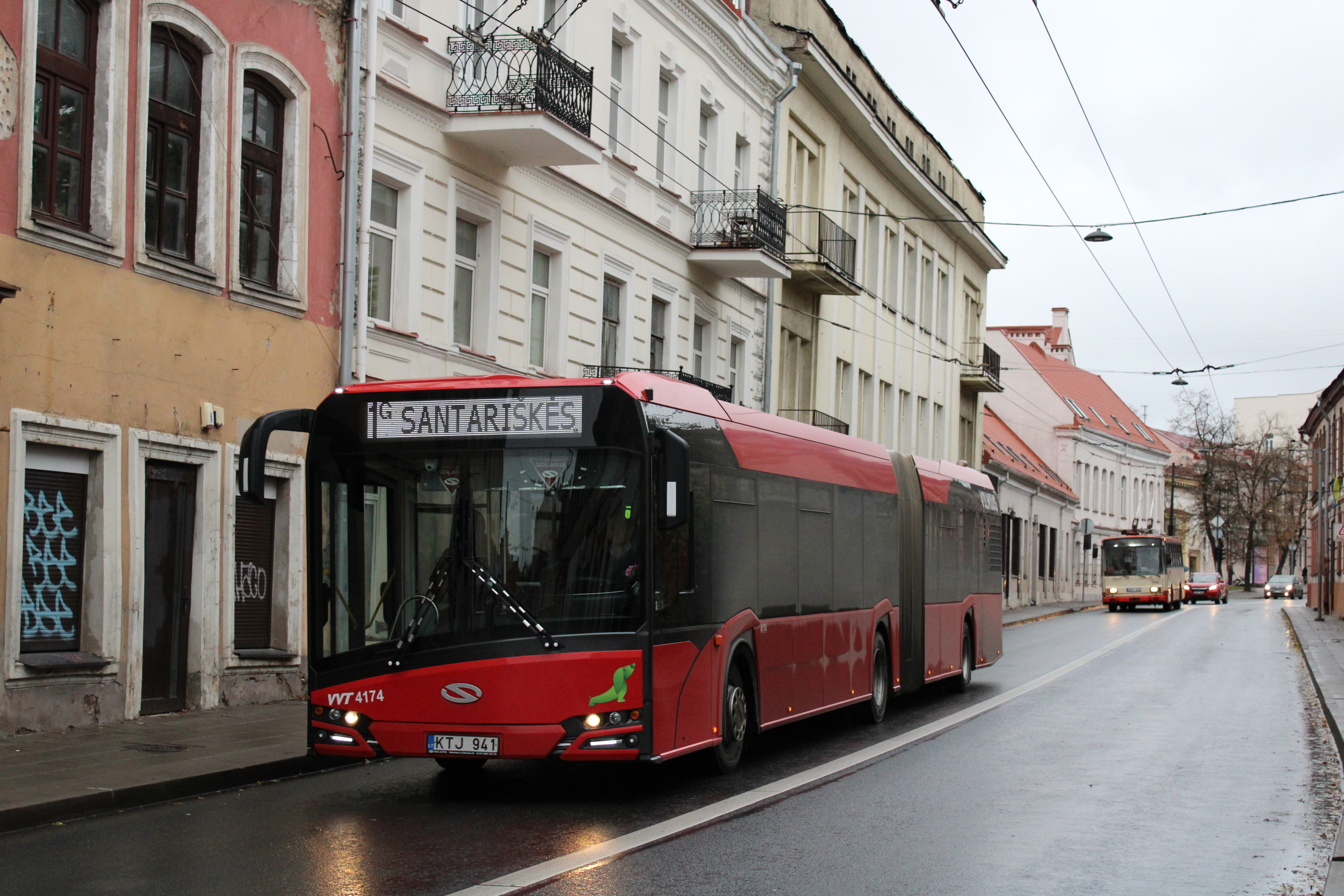

Overview
- Manufacturer: Solaris Bus & Coach
- Production: 1999 - present
- Assembly: Bolechowo, Poland

Body and chassis
- Class: Single-deck city bus
- Doors: 3 - 4 doors
- Floor type: Low floor

Powertrain
- Engine: 1) Cummins ISBe5 250B; 2) MAN D2866 LOH25; 3) MAN D2866 LOH27; 4) DAF MX11-240
- Capacity: 145; 154(Solaris Urbino 18.75)
- Power output: 1) 178 kW (242 HP); 2) 228 kW (310 HP)
- Transmission: 1) Voith DIWA D864.3E; 2) Voith DIWA D864.5; 3) ZF Ecomat 5HP590; 4) ZF EcoLife 6AP1400

Dimensions
- Length: 17.9 m (58 ft 9 in); 18 m (59 ft 1 in); 18.75 m (61 ft 6 in)
- Width: 2.55 m (8 ft 4 in)
- Height: 2.85 m (9 ft 4 in); 3.035 m (9 ft 11.5 in)
- Curb weight: 28,000 kg (62,000 lb)

Chronology
- Predecessor: Neoplan N4021

Solaris Urbino 18 is a low-floor articulated version of the Solaris Urbino series buses designed for public transport, produced by the Polish company Solaris Bus & Coach from Bolechowo near Poznań in Poland. It is the second most popular (after the Solaris Urbino 12) Solaris model in terms of the number of units sold. Since 2005, the third generation of the Urbino 18 is produced. In addition to the basic model, which is powered by a diesel engine which meets the Euro V emission standard, there are versions produced to meet the EEV and fueled with CNG or the second generation hybrid bus model.

== History ==
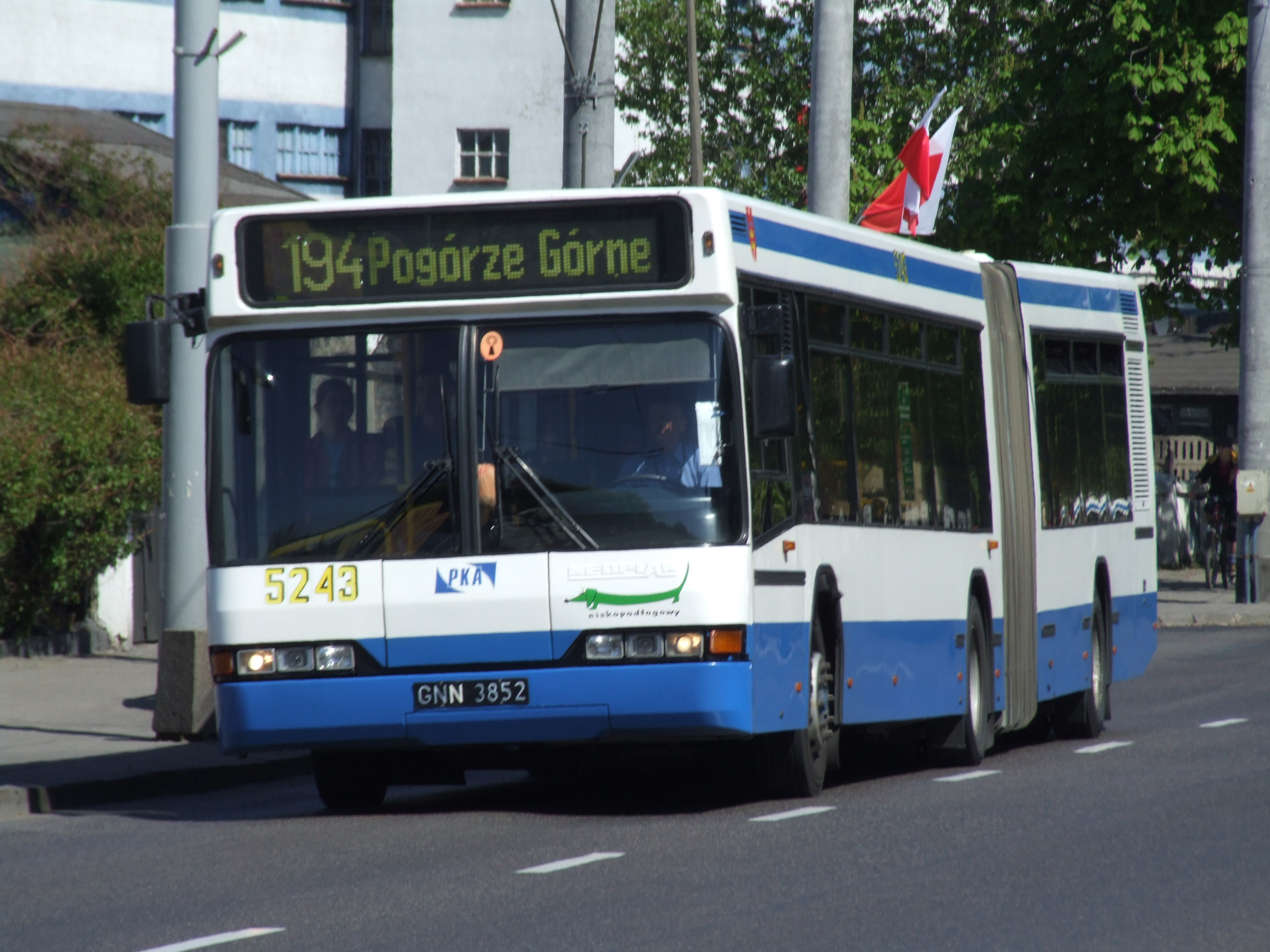
Neoplan N4021

On August 4 1994, Neoplan Polska company was established in Poland. September 5 of the same year, the first low-floor buses Neoplan N4020 (15 meter long) were ordered by Warsaw. October 5 1995, the day after signing the contract for the supply of buses to Poznań, it was decided to build a factory in Bolechowo near Poznań.

Between 1996 and 2000 Neoplan Polska built the Neoplan N4000-series buses. In 1999, Neoplan Polska started to independently produce buses under the brand Solaris, but the offer was not yet available for the short 9 or 10 meter buses. Therefore, the Neoplan K4010TD low-entry midibus with two doors was built with a length of 9.5 meters. However, only 3 were built and all were sold to Świdnica. Solaris Urbino 9 replaced three of the shortest in the Neoplan N4000-series: N4007, N4009 and N4010. In 2001 Neoplan was taken over by MAN, but Neoplan Polska became a separate company named Solaris Bus & Coach, which has preserved the company tradition and assets - including models of the buses - of the Polish branch of Neoplan.

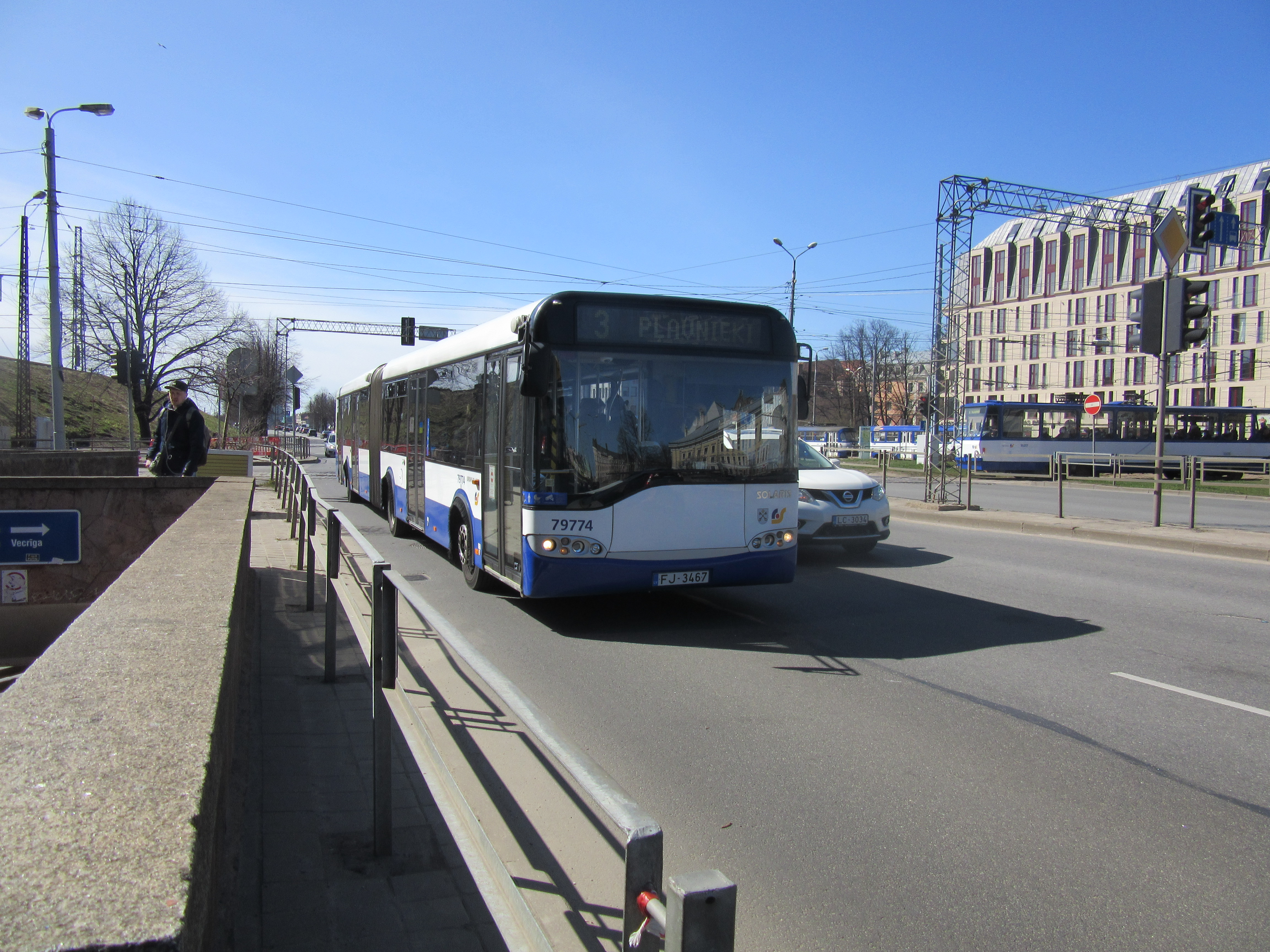
Solaris Urbino 18 First Generation in Riga

=== First generation (1999-2002) ===
The first generation Solaris Urbino 18 was produced from the second half of 1999. This model was to supplement Solaris' offer on large buses, 18-meter buses for public transportation services. The first Solaris Urbino 18 bus went to PKA Gdynia in 1999, it was also the first new low-floor articulated bus bought in 1999 by transport companies in Poland. Initially, the 18-meter buses did not sell well because the transit authorities preferred shorter and cheaper 15-meter vehicles. The bus market expanded between 1996 and 2002, which resulted in the later increase in demand for 18-meter buses. In total, cities in Poland bought 12 units of Solaris Urbino 18. Articulated vehicles were mainly built for export, most Solaris Urbino 18 were ordered by local transit authorities in Berlin and Riga. A characteristic feature of the bus are the painted railings instead of clear varnish yellow paint.

=== Second Generation (2002-2005) ===
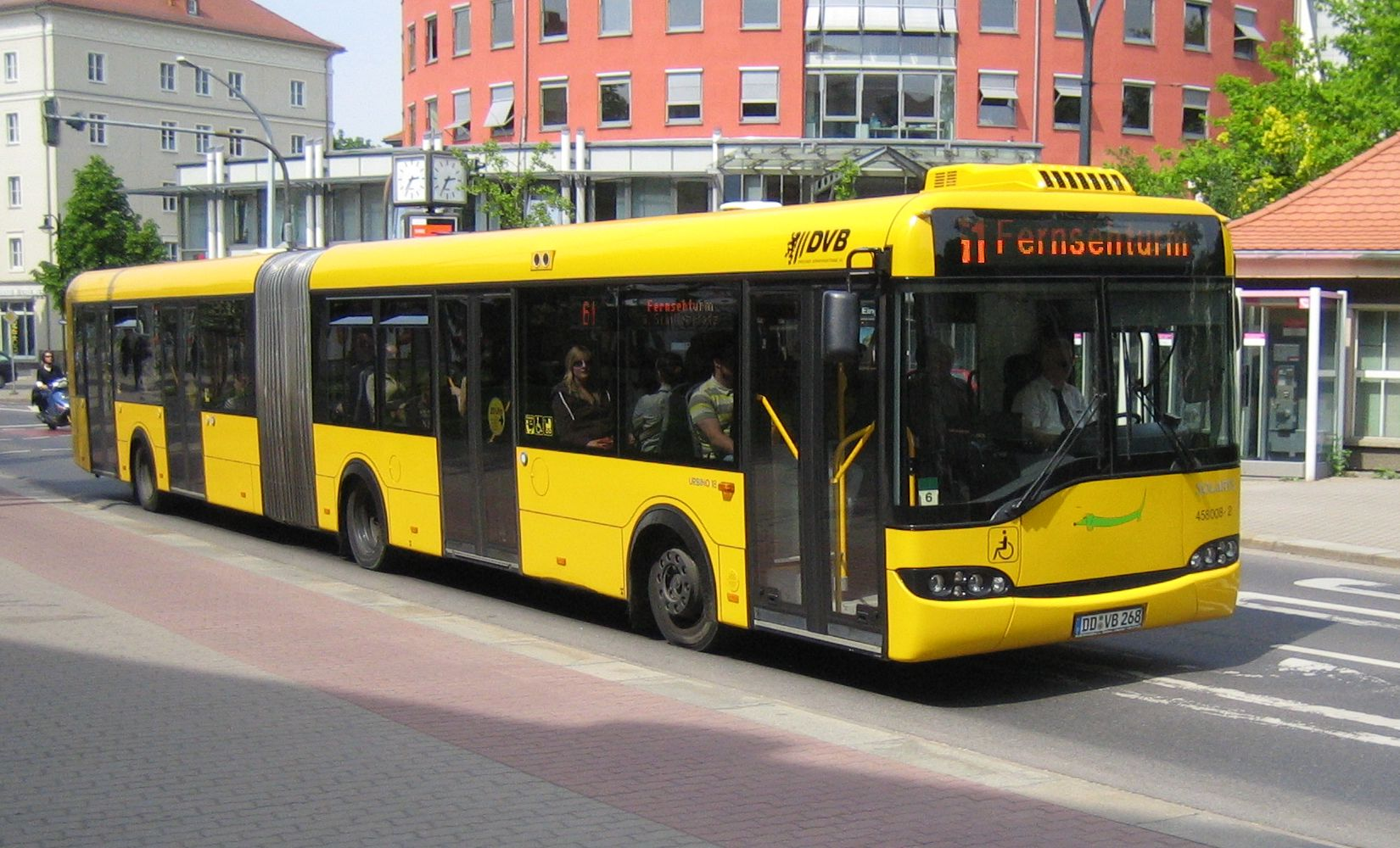
Solaris Urbino 18 Second Generation.

From the first half of 2002 Solaris produced the second-generation busses, the vehicles were treated as a temporary solution before the target model of third generation busses. Since the spring of 2005, Solaris introduced the third generation of the bus. On the basis of structure of the Solaris Urbino 18 the trolleybus Solaris Trollino 18 is being built in Bolechowo.

=== Third Generation ===
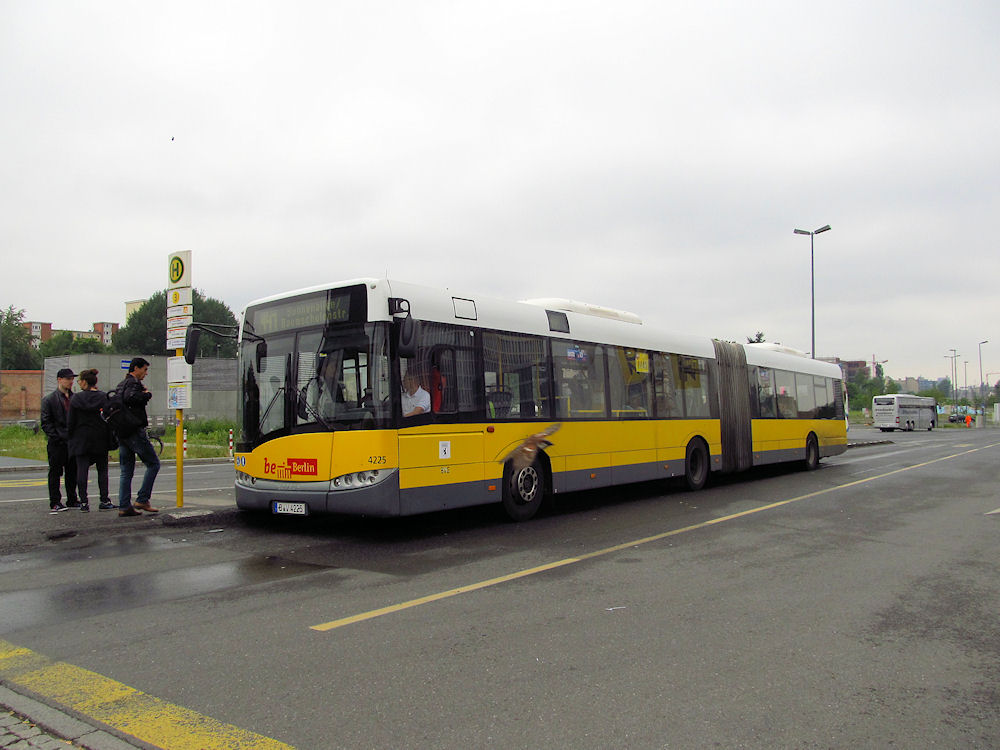
Third generation Solaris Urbino 18 in Berlin

A major order by MZA Warsaw in 2005, resulted in the significant increase of the sale of the Solaris Urbino 18 in Poland.

In December 2006, Olsztyn was the first Polish city to receive 8 units of the Solaris Urbino 18 model which meets the Euro V emissian standard, which came as standard for new vehicles in 2009. There are also 200 Solaris Urbino 18 III vehicles in Belgrade. They were first in yellow and blue paint, but were later changed to red paint. Garage numbers go from 3000 to 3199.

=== Solaris Urbino 18 CNG ===
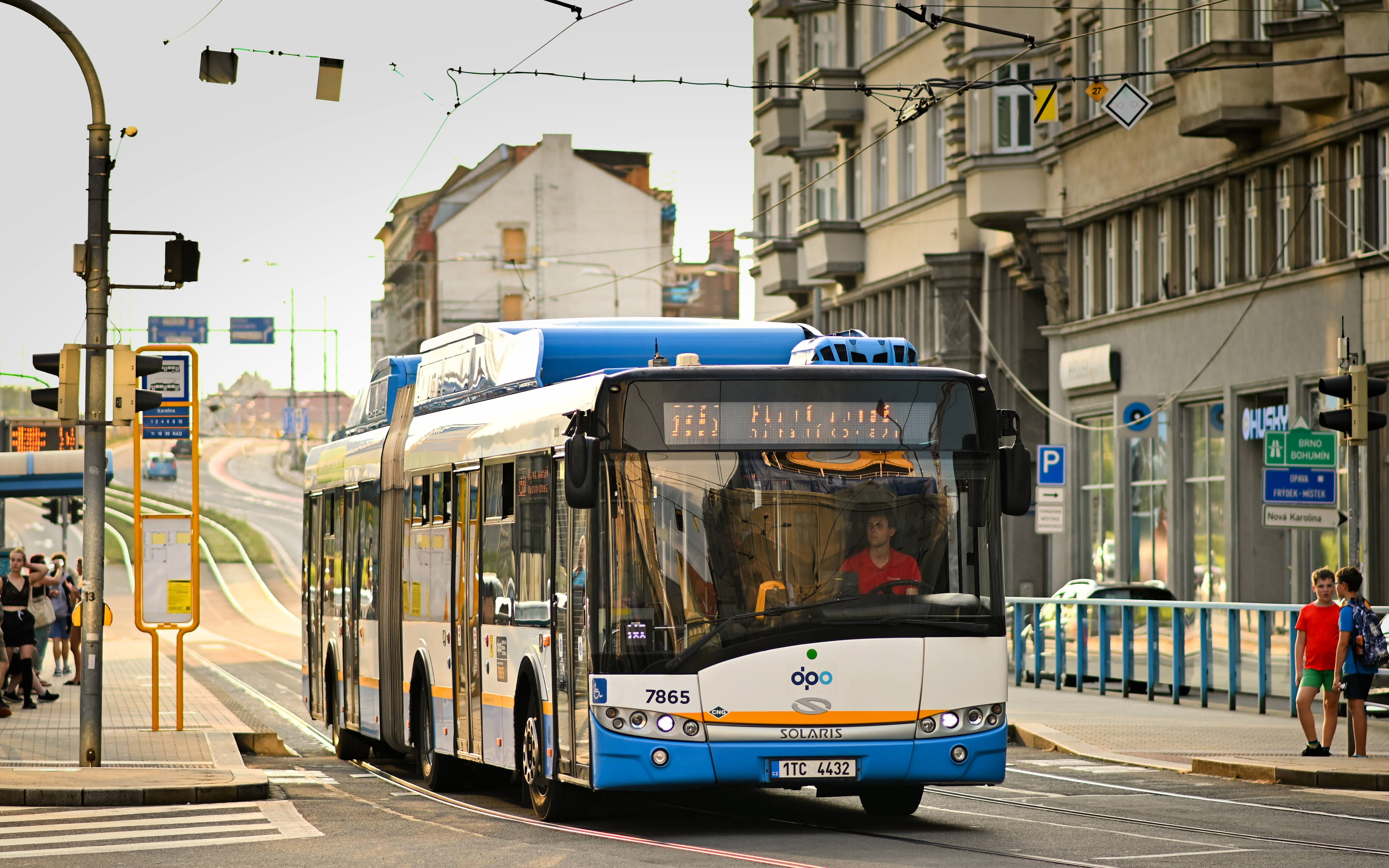
Solaris Urbino 18 CNG in Ostrava

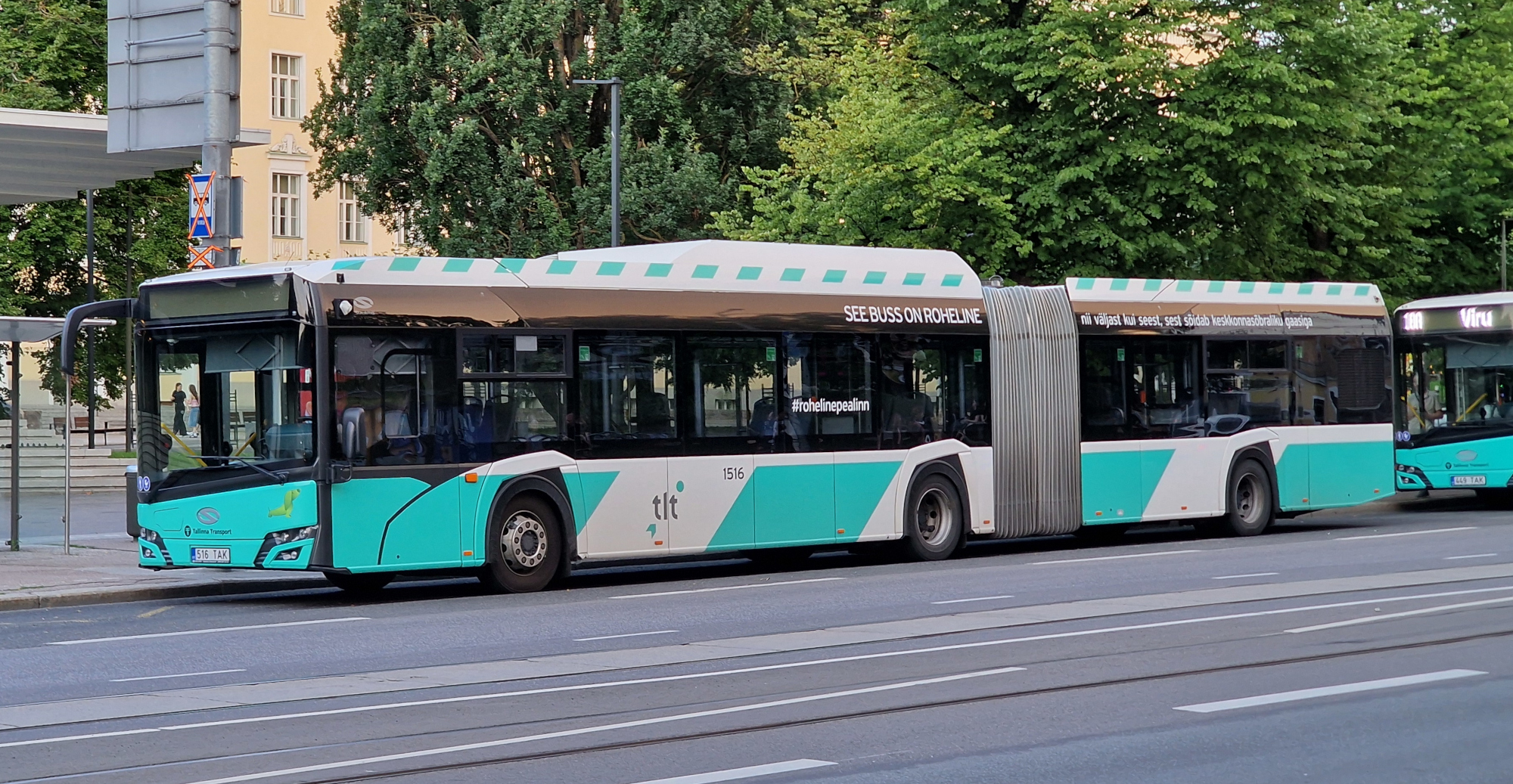
Solaris Urbino 18 CNG in Tallinn

Since 2005, there are variants of using LPG and CNG. The first Solaris Urbino 18 CNG went to Lublin in November 2006, in October 2009 another was sold to Radom in Poland. The second bus was intended to go to Norway, but the contract was reversed, and it is used as a test vehicle. A low-entry version was built which is named Solaris Urbino 18 CNG LE. Like the previous vehicle, it now serves as a test vehicle.

=== Solaris Urbino 18 Hybrid ===
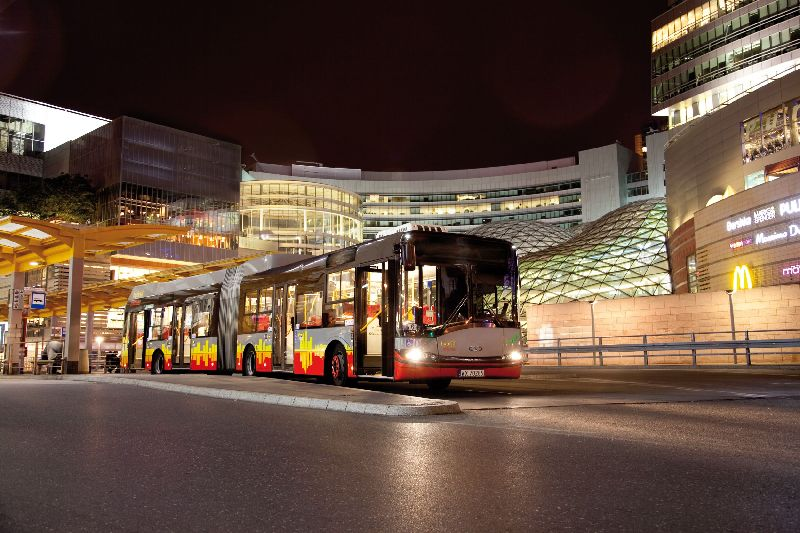
Solaris Urbino 18 Hybrid

The first generation of Solaris Urbino 18 Hybrid was built between 2006 and 2008. From the second half of 2008, the models are built in the second generation. They have been produced by the use of the similarities of the Solaris Urbino 18.

The characteristic of the Urbino 18 is a green dachshund. Various hybrid versions include specific symbols. The hybrid models have a dachshund which is in between two hearts which symbolise the two type of power.

During the production of the Solaris Urbino 18 Hybrid model, there have been implemented four types of hybrid power systems. The different versions can be distinguished by the difference in the interior, like that of the Paris transportation system BRT type - BHNS, which differentiates from the Solaris Urbino series bus family.

From the autumn of 2010, 18 buses have been produced with the Allison I and Allison II transmission.

=== Solaris Urbino 18 Fourth Generation ===
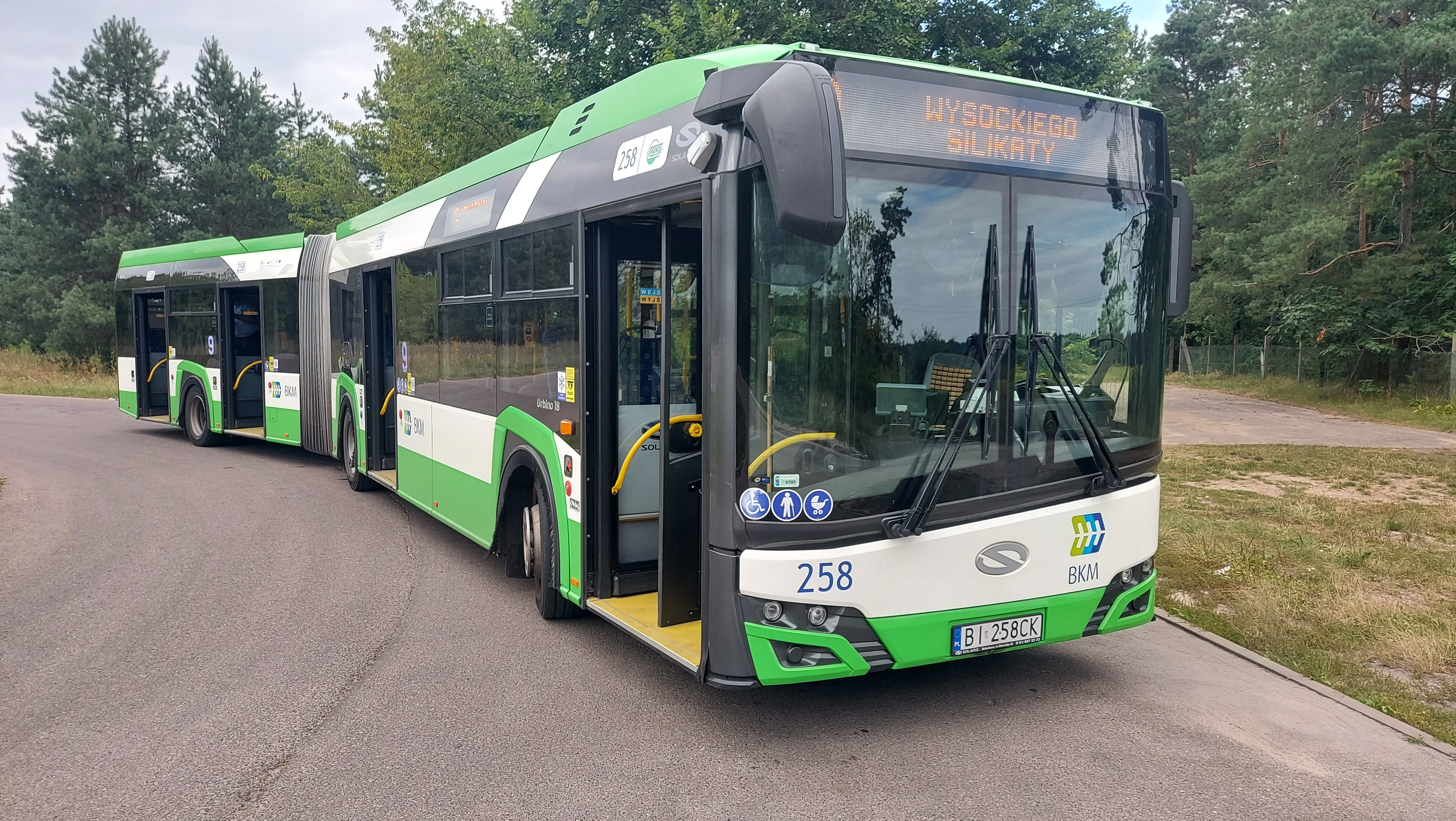
Fourth generation Solaris Urbino 18 in Białystok

On the September 24 2014, after ten years of production of the third generation Solaris Urbino, Solaris Bus & Coach unveiled a new generation of Solaris buses. During this year's trade fair in Hannover at the world premiere (end of September) and at the Transexpo Trade Fair in Kielce in early October Solaris showed two prototypes - Urbino 12 and Urbino 18 in their fourth generation, and will in the future include other models in this generation like the Urbino LE and Urbino Hybrid. The new buses claimed to be more durable, lighter and more refined in terms of design and construction when compared to the previous generation busses. The noise was also reduced and there is almost no vibration throughout the vehicle. The entire vehicle is illuminated with LED light.
