= Solaris Urbino 12 =

Polish bus series produced since 1999

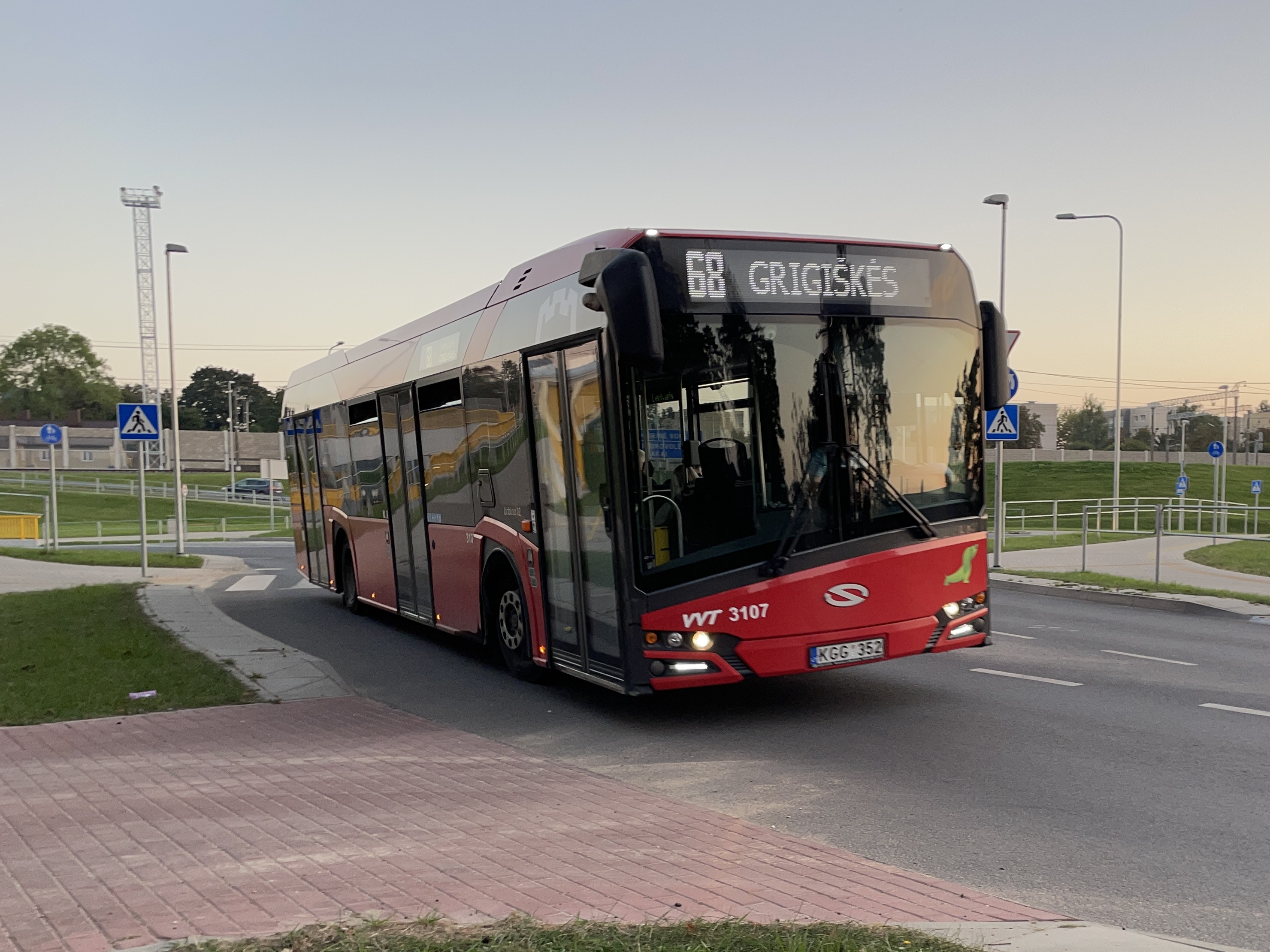

Overview
- Manufacturer: Solaris Bus & Coach
- Production: 1999-present
- Assembly: Bolechowo, Poland

Body and chassis
- Class: Single-deck city-bus
- Doors: 3 doors
- Floor type: Low floor

Powertrain
- Engine: 1) MAN D0826LOH17; 2) Cummins ISB6.7EV 225B; 3) DAF PR183
- Capacity: 105; 85 (SU12 electric)
- Power output: 1) 162 kW (220 ps); 2) 165 kW (225 ps); 3) 184 kW (250 ps)
- Transmission: 1) Voith Diwa D864.3E; 2) Voith Diwa D864.3E; 3) Voith Diwa D864.5

Dimensions
- Length: 12000 mm (12.0 metres)
- Width: 2550 mm
- Height: 2850 mm

Chronology
- Predecessor: Neoplan N4016; Neoplan K4016TD

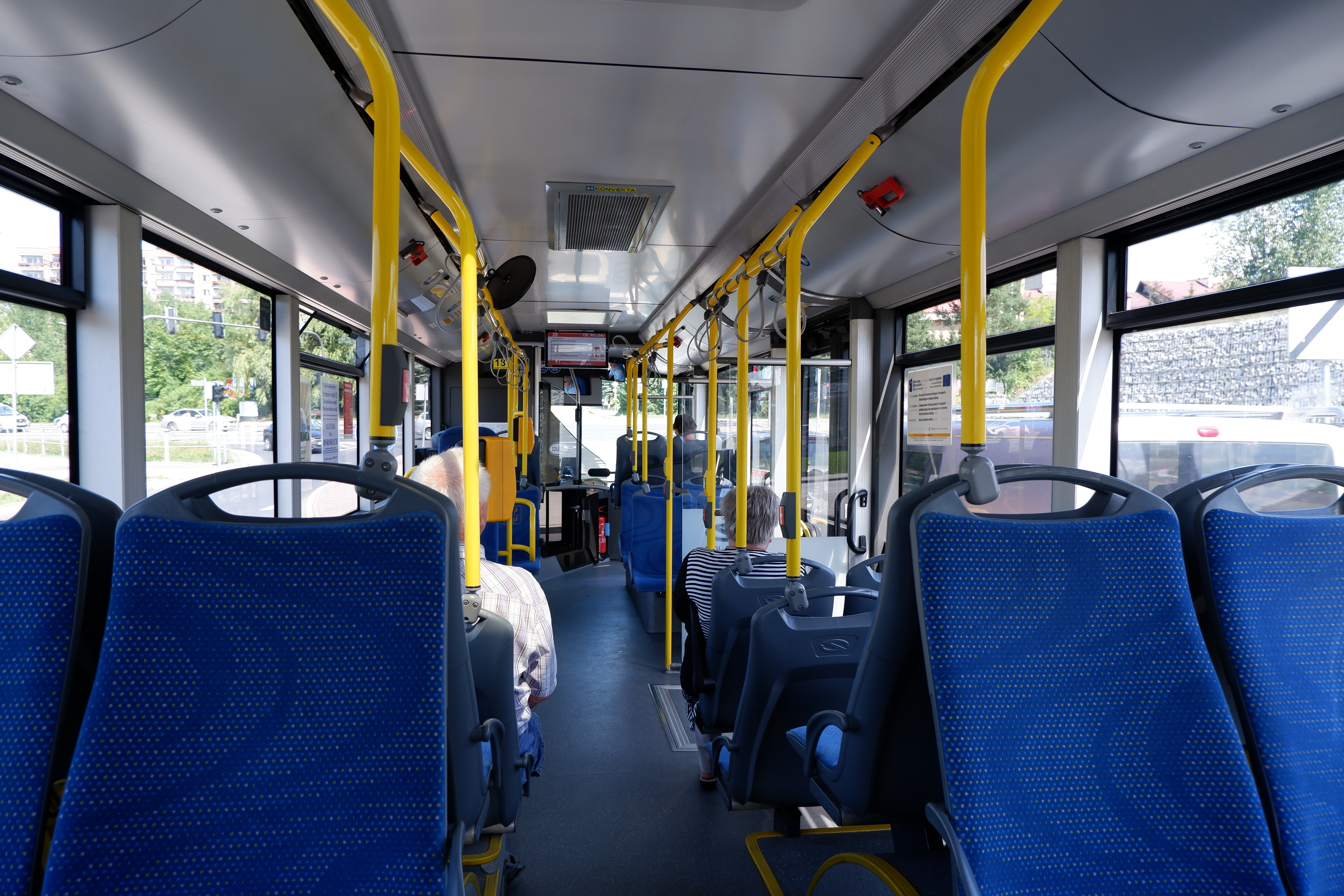
Interior of a Solaris Urbino 12 (IV generation)

Solaris Urbino 12 is a series of 12.0-metre low-floor buses from the Solaris Urbino series designed for public transport, produced since 1999 by the Polish company Solaris Bus & Coach in Bolechowo near Poznań in Poland. Since 2010 a hybrid version has been produced, a purely electric version was introduced in 2013 and a hydrogen fuel powered version has been produced since 2020. It has a length of 12.0 metres.

== History ==
=== Solaris Urbino 12 ===
Solaris Urbino 12 Generations

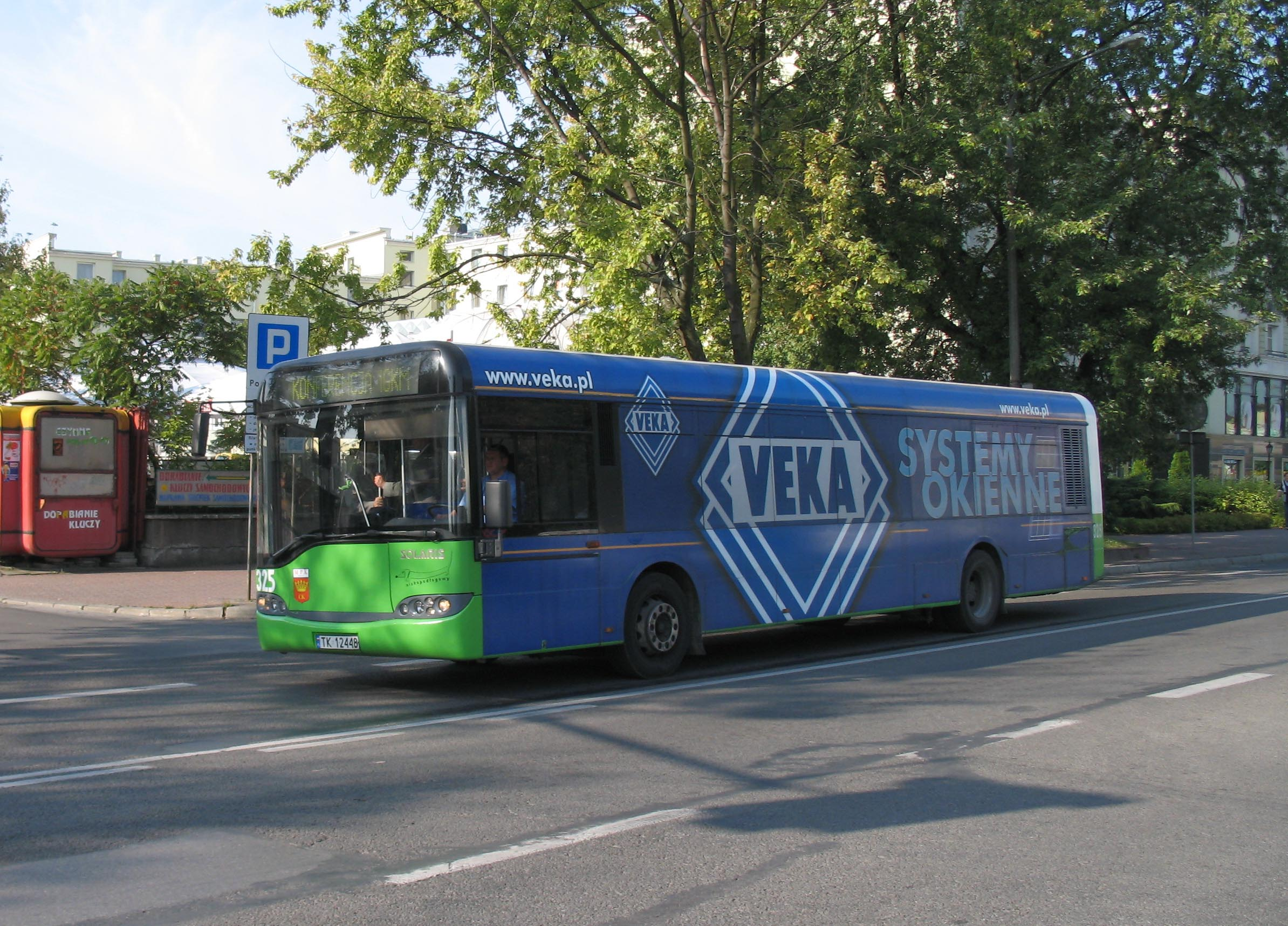
Solaris Urbino 12 of I generation in Kielce

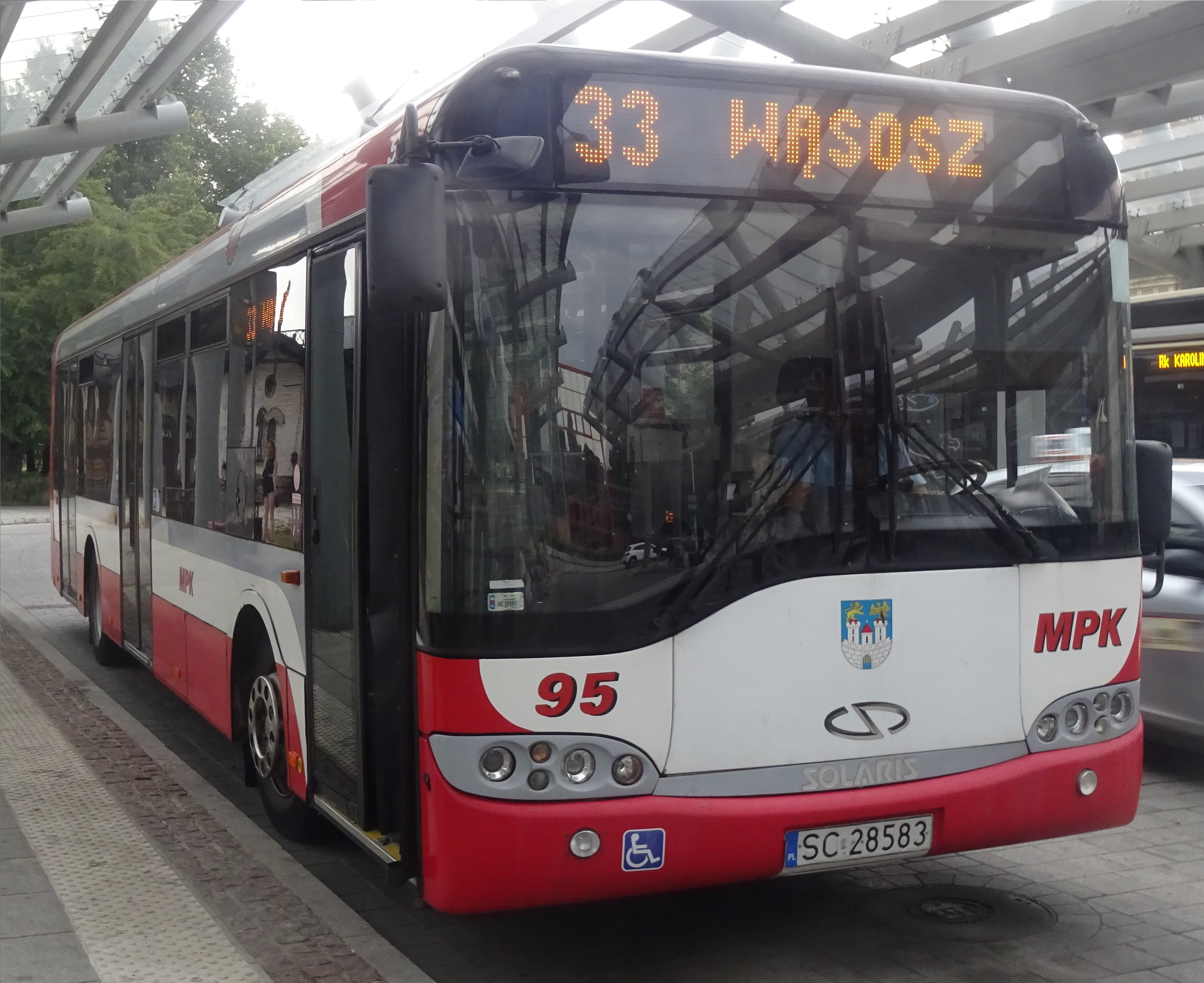
Solaris Urbino 12 of II generation in Częstochowa

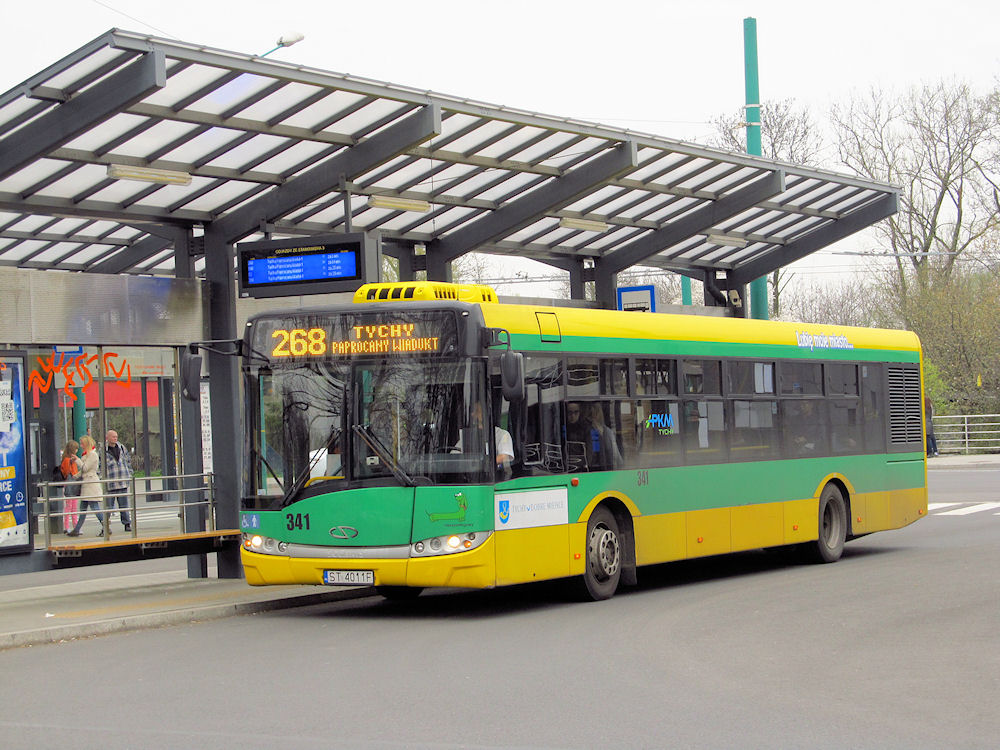
Solaris Urbino 12 of III generation in Tychy

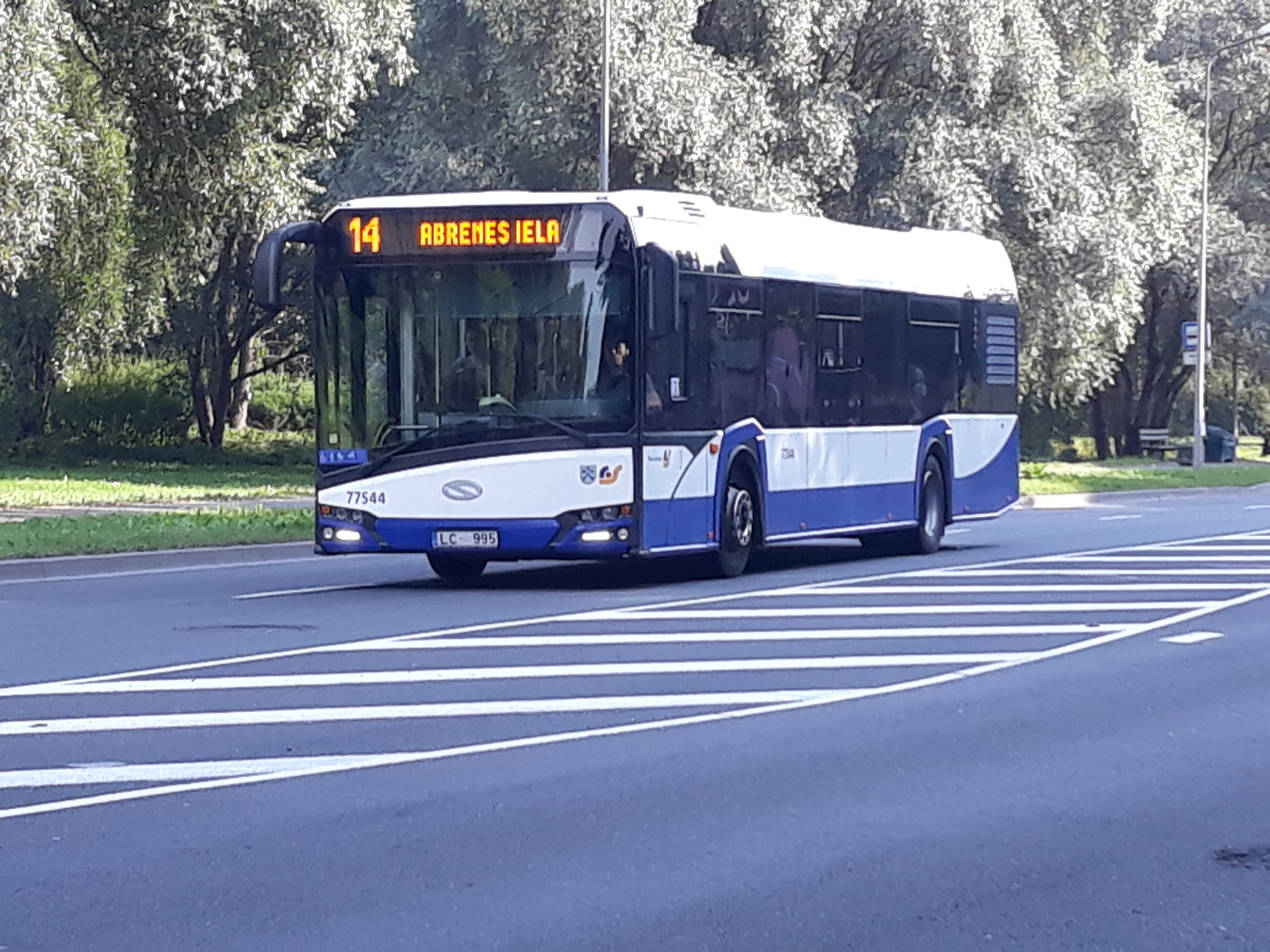
Solaris Urbino 12 of IV generation in Riga

Solaris Urbino 12 of IV generation in Tallinn

Solaris Urbino 12 series were the first of the new series of Solaris 12.0 metre buses. It is the most popular model series in the history of the brand. Urbino 12 debuted in mid-1999 during an International Trade Fair. Since the turn of 2001-2002 the series produced its second generation. Since 2005 the series had produced the third generation of the bus. During the Transexpo Trade Fair in 2008 in Kielce the new prototype for the Solaris Urbino series was branded as the New Edition Generation 3.5. The structure for the fourth generation uses the same one like that of the third generation of buses. The refurbished interior has more lighting located behind the green overhead panels. The panel extends for the entire length of the bus roof in the central part of the bus. Another innovative solution was to hide the engine compartment with first passengers of the bus.

Solaris Urbino 12 series buses are produced in diesel versions (which meet the standard for Euro VI). Since 2005, there is a variety of LPG CNG. The most sold with diesel engines are from DAF Trucks. Less frequently used were MAN engines. They have been used mainly to 2004, and again for a short period from 2006, but due to the policy of the company to only supply vehicles tailored for CNG. Alternatively, the manufacturer began to use the Cummins ISBe4 250B type diesel engines with the standard Euro IV and ISBe5 250B in Euro V.

The Urbino 12 LE buses are produced for low-entry suburban variety with diesel, CNG or biogas power.

Graphic symbol of Solaris Urbino 12 model is green dachshund, placed on most buses, always on the front wall on the right side of the vehicle. With the introduction of the third-generation models the look of the graphic symbol has been slightly modified.

=== Solaris Urbino 12 Hybrid ===
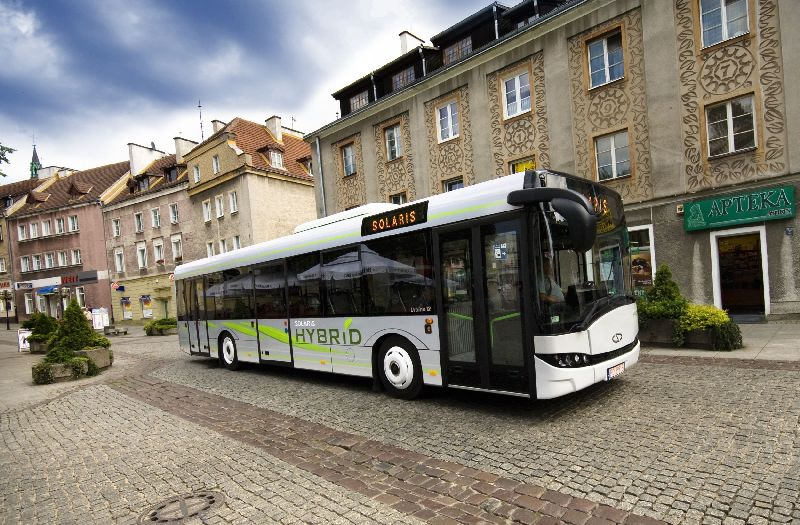
Solaris Urbino 12 III Hybrid

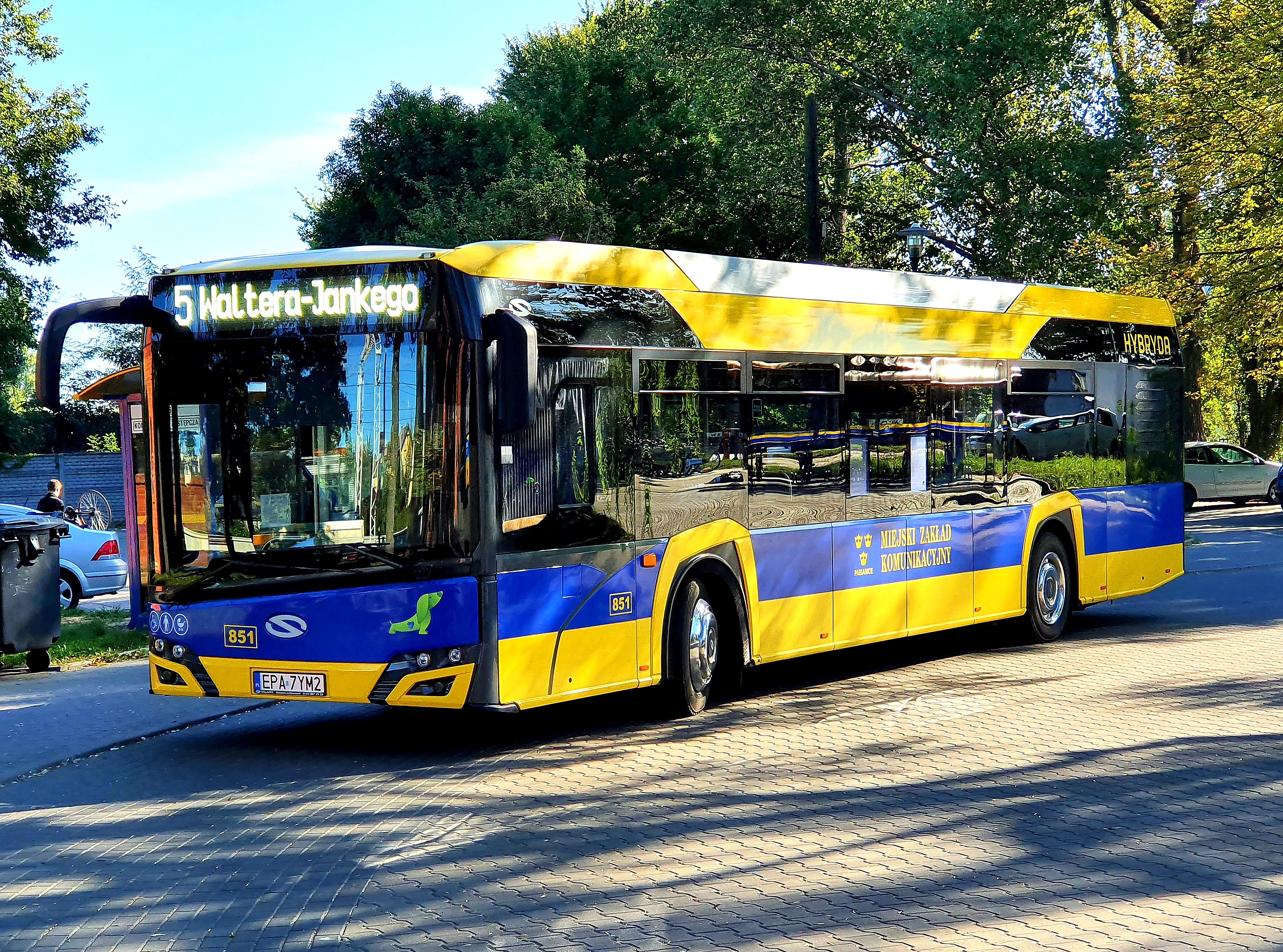
Solaris Urbino 12 IV Hybrid in Pabianice (Poland)

In the second half of 2009, a prototype Solaris Urbino 12 Hybrid based on third generation of Solaris Urbino 12 was built. The model made its debut at the Busworld Trade Fair in Kortrijk in October 2009. The series production began in 2010.

The Solaris Urbino 12 Hybrid uses a parallel hybrid system HDU made by the American company Eaton. It comprises inter alia with a 6-speed Eaton automatic gearbox and one electric motor with maximum power of 44 kW (60 hp). In normal traffic movement the power is on about 28 kW (38 hp). It operates with a Cummins ISB6.7EV 225B diesel engine, meeting the requirements of the EEV standard, with a maximum power of 165 kW (225 hp) and the volume of 6.7 dm. The Eaton gearbox transmits power to the rear axle. All batteries are lithium-ion (Li-Ion) made by the Japanese company Hitachi which have been placed under the platforms inside the vehicle. By this the appearance of the bus has changed and the look is different when compared with the traditional diesel engine powered buses. The cost of this system is about 70 thousand Euros, now they are used in Rome and other cities like Vilnius.

The graphic symbol of the Solaris Urbino 12 Hybrid buses is a green dachshund with two overlapping hearts symbolising the dual drive system.

=== Solaris Urbino 12 Ü ===
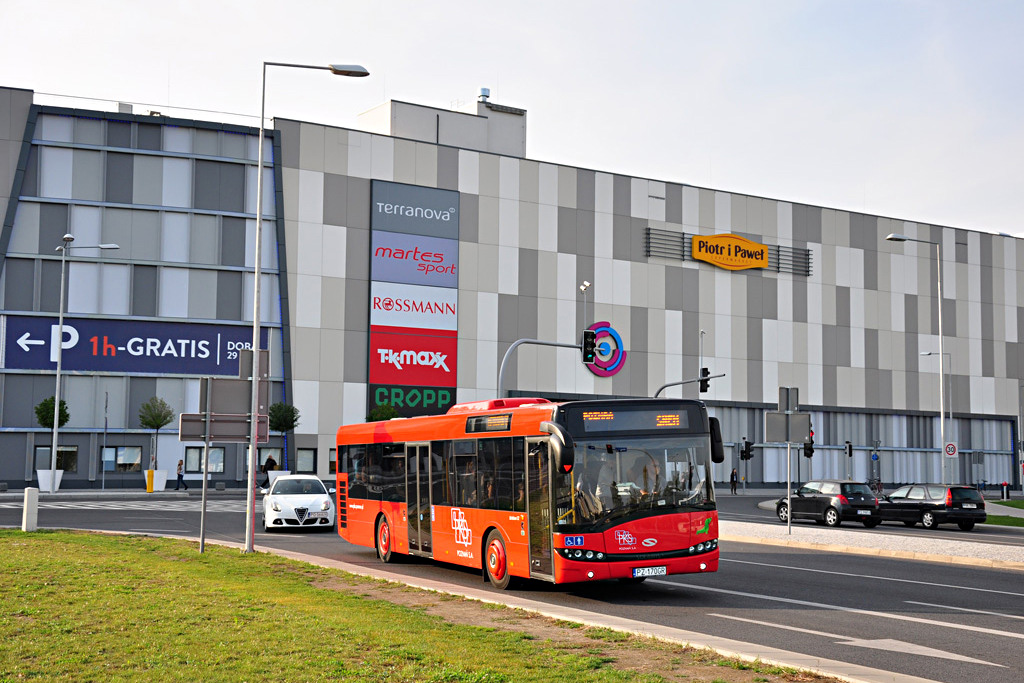
Solaris Urbino 12 Ü

Solaris Urbino 12 Ü buses are typically used for urban and interurban commuter public transportation services, the model made its debut at the IAA Nutzfahrzeuge Trade Fair in Hannover in September 2012. Instead of the classic box shaped look, the front and whole look has a bow shape. The mainly used MAN D2066 LUH 48 engine has a capacity of 10.5 dm^{3} and a maximum power of 265 kW (360 hp) and which works with the automatic transmission Voith DIWA.5 or ZF EcoLife. The front axle is independently suspended ZF RL 75 EC, and the drive axle is ZF AV 132. The number of seats increased to 44, located on the sides. Options include a Webasto Spheros air conditioning system.

=== Solaris Urbino 12 electric ===
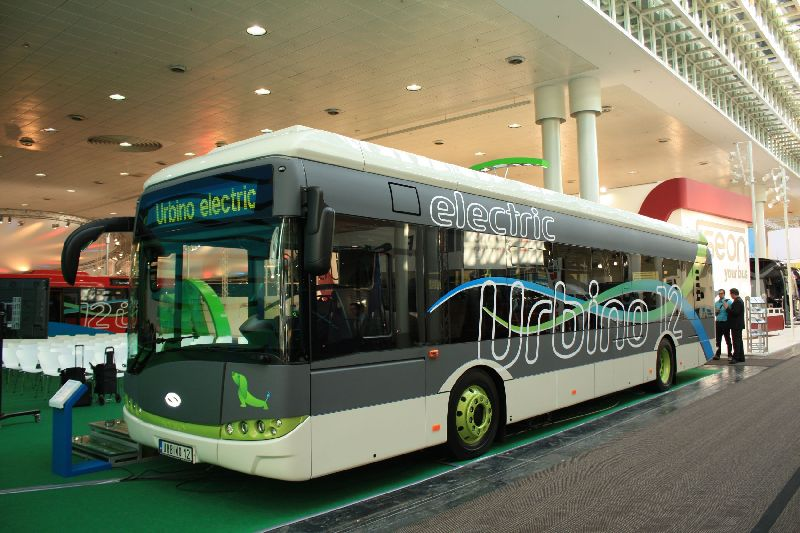
Solaris Urbino 12 III Electric

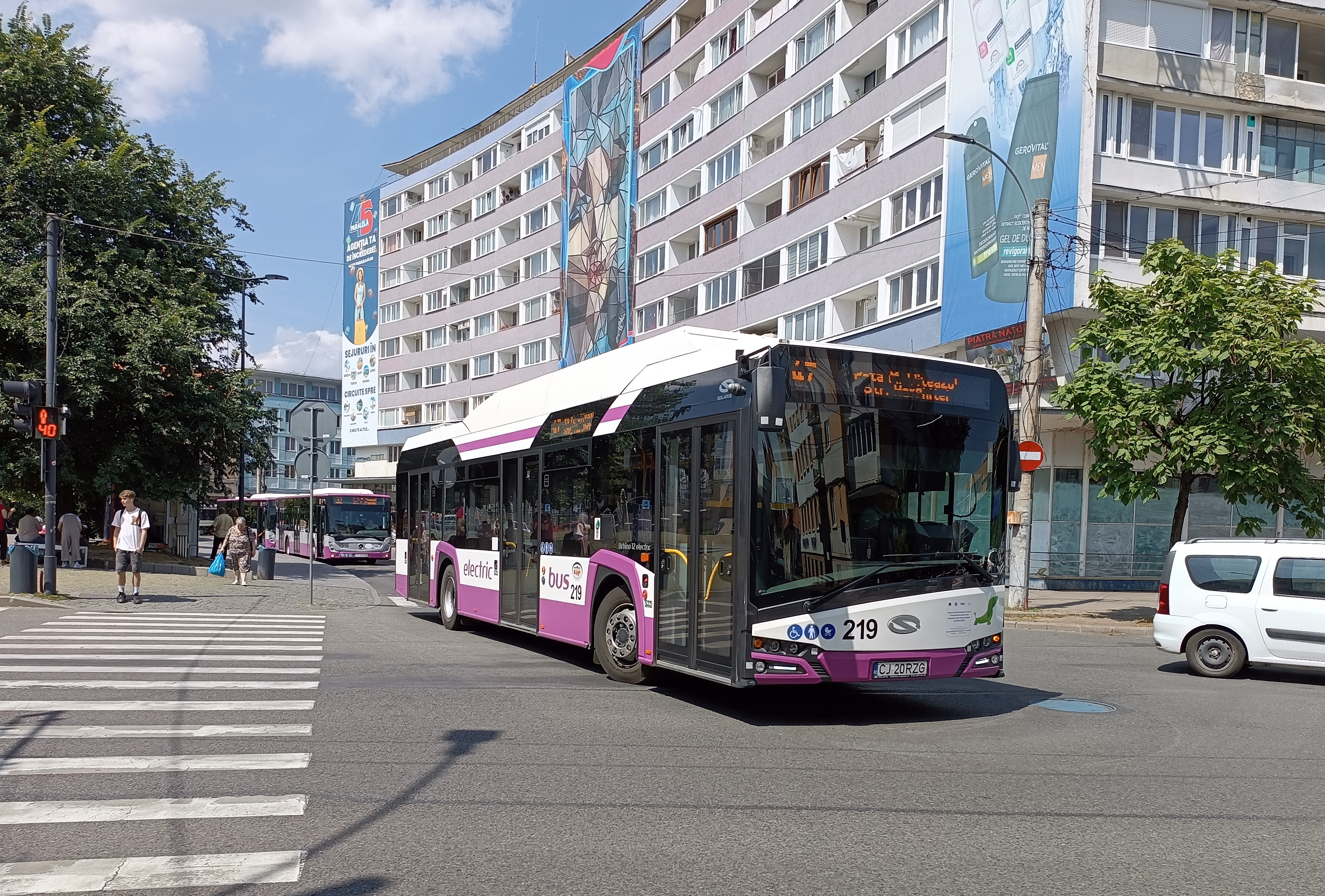
A Solaris Urbino 12 IV Electric in Cluj-Napoca

At the IAA Nutzfahrzeuge Fair Trade in Hannover in September 2012 the new Solaris Urbino 12 electric was shown which debuted as electric prototype from the Solaris Urbino 12 family. In the third quarter of 2013, the bus was manufactured and was delivered to the Braunschweiger Verkehrs-AG company, in Braunschweig, Germany. This was done as part of a program to research and implement new technology into public transportation services, the project was funded by the German Federal Ministry of Transport.

The prototype bus was equipped with an innovative system of Bombardier PRIMOVE, allowing inductive charging without connecting cables. The drive system uses an electric drive system by Vossloh Kiepe GmbH made in Düsseldorf. The motor was centrally mounted by 4 poles with the asynchronous motor which has a maximum power output of 160 kW (1400 Nm) and allows the use of standard axles: ZF AV 132, and the independently sprung axle ZF RL 75 EC. Energy recovered during braking is stored in the lithium-ion batteries with a capacity of 210 kWh. The vehicle is also equipped with a plug-in connector that allows you to connect additional to an external energy source. All devices in the vehicle, which are usually powered by a diesel engine have been electrified. The air conditioning system has a built-Konvekta UL500EM CO_{2} heat pump, which is also used for heating the vehicle.

=== Solaris Urbino 12 hydrogen ===
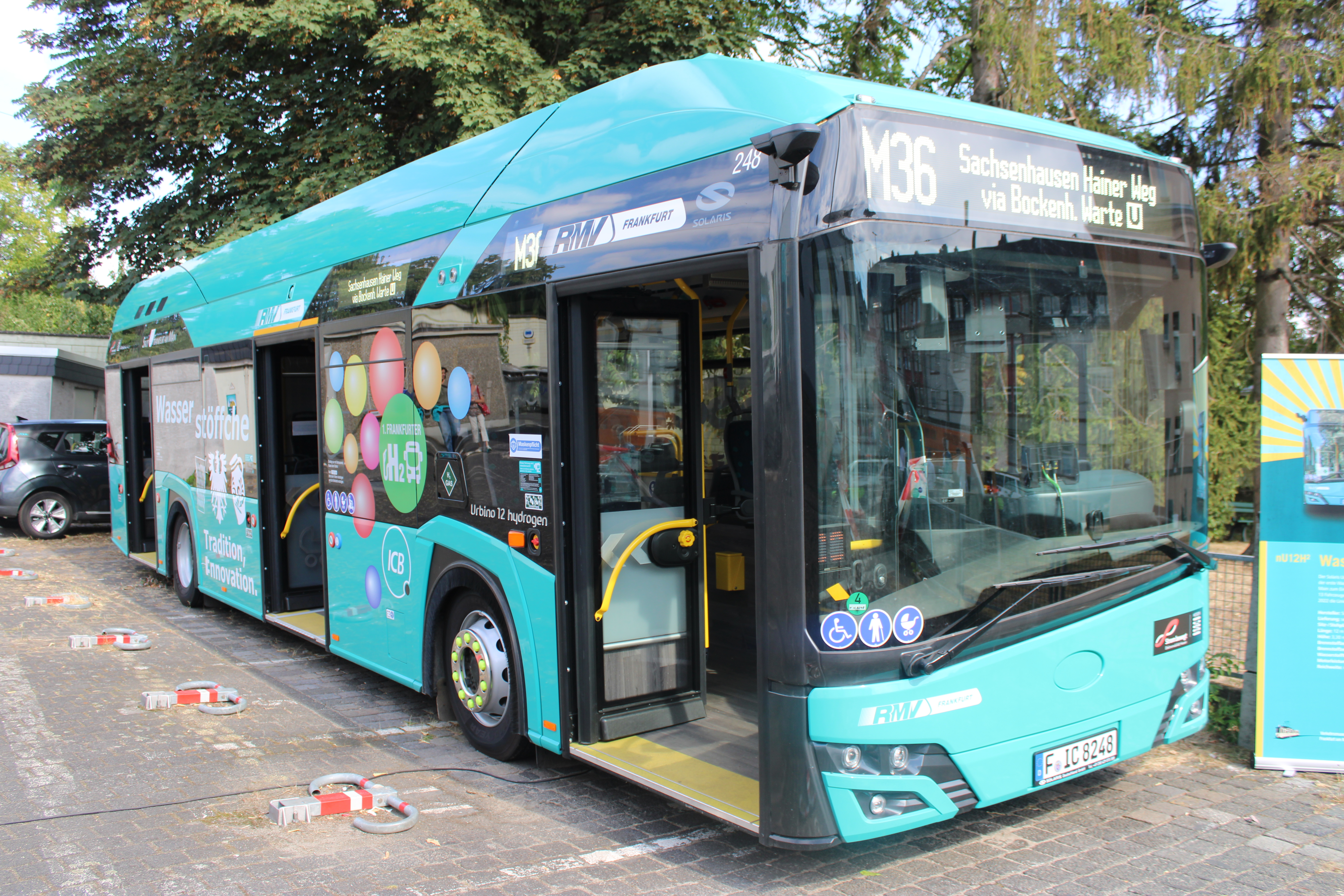
Solaris Urbino 12 hydrogen

In June 2018, it was announced that the premiere of the Solaris Urbino 12 hydrogen city bus with a drive system based 100% on hydrogen is planned for the next year. Even before the premiere of the bus, the Urbino 12 hydrogen was awarded the prize by the German magazine "Busplaner" in the "concept vehicle" category. In April 2019, the new vehicle was shown for the first time at the MZK Piła depot, where it underwent several days of tests.

In May 2019, Solaris secured its first order for the Urbino 12 hydrogen. Ten of the new model, with an option for two more, are scheduled to be delivered to Bolzano, Italy, in 2020. The first carrier to receive Solaris Urbino 12 hydrogen buses was RVK from Cologne in 2021.

== Trademark symbol ==
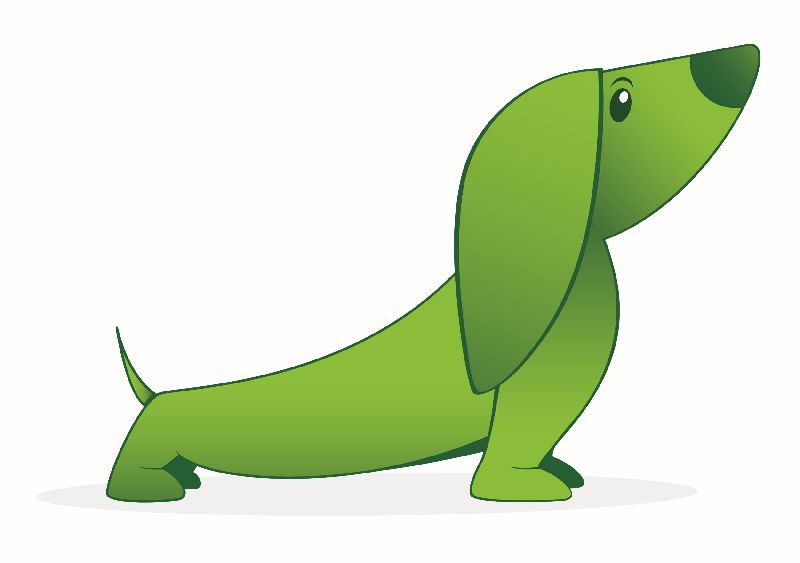
Green Dachshund.

The trademark symbol for the Urbino bus series is a green dachshund. Different versions of buses have symbols with different details. Dachshund hybrid models have two hearts symbolising a dual drive system, and ecological models in EEV version have a dachshund holding a flower in its mouth. The dachshunds on part of the models sold to Kraków wear a rogatywka.
