= 216 Cardiff–Bristol Airport =

England-Wales bus route

216

Overview
- Operator: Edwards Coaches on behalf of National Express Coaches
- Status: Operating
- Began service: March 2015

Route
- Start: Cardiff
- Via: Newport
- End: Bristol Airport

Route 216 is a bus route that operates between Cardiff, Wales, and Bristol Airport, England, via Cardiff University and Newport railway station.

On 11 March 2013, Greyhound UK extended its service from Swansea to Cardiff to terminate at Bristol Airport. However, in February 2015 Greyhound UK announced that the Cardiff to Bristol Airport section would be withdrawn. Route 216 was introduced in March 2015 as a replacement for the Greyhound service. It is operated by Edwards Coaches on behalf of National Express. Route number 216 was chosen to commemorate Concorde 216, the last Concorde aircraft to complete a safe flight.

Six buses operate in each direction per day.
