= 2007 M4 motorway coach accident =

Motor vehicle incident in England

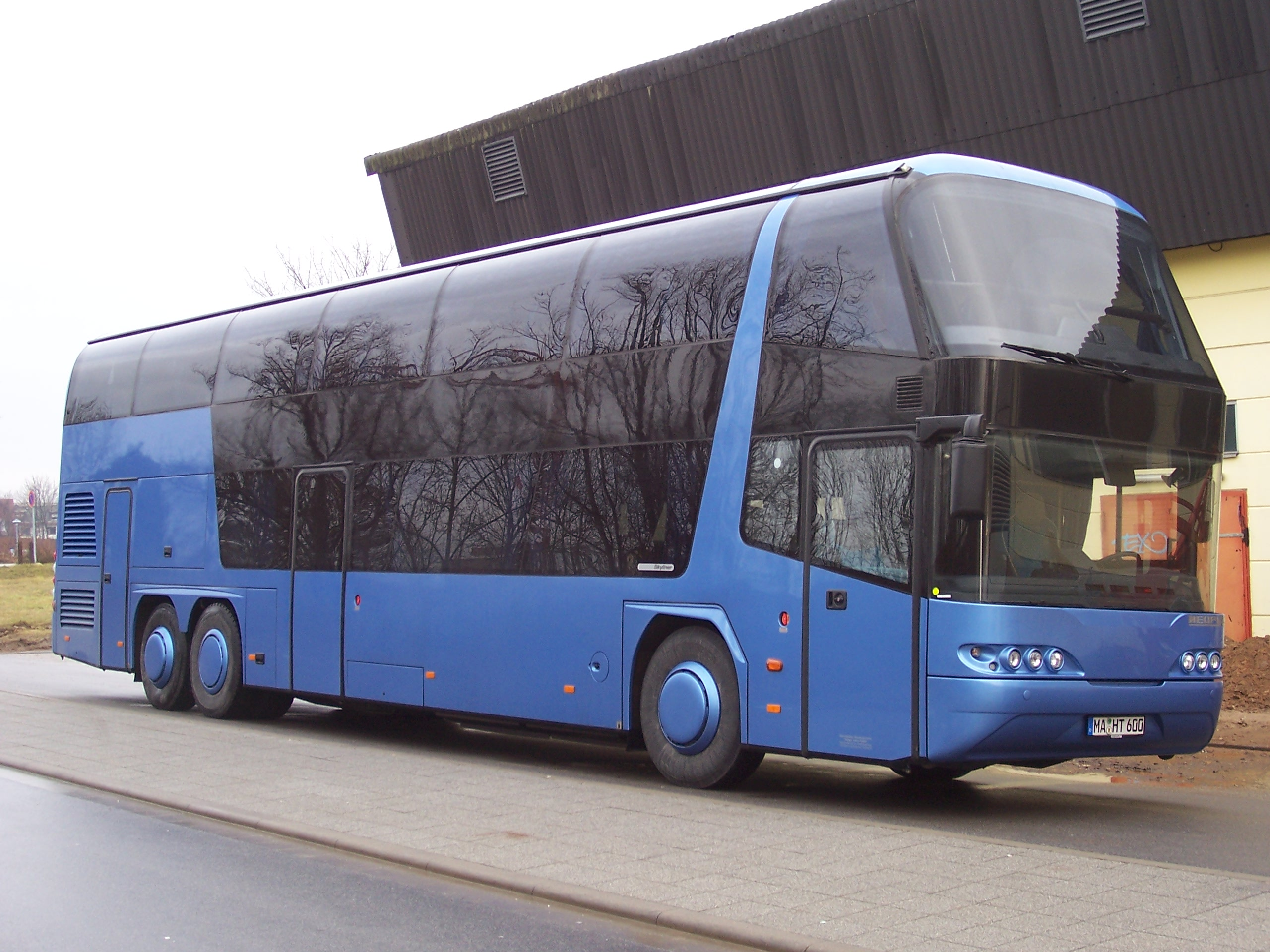
- A Neoplan Skyliner similar to that involved
- Date: 3 January 2007
- Time: 23:45 (GMT)
- Location: Thorney Interchange; 51.4983°N 0.4961°W
- Deaths: 3
- Convicted: Philip Rooney
- Convictions: Causing death by dangerous driving (3 counts)
- Sentence: 5 year's imprisonment

On 3 January 2007, a National Express coach overturned at the Thorney Interchange near London, killing three passengers and causing life-changing injuries to four others. The service had left Victoria Coach Station 30 minutes late, and the coach driver was found to have been speeding on the journey before losing control and crashing on a motorway sliproad. In 2008, He was sentenced to five years' imprisonment for causing death by dangerous driving.

== Background ==
The National Express Neoplan Skyliner was operating route 592 between Victoria Coach Station in London and Aberdeen Coach Park. Its scheduled stops were Heathrow Airport, Carlisle, Hamilton, Glasgow and Dundee. The service left Victoria at 22:30 GMT, delayed by approximately 30 minutes by problems stowing passenger luggage. It was due to arrive in Aberdeen at 10:30 on 4 January.

The coach driver was Philip Rooney, who had been driving coaches for 15 years and had five previous speeding convictions in passenger vehicles as well as receiving a disciplinary for having tampered with a speed limiter.

The Thorney Interchange is a system of slip roads connecting the M4 and M25 motorways near London. The slip road on which the incident occurred has a negative gradient and long right-hand curve of decreasing radius, with a signposted advisory speed limit of 40 miles per hour (64 km/h).

== Incident ==
After making the service's first planned stop at Heathrow Airport, Rooney drove the 69 passengers west on the M4. Shortly thereafter, at approximately 23:45, he joined the northbound sliproad for the M25 at 55 miles per hour (89 km/h). Rooney was making a passenger safety announcement when he lost control of the vehicle and collided with the offside crash barrier before impacting the nearside kerb and overturning.

Five fire appliances, twenty London ambulances, eight doctors and one specialist fire service unit attended the accident scene. The injured were treated at six different hospitals; thirty-six passengers were taken to Hillingdon Hospital, sixteen to Charing Cross Hospital, seven to West Middlesex Hospital, four to St Peter's Hospital. One child was taken to St. Mary's Hospital in Paddington, and another to Wexham Park Hospital in Slough.

The crash killed three people. A 30-year-old Chinese man and a 76-year-old Scottish woman were killed at the scene, while a 78-year-old man from Surrey died from his injuries on 1 July. Four passengers' injuries necessitated limb amputations. Many passengers were cut from the wreckage by firefighters using special cutting equipment.

== Investigation ==
The coach was removed from the motorway for subsequent investigation. Rooney was arrested on suspicion of causing death by dangerous driving, and released on bail. Following police investigations, Rooney was charged with three counts of causing death by dangerous driving.

National Express removed its remaining 11 Neoplan Skyliners from service for safety checks. The coaches were relatively new at the time of the crash, having been delivered in October 2006. The vast majority of the National Express fleet comprises single-deck coaches, and its services were not significantly affected by the recall. Neoplan announced on 5 January that all the coaches had passed their safety checks, with no safety problems or defects being found. Neoplan stated that they were ready to return to service "as and when the operator wishes".

=== Legal proceedings ===
At a hearing in January 2008, Rooney denied all three charges of causing death by dangerous driving. He was bailed to appear at Oxford Crown Court on 8 September, with his trial due to begin on 27 October.

Before the beginning of the trial, Rooney changed his plea to guilty of all three counts of causing death by dangerous driving.

On 26 November, Rooney appeared at Oxford Crown Court where Mr Justice Gross jailed him for five years and banned from driving for a further three years. The court heard that Rooney had five previous convictions for speeding in passenger vehicles. Tachograph evidence showed he had repeatedly exceeded speed limits on the January 2007 journey, and his heavy braking had caused luggage to fall from the overhead baggage racks. In December 2004, Rooney had been disciplined by his employer for tampering with a speed limiter. Witnesses to the crash described him as "[driving] like a man possessed".

== See also ==
- 2007 M1 motorway coach accident, a National Express coach overturned later that year
