= Edwards Coaches =

British bus operating company

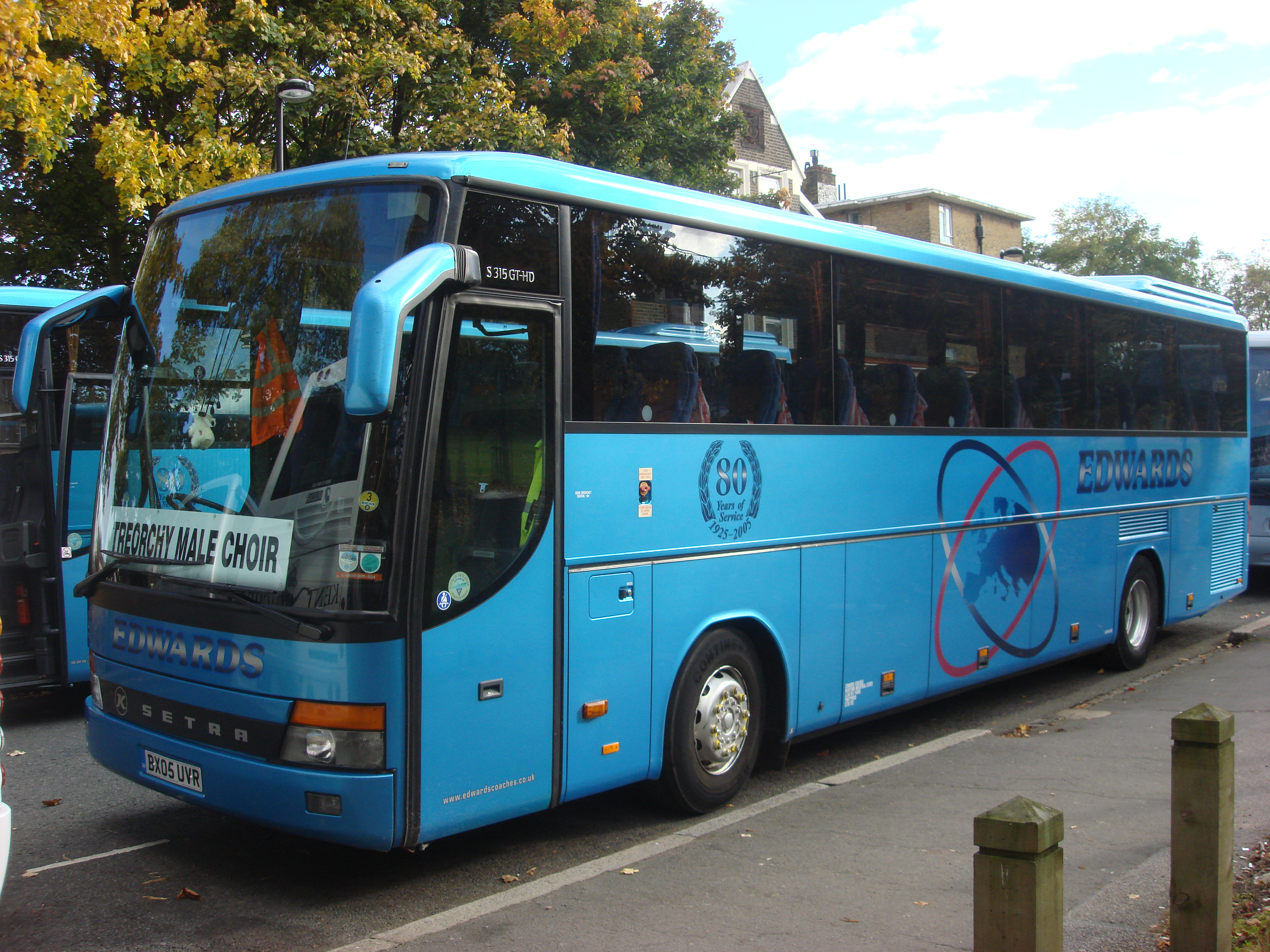
- Setra S 315 GT-HD in Vauxhall in 2008
- Parent: Mike Edwards
- Founded: 1925
- Headquarters: Llantrisant
- Service area: South Wales, Bristol
- Service type: Bus & Coach services
- Fleet: 225 (October 2014)
- Website: www.edwardscoaches.co.uk

Edwards Coaches is a family-owned coach company based in Llantrisant, near Pontypridd in South Wales.

== History ==
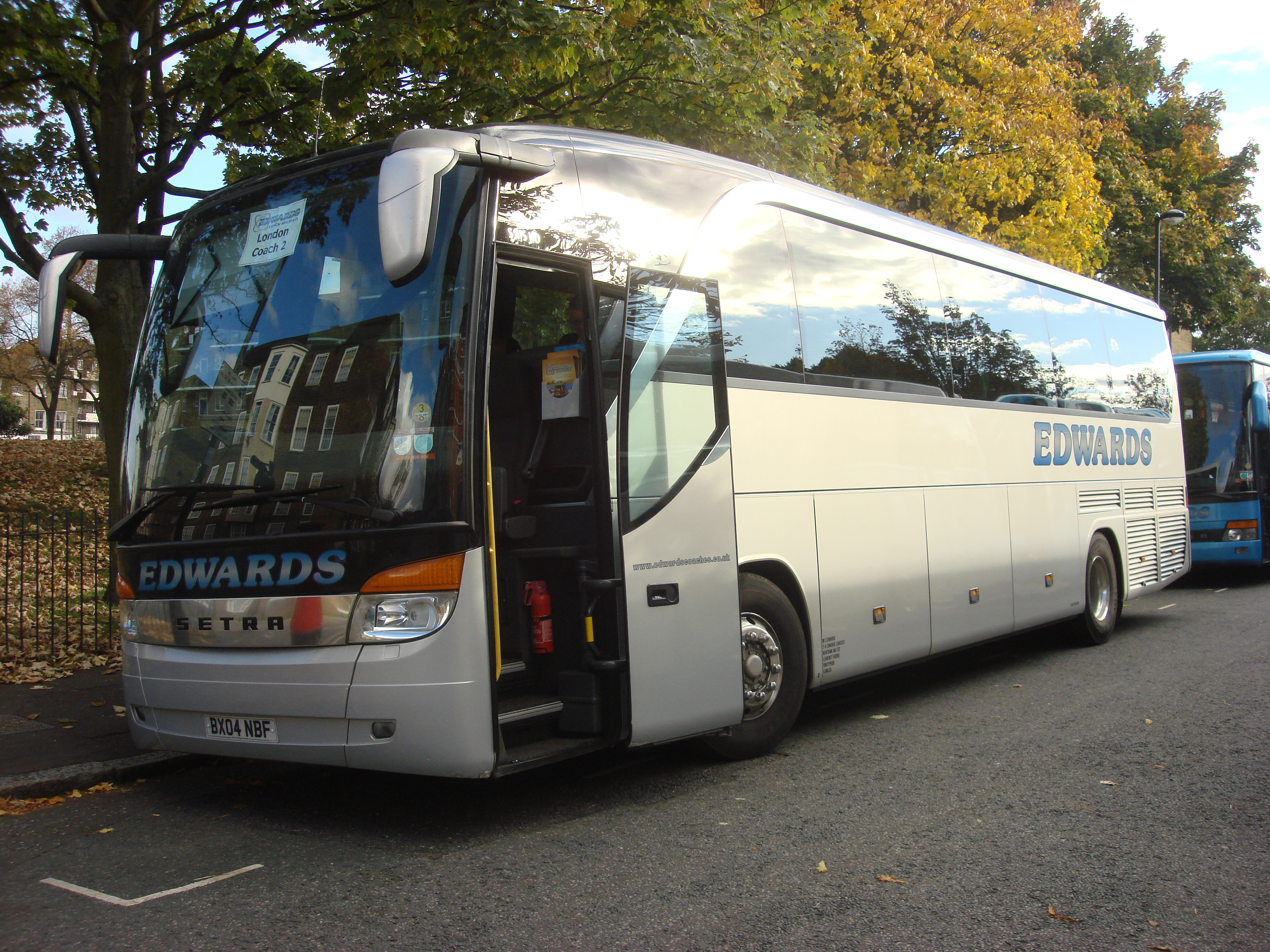
Setra S 415 HD in October 2008

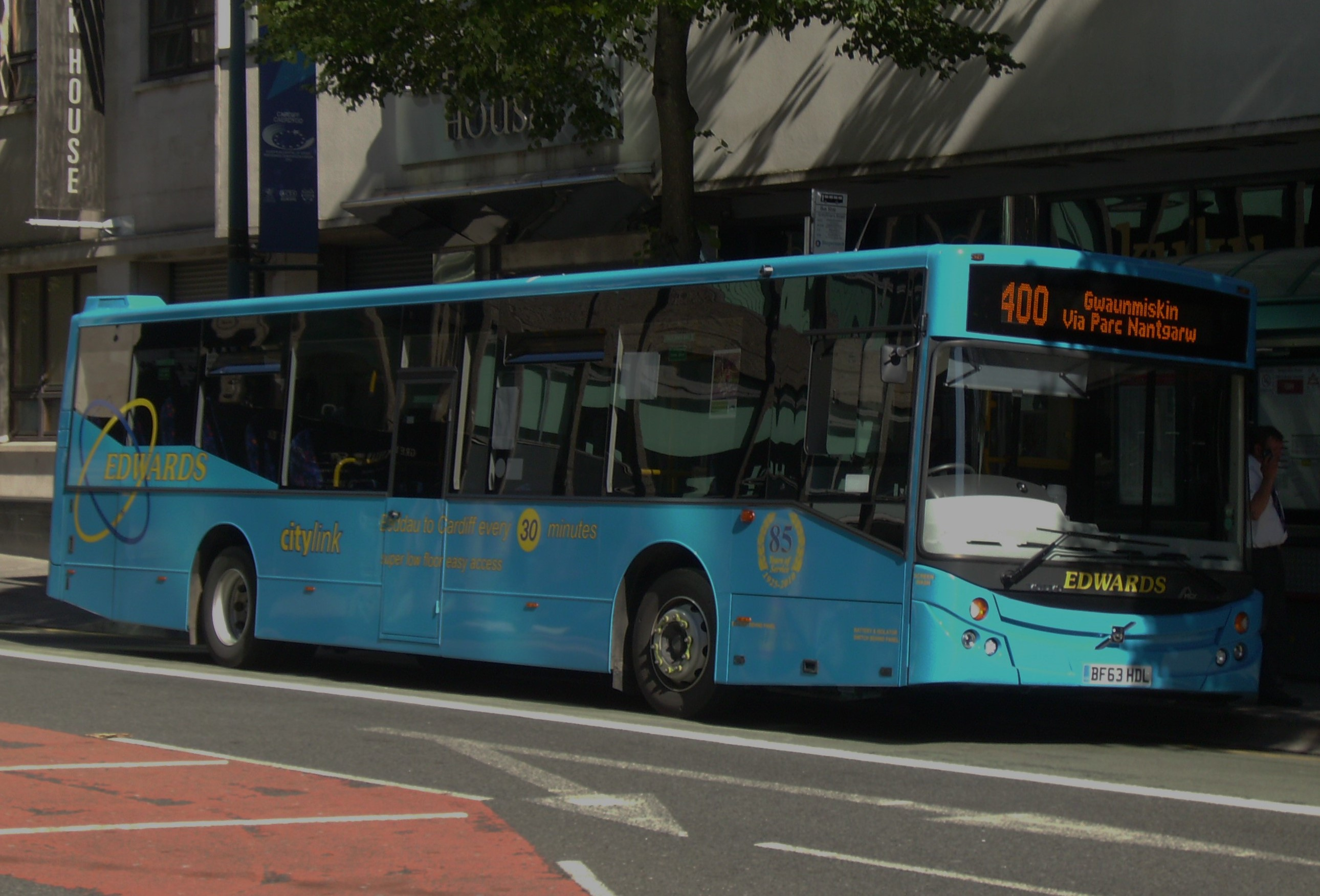
Service 400 (Beddau to Cardiff via Tonteg and A470)

In 1925 Edwards Coaches was founded by George Edwards. Over recent years, the company has expanded by acquiring several smaller local firms. Today, their fleet consists mainly of single decker coaches used for holiday tours and private hire but they also have a number of double-decker buses primarily for school contracts and park and ride services. Edwards Coaches carry around 7,100 students to school every day and around 80,000 customers on holidays each year. A small fleet of service buses is maintained to operate a group of local bus services.

On 7 January 2011, Swansea based coach holiday operator Diamond Coach Holidays went into administration. In the week after Diamond collapsed, Edwards took over £1m in holiday bookings (many of these from ex Diamond customers). On 25 January 2011, after talks with administrators PricewaterhouseCoopers, Edwards Coaches agreed to buy the firm becoming the largest coach holiday operator in Wales In 2016, as Silcox Coaches of Pembroke Dock were going out of business, Edwards took over their school contracts and some of their bus services. The local bus services however did not last long and have since been retendered.

During the 2021 Go North West strike, Edwards Coaches was one of a number of bus operators who provided vehicles and drivers to operate services on behalf of Go North West along with Selwyns Travel and Midland Classic.

== National Express ==
Edwards Coaches are a National Express contractor and as of June 2019 operate services on routes:

- 040 [Bristol]– London Via University West of England, Hammersmith and Earls Court on selected Journeys.
- 040 Whitetree [Durdham Down]- London Victoria Coach Station[London] Via Black Boy Hill- Clifton Down Station- University West of England [Clifton Triangle]- Bristol Bus and Coach Station- Earls Court[University West Of England and Hammersmith on selective journeys]
- 040 London Victoria Coach Station- Weston Super Mare Interchange Via Bristol Bus and Coach Station. [Hammersith on selective journeys]

100 - Bristol Bus Station- Digbeth Coach Station [Digbeth] Via Gloucester Transport Hub and Cheltenham on selected journeys,

100- Bath Bus Station [Bath]- Digbeth Coach Station.[Digbeth] Via Bristol Bus Station & Cheltenham Spa

- 200 Bristol– Heathrow – Gatwick
- 201 Swansea – Cardiff – Newport – Bristol – Heathrow – Gatwick
- 202 Swansea – Cardiff – Newport – Bristol – Heathrow Airport
- 216 Cardiff – Newport – Bristol Airport

401-Swindon Bus Station[Swindon]–London Victoria Coach Station[London]- Queens Drive, Coate Water and Heathrow Central Bus Station.

401-Trowbridge- London Victoria Coach Station via Melksham- Devizes - Wroughton-Swindon Bus Station- Queens Drive [Swindon]- Coate Water[Swindon]- Heathrow Central Bus Station and Earls Court

403-Bath Bus Station [Bath]- London Victoria Coach Station via London Road-Box- Rudloe - Corsham - Chippenham Cepen Park[Sainsburys] and Chippenham the Bridge. Via Heathrow Central Bus Station and Reading Mereoak Park and Ride on selected journeys- Earls Court is also served.

- 502- Barnstaple [Barnstaple]- London Victoria Coach Station.[London] via South Molton-Tiverton- Wellington [Somerset] -Taunton-North Petherton-Bridgwater-Heathrow Central Bus Station & Earls Court [London]

502- Bideford- London Victoria [London] via Yelland- Fremington- Bickington[North Devon]- Barnstaple- South Molton-Tiverton- Wellington[Somerset]- Taunton- North Petherton-Bridgwater- Bristol Bus and Coach Station - Heathrow Central Bus Station and Earls Court [London]

503- Penzance - London Victoria Coach Station[London] via Crowlas- Camborne Cornwall- Newquay- Launceston- Okehampton- Exeter[City Centre]- Exeter [Honiton Road]- Taunton Deane Services and London Earls Court [London]

503- London Victoria Coach Station[London]- Penzance via Heathrow Central Bus Station- Taunton Deane Services- Exeter [Honiton Road]- Exeter [City Centre] Okehampton-Launceston-Newquay-Camborne[Cornwall]& Crowles

- 507 Swansea – Cardiff – London
- 508 Haverfordwest – Pembroke – Carmarthen – Swansea – Cardiff – Reading – London
- 509 Cardiff – Newport – London

From May 2017, Edwards commenced operating more National Express services previously operated by South Gloucestershire Bus & Coach from a new depot in Avonmouth.

From January 2026, Edwards Coaches took over the operation of several National Express services previously operated by Park’s of Hamilton from London & Birmingham to Plymouth & Penzance. These include

101 Birmingham - Bristol - Bridgwater - North Petherton - Taunton - Exeter - Plymouth 3 trips per day in each direction, operated alongside Amans Travel and Travelstar

102 Birmingham - Bristol - Exeter - Newton Abbot - Torquay - Paignton - Plymouth 1 trip per day in each direction

404 London - Heathrow Airport - Weston-super-Mare - Bridgwater - North Petherton - Taunton - Exeter - Newton Abbot - Torquay - Paignton - Totnes - Plymouth - East Taphouse - Lostwithiel - St Blazey - St Austell - Grampound - Tresillian - Truro - Penryn - Falmouth - Helston - Penzance overnight service, 1 trip towards London from Penzance

406 London - Heathrow Airport - Exeter - Plymouth - Landrake - Tideford - Liskeard - Bodmin - Newquay - Redruth - Pool - Camborne - Hayle - St Erth - Crowlas - Penzance overnight service, 1 trip in each direction

501 London - Heathrow Airport - Exeter - Newton Abbot - Torquay - Paignton - Totnes - Plymouth 4 trips per day in each direction

504 London - Plymouth or Penzance 5 trips from London (3 to Penzance, 2 to Plymouth) and 5 trips to London (2 from Plymouth, 3 from Penzance), all with different calling patterns.

== Fleet ==
As at October 2014, the fleet consisted of 225 buses and coaches.
