= Diamond East Midlands =

Bus company from Staffordshire, England

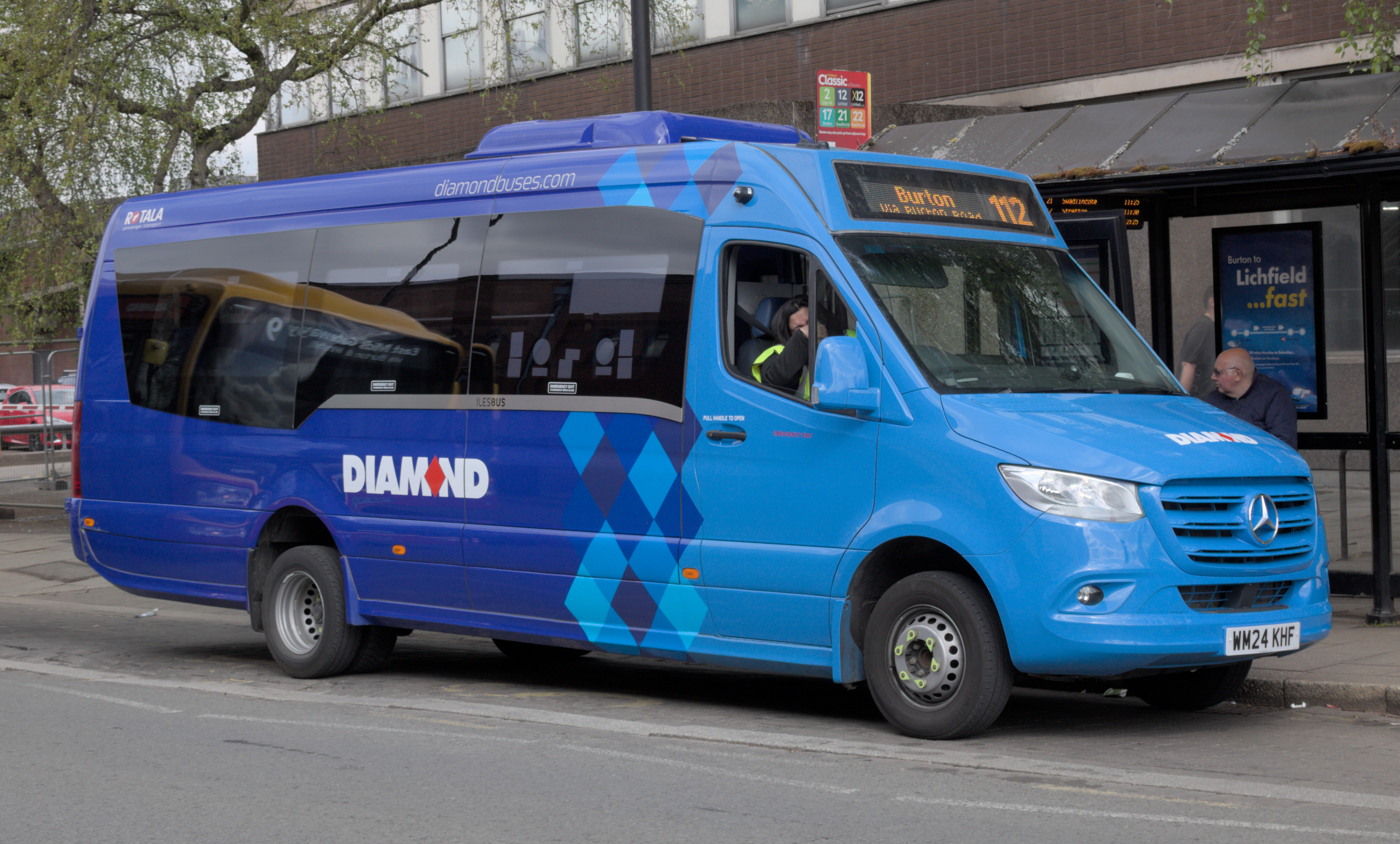
- A Diamond East Midlands Mercedes-Benz Sprinter in Burton upon Trent in April 2025
- Parent: Rotala
- Founded: July 2005 as Midland Classic; August 2022 as Diamond East Midlands
- Headquarters: Tividale
- Service area: East Staffordshire; South Derbyshire; North West Leicestershire
- Service type: Bus services
- Depots: Wetmore Road, Burton upon Trent
- Fleet: 50
- Website: diamondbuses.com

Diamond East Midlands, formerly Midland Classic, is a bus company from Burton upon Trent, Staffordshire, England. Since August 2022, the company is a subsidiary of Rotala.

== History ==
=== Midland Classic ===
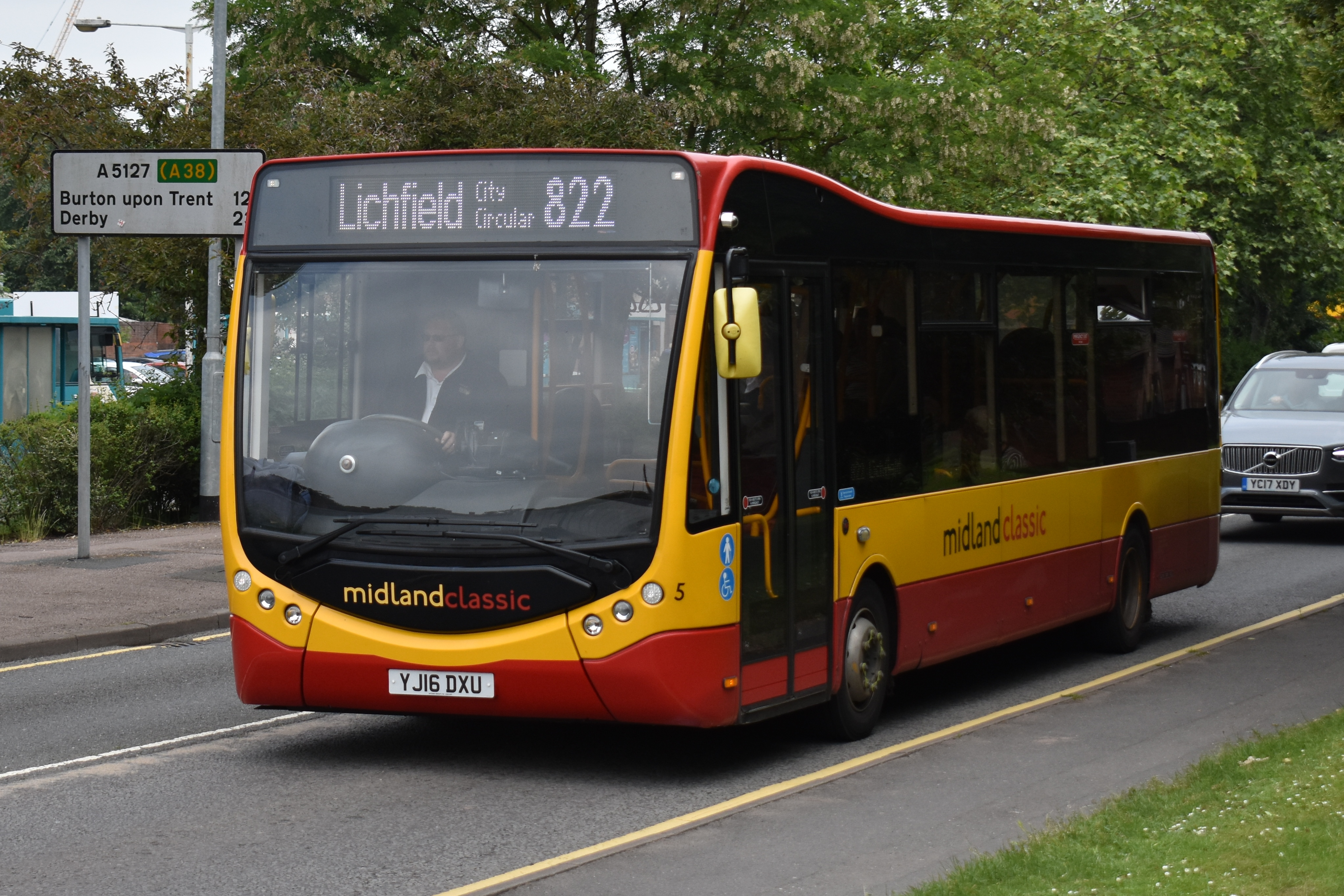
A Midland Classic Optare MetroCity in Lichfield in July 2018

Midland Classic was founded in July 2005 by James Boddice and John Mason with a pair of London Central AEC Routemasters operating charter services. Boddice had a 69% shareholding with D&G Bus proprietor David Reeves, and Julian Peddle each having 13% and John Mitchelson 5%. It later diversified into operating route services.

In April 2016, Midland Classic entered talks with Arriva Midlands to purchase their Burton upon Trent operations based on Wetmore Road within the town. The deal took effect on 27 August 2016 with 30 buses and 80 staff transferring. Midland Classic later moved their operations into the Wetmore Road site with the Stanton Road garage closing.

During the 2021 Go North West strike, Midland Classic were one of a number of bus operators who provided vehicles and drivers to operate services on behalf of Go North West along with Edwards Coaches and Selwyns Travel.

In June 2022, Midland Classic underwent a fares revision which included a joint day-ticket with Select Bus Services and Chaserider.

On 1 August 2022, Midland Classic took over routes 125 and 129, expanding its reach of services out to Leicester, Coalville and Loughborough, these have since been passed to Arriva Midlands upon retendering.

=== Diamond East Midlands ===
Rotala Group acquired Midland Classic on 3 August 2022, for £2 million. The business changed its name to Diamond East Midlands, with buses from other Diamond operations being transferred into the fleet and a repaint programme for pre-existing Midland Classic vehicles beginning. The services and fleet also become directly controlled from the group's headquarters in Tividale in November 2022.

In October 2022, Diamond East Midlands began running contract services for Derbyshire County Council, further extending their reach of services out towards Derby and the surrounding areas.

In June 2023, as part of the Rebranding of operations under Diamond Bus East Midlands the multi-operator day ticket with Select Bus Services and Chaserider ceased to exist. Following this in January 2024, they also withdrew from accepting Staffordshire Knot tickets on the majority of routes, citing its "impact on commercial viability" but returned to the scheme in April 2026 as part of a fare review that saw them withdraw from the government fare cap scheme.

== Services ==
Diamond East Midlands are the main provider of services around Burton upon Trent with services extending to Swadlincote, Ashby-de-la-Zouch, Uttoxeter, Lichfield, Melbourne, East Midlands Airport, Derby, and other surrounding towns and villages.

Services are also operated on behalf of Derbyshire County Council in Derby and the local surrounding areas.
