= 2021 Go North West strike =

Labour strike in Greater Manchester, England

- Date: 28 February 2021 – 18 May 2021 (2 months, 2 weeks and 6 days)
- Location: Greater Manchester, United Kingdom
- Caused by: Disagreements over labour contract between union and company; Union's opposition to the company's alleged "fire and rehire" tactics
- Result: Guarantee from the company against "fire and rehire"; 2 per cent wage increases; One-time £1,500 bonus

Parties
Unite the Union	Go North West

The 2021 Go North West strike was a labour strike involving bus drivers working for Go North West, a bus operator in Greater Manchester, England, that lasted from 28 February to 18 May. The strike involved approximately 500 drivers unionised with Unite the Union and was caused by disagreements over the labour contracts between the company and employees.

Starting in March 2020, Go North West began negotiating new working arrangements with Unite with the goal of cutting costs for their Queens Road bus depot. While the union and company negotiated through 2020, neither side could come to an agreement. In August, Go North West began directly negotiating with drivers one-on-one, with Unite alleging that the company was pushing employees into accepting deals that would lower the workers' salaries. In addition, the union accused the company of firing drivers and then rehiring them under less favourable contracts. Following protests against this in September, the union and company restarted negotiations, and in December, the union made their final offer to the company with an agreement that would have seen approximately £1.2 million in annual savings. However, the company rejected this offer, instead aiming to cut approximately £1.8 million. Negotiations ended in January 2021, after which Unite began to prepare for possible industrial action against the company. On 9 February, drivers voted in favour of striking, which began on 28 February.

From the beginning of the strike, the drivers had support from numerous local activist and trade union groups, such as the Manchester Trades Union Council and the People's Assembly. Discussions between the union and company were held in late March, but ended without an agreement, and the strike continued for several more weeks. During this time, Unite also headed a leverage campaign against the Go-Ahead Group (Go North West's parent company), targeting shareholders of the group and soliciting support from several national and international trade union groups. By early May, following several days of discussions between Unite and Go North West, the two came to a formal agreement that was subsequently put to a vote amongst union members. Among the provisions of the deal, the company agreed not to employ any "fire and rehire" practices, with additional provisions including a wage increase and protections to sick pay. Strikers voted to accept the deal on 17 May, with the strike ending the next day. In total, the strike lasted almost two and a half months, making it the longest strike in Unite history and one of the longest strikes in British transportation history.

== Background ==
=== Go North West ===
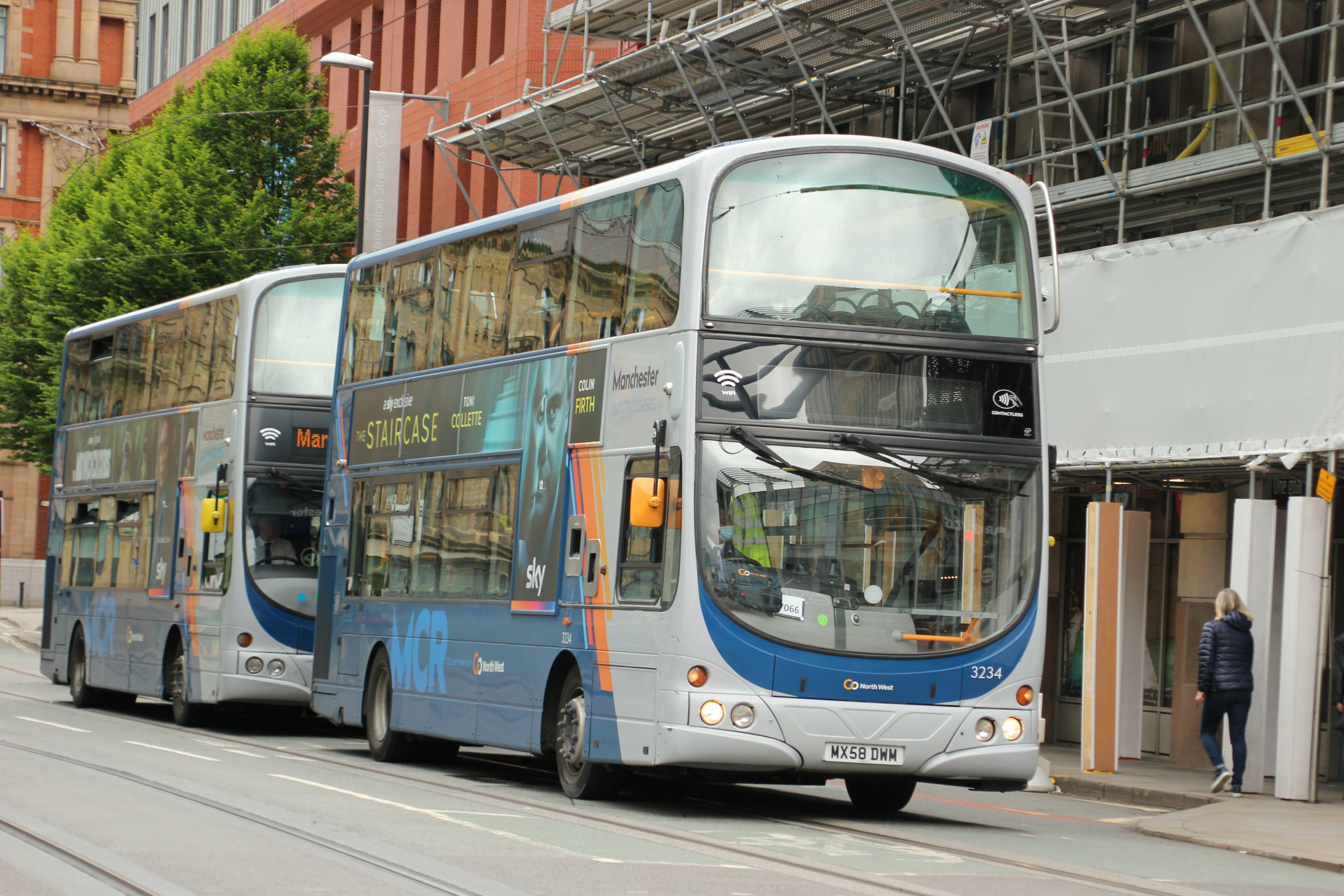
Go North West buses on Corporation Street, Manchester, in 2022

In early 2019, First Greater Manchester, a bus company subsidiary of British transportation group FirstGroup, announced their intent to sell their Queens Road bus depot in Cheetham, Manchester, to the Go-Ahead Group, which would operate the depot under its new subsidiary Go North West. At the time, Go-Ahead was one of the largest transportation groups in the United Kingdom and the largest bus operator in London, with additional bus operations throughout England. The acquisition of the Queens Road depot marked the company's first entry into Manchester. As part of the £11.17 million purchase, Go-Ahead also took ownership of the 163 vehicles that were operating out of the depot, with former FirstGroup employees at Queens Road retained as Go-Ahead employees.

=== Hostilities between union and company ===
On 11 August 2020, Unite the Union, the trade union representing workers at the depot, claimed that Go North West had a "bullying culture" and that management was attempting to push a wage reduction of £2,000 per year onto about 500 bus drivers. (Note: A later article in the Manchester Evening News published on 11 September 2020 has union representatives claiming that the average driver would lose approximately £3,500 per year. That same article gives an exact number of drivers as 485.) According to the union, management was offering drivers a £5,000 single-time bonus to alter their employment contracts with stipulations that would have included the wage decrease. In addition, Unite stated that the new agreements contained changes to both sick leave and workhours. The union referred to the move by management as "an odious sleight of hand" and also alleged that management was using the COVID-19 pandemic as a "smokescreen" for their actions. At the time, union representatives stated that they were going to look into possible actions, including a consultative ballot for industrial action at the depot. Unite also claimed that Go North West was attempting to make these changes while 80 per cent of the drivers, including all but one of their union representatives, were on furlough. In an article published by local independent media newspaper The Meteor that same month, a representative for Go North West stated that the company had been trying to negotiate new working arrangements with Unite since March 2020, further stating, "These changes are long overdue, are necessary to enable the company to regain profitability, and would bring the depot into line with commonly accepted working practices elsewhere in the bus sector." The company further stated that the changed would keep all current driving jobs at the station and not result in any changes to take home pay or weekly hours worked.

According to Unite, the company gave a deadline of 12 August for accepting the terms of the new employment agreements. However, after labour negotiations between management and union representatives broke down that day, the union began making preparations for the consultative ballot. Following this, Unite accused Go North West of suspending the senior union representative at Queens Road (the chair of that union branch and the only representative who was not currently furloughed) for conducting union activities, with a Unite official later stating that the "allegation against the Unite senior rep was totally without merit and his suspension was an attempt to undermine Unite from representing the legitimate interests of its members". Go North West countered that the representative had been suspended due to a serious complaint lodged by a bus driver against him. Following the suspension, Unite announced that the consultative ballot would be held by the end of the month. On 14 August, Go North West sent Unite a Section 188 notice, which would allow the company to end drivers' contracts and renegotiate new terms, which the union criticized as a "fire and rehire" scenario. While the union criticized the company for attempting to cut wages while having made millions in profits the previous year, a company representative stated, "The alternatives entail making redundancies, cuts to services and having unhappy employees on our hands ... Without these changes, the Go North West business and its operation of bus services from Queen's Road depot, is not viable and ultimately, the business will have to close." Results from the consultative ballot showed that 94 per cent of respondents were in favour of taking industrial action against Go North West.

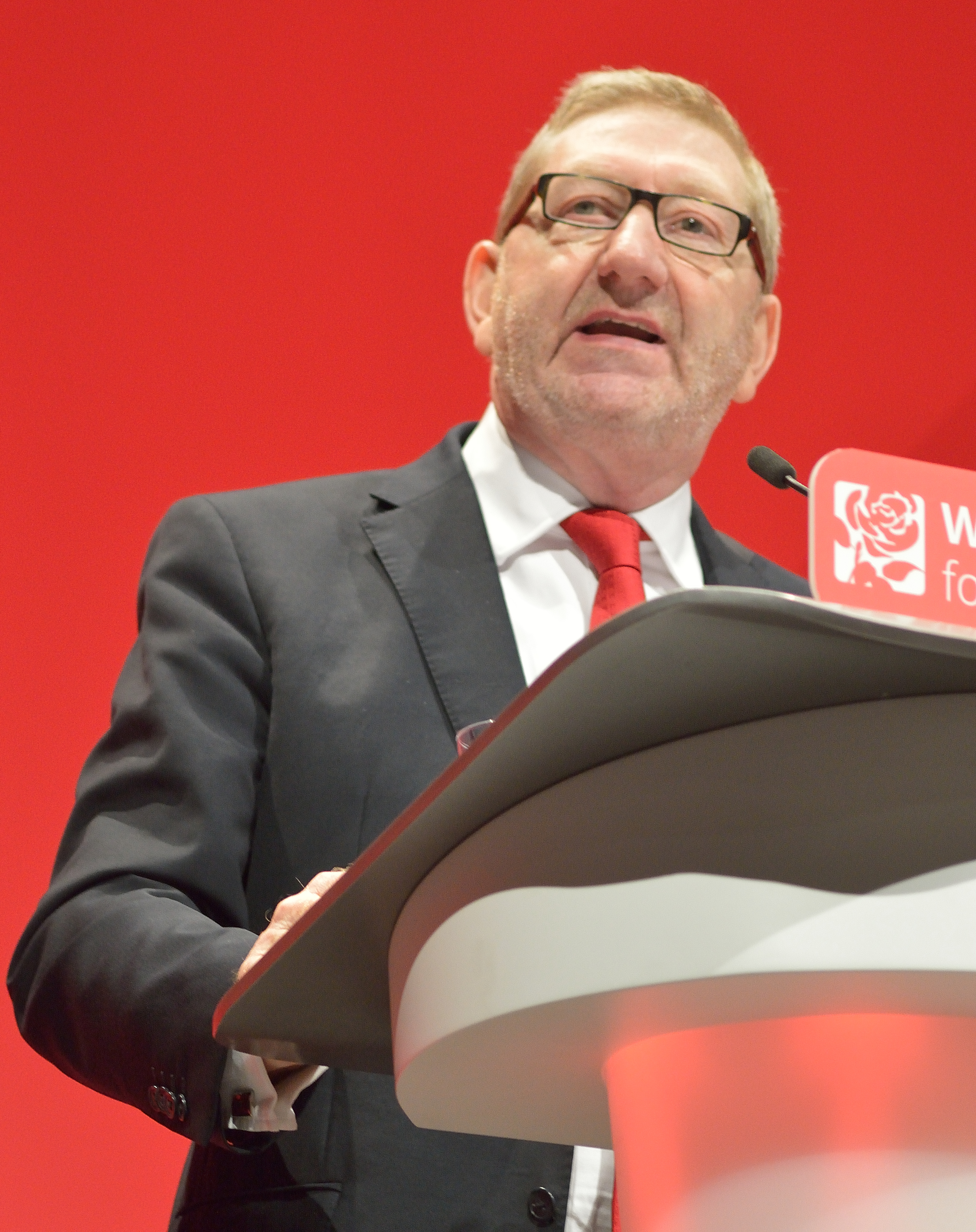
Len McCluskey, General Secretary for Unite the Union during the labour dispute

On 9 September, protestors outside the Queens Road depot caused a disruption in bus services, and additional protesting followed the next day, with police called on the protestors on both days. According to the Manchester Evening News, the protestors were not organized by trade unions, but were local activists displaying solidarity with Unite the Union. (Note: This claim is somewhat contradicted by a 14 September article in The Meteor that claims that the protests involved members of Unite the Union and the Manchester Trades Union Council. An 11 September article in the student newspaper The Mancunion stated that the protestors were from various left-wing groups and had organized themselves as a group called the Manchester Public Transport Users' Association.) Following the second day of protests, Greater Manchester Mayor Andy Burnham indicated that he would intervene. On 11 September, about 20 activists from various local left-wing groups were able to block buses from leaving the depot. While these protests were occurring, Unite the Union General Secretary Len McCluskey sent a letter to Go-Ahead Group CEO David Brown stating that industrial action was likely if negotiations did not continue and the Section 188 notice was withdrawn. Following this, on 24 September, Go North West and Unite entered into negotiations. Negotiations between the union and the company lasted for several months until on 21 December, Unite submitted a "final offer" to the company that would have included a £1 million in cost reductions and a one-year pay freeze that would have amounted to £200,000 in savings. However, Go North West rejected these terms as not substantial enough. By comparison, Go North West had been aiming to cut £1.8 million in company costs. On 12 January 2021, the union contacted Go North West's parent company to request that they support talks between Go North West and Unite. However, on 16 January, Go North West officially ended their negotiations with Unite. In total, over 38 meetings were held between the company and the union between March 2020 and January 2021.

=== Union members vote to strike ===
Following the end of negotiations, Go North West began to directly consult with drivers, with the union alleging that the company was illegally requiring drivers to attend these consultations without union representation. With Go North West's withdrawal from negotiations, Unite began preparing another consultative ballot for industrial action. The vote on whether or not to perform strike action was expected to be finalized by 9 February. By that time, a report from Unite indicated that the vote had a 77 per cent turnout with 82 per cent voting in favor of strike action. In a response, Go North West defended their consultations with employees and stated that over 80 per cent of the drivers had voluntarily signed the new contracts. The union later announced that a strike would commence on 28 February. On the day the strike was set to begin, Unite wrote to Mayor Burnham requesting him to become involved after they discovered that buses that were to be used during the strike did not have shields to protect the drivers from COVID-19 exposure.

== Course of the strike ==
=== Early strike activities ===
The strike commenced on 28 February, with approximately 400 drivers performing a walkout. All of Go North West's 16 bus routes in the Greater Manchester area were affected, but soon after the start of the strike, the company stated that they were operating at full service by sub-contracting to smaller bus operators. Additionally, they claimed that about 100 drivers had crossed the picket line and returned to work. Unite criticized Go North West's use of non-union drivers and operators and labeled the company a "rogue bus service". The Manchester strike coincided with an unrelated strike by Unite-affiliated bus drivers in Greater London working for several subsidiaries of the RATP Group.

On 2 March, the Manchester Evening News reported that numerous politicians from the Labour Party were in support of the strike, including Afzal Khan and Rebecca Long-Bailey, Members of Parliament from Manchester Gorton and Salford and Eccles, respectively. Additionally, the Manchester Trades Union Council voiced their support for the strikers. Also on 2 March, Mayor Burnham, after speaking to both union and company, announced that he was facilitating a process where the two could enter into non-binding arbitration through Acas, a conciliation service. By 5 March, a company representative stated that they had attended meetings with Acas and that they were willing to open discussions with the union. That same day, in an article from The Bolton News, the union accused Go North West of violating health and safety standards regarding COVID-19 protection by operating their buses at higher capacities than pandemic restrictions would allow. In response, a company representative stated that "Covid-19 compliance is an absolute priority" for the company. In early March, Unite members from the Rolls-Royce facility in Barnoldswick, who had recently been involved in a strike of their own, joined with drivers to picket in solidarity outside the Queens Road depot. They also donated £500 to the drivers' strike fund. On the same day, Peter Clifford, the Communist League's candidate in the 2021 Greater Manchester mayoral election, visited the picket line.

=== Discussions break down and strike continues ===
On 1 April, following 12 days of negotiations between the union and company facilitated by Acas, neither side could come to an agreement that would have ended the strike, and as a result, negotiations were halted. During the discussions, Unite proposed changes that would have saved £1.3 million in expenses per year, but Go North West deemed these savings too small. Also during the discussions, Unite charged that Go North West was threatening to shut down the Queens Road depot if the union did not accept the company's cost-cutting. Go North West countered that Unite was making "wild claims [that] bear no resemblance whatsoever to the facts" and claimed that a third of the drivers had already crossed the picket line and returned to work. On 7 April, Mayor Burnham visited the picket line and criticized the company "fire and rehire" tactics, stating, "We will not allow franchising of our buses to be a race to the bottom when it comes to people's terms and conditions". Meanwhile, in mid-April, Unite called on London Mayor Sadiq Khan to outlaw "fire and rehire" contracts in the city's bus operating services in order to prevent similar labour issues to what was happening in Manchester.

On 17 April, picketing drivers were joined by over 100 members of other community groups, such as the National Education Union, in a show of support for the strike. The following day, The Guardian published an article that discussed Go-Ahead as one of many companies accused of using "fire and rehire" practices during the course of the COVID-19 pandemic, along with British Gas, University Hospitals Birmingham NHS Foundation Trust, and Compass Group-subsidiary ESS, among others. The article also contained a statement from Frances O'Grady, the General Secretary of the Trades Union Congress, who said that almost one of every ten British workers had been affected by "fire and rehire" practices during the pandemic. On 20 April, BBC News published an article discussing how Go North West had logged 38 separate incidents of strikers intimidating, assaulting, and attacking non-striking employees since the start of the strike. Unite denied these incidents, stating they had no record of strikers being involved in any such incidents and that the union would take action against any striker who was found to have been involved.

On 3 May, the striking drivers led the May Day march in Manchester, which ran from Piccadilly Gardens to the picket line at the depot. At an earlier May Day rally, a representative of Unite said in a speech that the union was conducting a "leverage operation" (also referred to as a "leverage campaign") that targeted the Go-Ahead Group's operations throughout the United Kingdom. In addition to pushing for the mayors of London and Manchester to outlaw "fire and rehire", this leverage operation also targeted shareholders and people who held a financial stake in the Go-Ahead Group. On an international level, Unite garnered support from several trade unions and reached out to politicians and unions in places such as Germany and Sweden, where the Go-Ahead Group was trying to expand its operations. According to a Unite official, the union's communications with Members of Swedish Parliament (where "fire and rehire" is illegal) led to that country reconsidering a proposed railway contract with Go-Ahead.

=== End of the strike ===
By early May, the union and company had come to a tentative agreement that would have seen an end to the strike. The deal, as reported in the Manchester Evening News on 6 May, would have seen improvements to sick pay and a new collective agreement between Unite and Go North West. In addition, Go North West agreed to not employ any "fire and rehire" practices. The agreement followed what a Go North West representative described as "an intensive summit meeting" in London that had lasted two days, from 26 to 27 April, and had been attended by Unite General Secretary McCluskey and Go-Ahead CEO Brown. While a formal agreement between the two groups had been reached, Unite representatives clarified that "[a] deal is still to be finalised and therefore no ballot of members has been arranged". On 17 May, a vote was held among union members on whether or not to accept the agreement and end the strike. After the proposed agreement was reviewed by the strike committee and put to vote, approximately 83.5 per cent voted in favor accepting the deal. The following day marked the last day of the strike, and at noon on 18 May, union officials met with management to organize the strikers' return to work.

=== Bus Operators covering during the strike ===
During the industrial action, Go North West contracted with a number of bus operators to cover services, with the Manchester free bus being operated completely by Go North West, Service 100 being operated by The Travellers Choice and Edwards Coaches, Service 17 and 18 being covered by operators such as Selwyns Travel, Red Routemaster and Tyrers Coaches, services 97/98 to Bury being covered by operators such as Midland Classic, York Pullman and Connexionsbuses as well as Selywns Travel and operators such as Orion Travel and MP Travel operating services 41 and 135.

== Aftermath ==
Among the provisions of the deal, Go North West guaranteed not to use any "fire and rehire" practices. Additionally, sick pay was reduced, but kept in place, while the workers would receive a 2 per cent annual pay raise for both 2021 and 2022, in addition to a one-time £1,500 payment. Seniority with respect to scheduling was also reinstated, as this had been an issue early on in contract negotiations where some employees were being given more favorable shifts than employees who had worked there longer. The strike was generally seen as a success for the union. In an interview with The Meteor, several drivers expressed satisfaction at the results of the strike, especially the guarantee against "fire and rehire". One driver said, "It was never about money. It was about fire and rehire. We were on strike for terms and conditions. I think the general public understood that." Speaking to The Militant, one former striker stated that the strike "was most definitely an achievement".

Lasting over two months, the strike was the longest in the history of Unite the Union. According to a representative for the Manchester Trades Union Council, it was the longest bus strike in British history, while the magazine Tribune called it "the longest in recent history for the entire passenger transport sector".

== See also ==
- Strikes during the COVID-19 pandemic
