= 2007 M1 motorway coach accident =

Motor vehicle incident in England

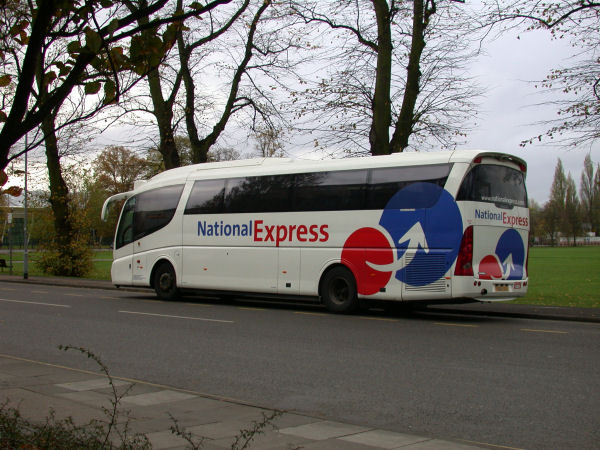
A National Express Coach of the same model as the one involved in the crash

On 3 September 2007, a National Express single-decker coach, travelling southbound on the M1 motorway was involved in a crash. It was operating the 777 service from Birmingham to London Stansted Airport, via London Luton Airport, and had recently stopped at Coventry. There were 33 passengers on board at the time of the accident, of whom 30 were injured, six seriously.

== Crash and emergency response ==
The coach rolled on to its side after it clipped a kerb and then a lamp post and tree at the entry to a motorway slip road by the Newport Pagnell services area on the southbound M1 motorway. It was ultimately confirmed that the coach driver mistook the entry to the service area for a major junction on the M1.

The injured were taken to hospitals in Milton Keynes, Northampton and the John Radcliffe Hospital in Oxford. One of the injured was transported to hospital by air ambulance.

The driver of the coach was arrested by Thames Valley Police in hospital on suspicion of driving under the influence of alcohol and dangerous driving after being cut free from the wreckage. He had earlier been breath tested at the scene of the collision.

== Aftermath ==
National Express decided not to withdraw the fleet of coaches to conduct tests. It was deemed that there were no faults with the vehicles, leaving the cause of the crash to driver error.

The Chief Executive, Richard Bowker, defended the company's safety record on the Today programme, stating that drivers faced stringent tests both during the recruitment process and during their employment. He confirmed that National Express were fully co-operating with the police investigation, and insisted that it was extremely rare for National Express to have an accident like this,

== The coach driver ==
Two days after the crash, police were still waiting to question the coach driver. The driver had sustained serious injuries, including an injured arm and cracked ribs, and was being treated at Northampton General Hospital. Police officers had to guard the driver in hospital until he was declared fit to answer police questions. The police confirmed that the slip road where the coach crashed needed to be re-surfaced due to damage caused by a diesel spill. The coach driver was released from hospital on 10 September, and was also released on police bail, to attend Milton Keynes police station on 1 October for further questioning.

On 23 November 2007, police announced they had yet to decide whether to charge the driver. The police explained that, due to delays in receiving forensic evidence, the Crown Prosecution Service was unable to make a fully informed decision on whether to bring charges. The 35-year-old driver from West Bromwich, who had still not been named, was further bailed until 28 January 2008.

On 28 January 2008, the National Express coach driver, now identified as Leslie Weinberg, 36, was officially charged with driving under the influence of excess alcohol, and a further charge of dangerous driving. He was due to appear on 12 February 2008 at Milton Keynes Magistrates' Court to answer the charges. Weinburg's actions left eight people needing hospital treatment for their injuries. Weinberg was subsequently dismissed by National Express as a result of the charge.

On 14 April 2008, Weinberg's actions were finally made public, via full evidence in court. Appearing before Judge Christopher Tyrer at Aylesbury Crown Court, Weinberg pleaded guilty to the two charges. The Court was told that Weinberg had a drink-drive reading of 145 milligrams (0.0051 oz) of alcohol in 100 millilitres (3.520 imp fl oz; 3.381 US fl oz) of blood – the UK legal limit is 80 milligrams (0.0028 oz) per 100 ml. Six passengers suffered serious injuries as a direct result of Weinberg's actions; one man had an arm amputated. The Judge warned Weinburg to expect a jail sentence, and stated: "This is serious. The circumstances are very grave". The Judge continued: "As a result of your intoxication, you completely mistook where you were. You mistook the exit of the motorway and a number of people were seriously injured". The case was adjourned to seek medical reports on Wienburg, to re-appear during the week of 26 May 2008 for sentencing. Judge Christopher Tyrer imposed an Interim Disqualification Order which banned Weinberg from driving, and told him: "This is way past the custody threshold, and you should make arrangements accordingly".

Weinberg was sentenced on 24 June 2008. On re-appearing at Aylesbury Crown Court, it became known that Weinberg had returned from holiday the day before, and chose to stay up alone all night drinking. The court was told that the following day Weinburg drove a National Express coach on a regular service from Birmingham to Stansted Airport. While travelling southbound on the M1, Weinberg overtook a lorry on the approach to a motorway junction. He then cut back in front of the lorry, and claimed to have mistaken the service station entry slip road for that of the actual junction exit slip road. As the coach entered the slip road, its tachograph showed that the coach was travelling at 57 miles per hour (92 km/h). It then hit a kerb, and passengers reported the coach 'took off'. It then rolled on to its side, sliding into a lamp-post and a tree.

Leslie Weinberg was jailed for ten months and fined £500. He was disqualified from driving for four years for the guilty plea of driving with excess alcohol, and had a further concurrent two-year disqualification for the guilty plea of dangerous driving.
