= Selwyns Travel =

Coach operator based in Runcorn, England

Selwyns Travel Ltd

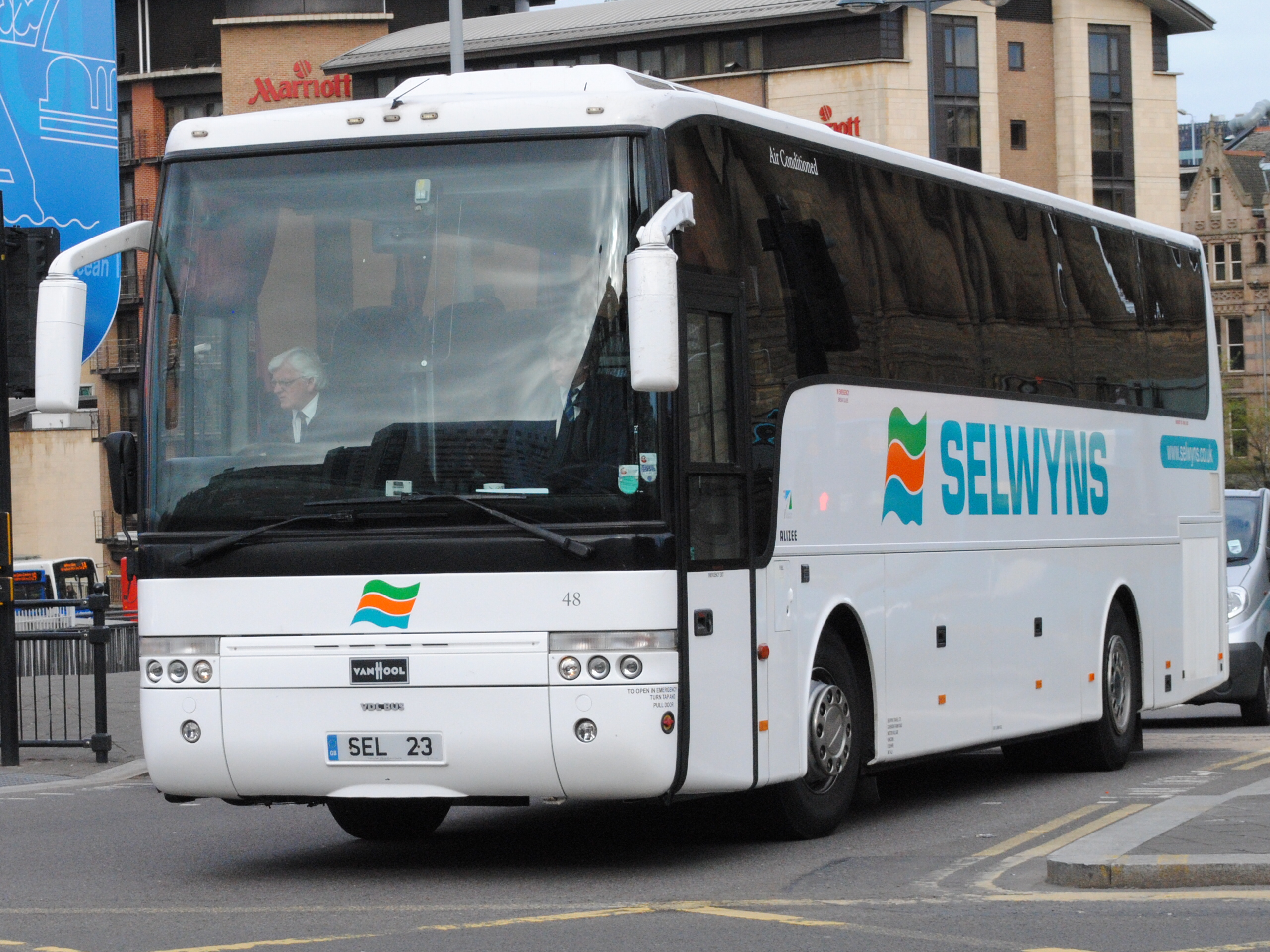
- Van Hool bodied VDL DE4000 in Liverpool in April 2013
- Founded: 1968; 58 years ago
- Headquarters: Runcorn, Cheshire, England
- Service type: Coach operator
- Depots: 2 and 1 outstation
- Fleet: 90
- Website: selwyns.co.uk

Selwyns Travel is a coach/bus operator and Mobico Group partner operator based in Runcorn, Cheshire, England.

== History ==
Selwyns Travel was founded in 1968 by Father and Son Robert and Selwyn Jones. It grew rapidly from a one minibus operation to enable the purchase of Yates Tours Ltd Runcorn in 1979, the Manchester Airport division of Ambassador Coaches t/a Starline Travel in 1994 (Note: Starline Travel was sold to British Bus t/a North Western Road Car Co. Ambassador Coaches was a joint venture between Bullocks Coaches and Starline which traded as Starline Travel. The airport division of Ambassador Coaches was separated from the Cheshire division, with the airport division being sold to Selwyns and the Cheshire division remaining with Bullocks.), Hardings Tours, Liverpool in 1996 and Haytons, Manchester in 2011.

In March 2013, the business was sold to the RATP Group with a fleet of 90 vehicles operating from depots in Runcorn, Manchester and St Helens.

In April 2020 RATP returned control back to Selwyn Jones through his newly incorporated private company, Selwyns Coaches Limited which became the major shareholder of Selwyns Travel Limited.

in April 2026, Selwyns Travel centralised all their operations by moving the National Express services into the Sharston depot as an entirety, leaving just private hire, contracts and school services running from the Runcorn Head Office

== Operations ==
Selwyns operate from two depots in Runcorn and Sharston, as well as from a National Express outstation at Milton Keynes Coachway. A National Express outstation was also maintained at Leeds City bus station until its closure on 17 May 2024.

Their head office depot in Runcorn covers private bookings, various contracts and school/college services including Sir John Deane's College and Reaseheath College.. Selwyns' Sharston depot is responsible for the operator's airside crew transfer operations at Manchester Airport, also the National Express routes operate from this depot.

During the 2021 Go North West strike, Selwyns Travel was one of a number of bus operators who provided vehicles and drivers to operate services on behalf of Go North West along with Edwards Coaches and Midland Classic.
