= National Express =

Highway coach operator in Great Britain

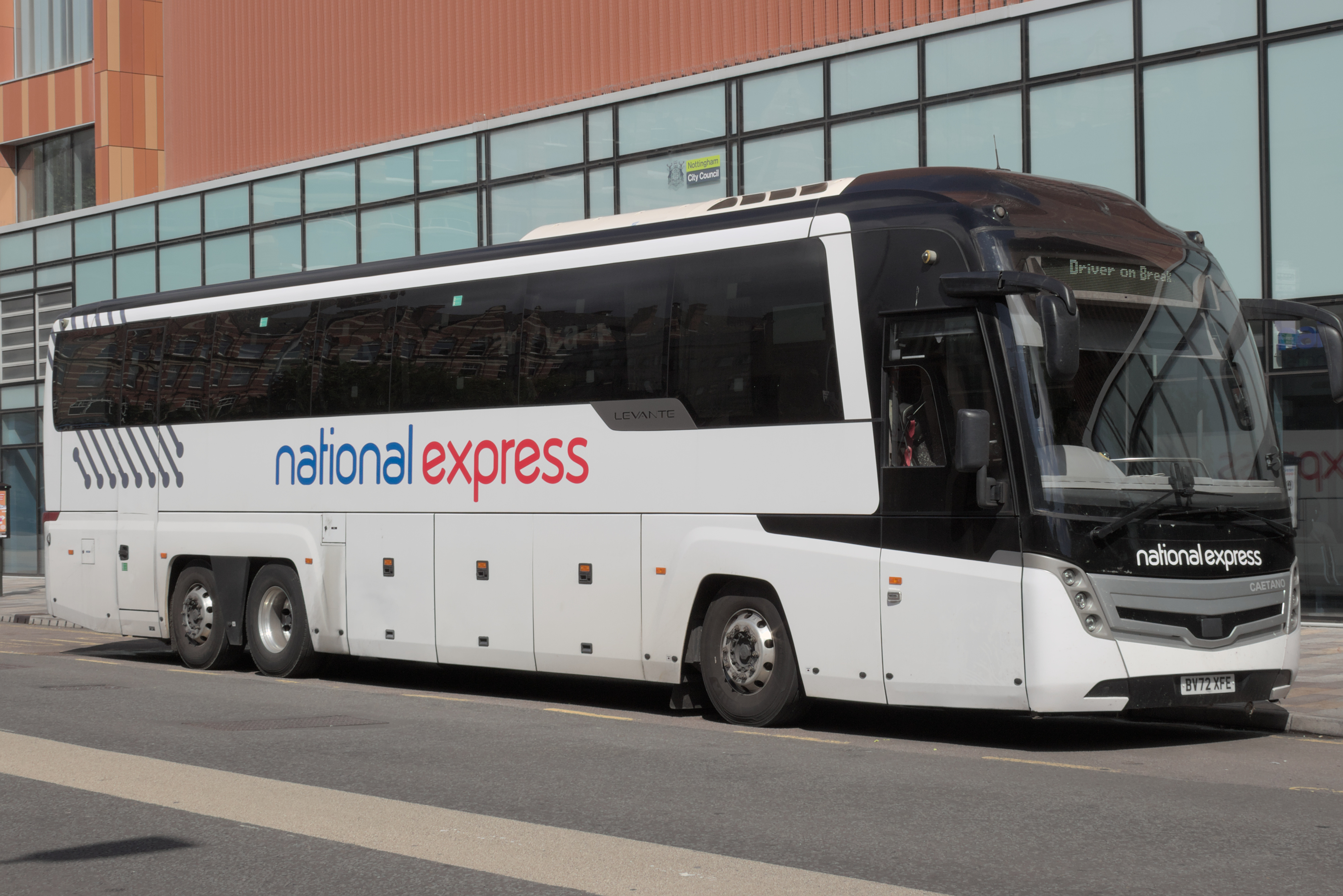
- National Express coach in Nottingham in July 2025
- Parent: Mobico Group
- Founded: 4 December 1972; 53 years ago
- Headquarters: Birmingham Coach Station
- Service area: Great Britain
- Service type: Highway long and medium-distance intercity coach network
- Hubs: Birmingham; London; Manchester; Stansted Airport; Heathrow Airport; Southampton; Bristol; Leeds
- Website: www.nationalexpress.com/en

National Express, also abbreviated NX, is a long and medium-distance intercity coach operator operating services throughout Great Britain. It is a subsidiary of the British multinational public transport company Mobico Group. Most services are subcontracted to local coach companies. The company's head office is in offices above Birmingham Coach Station.

== History ==
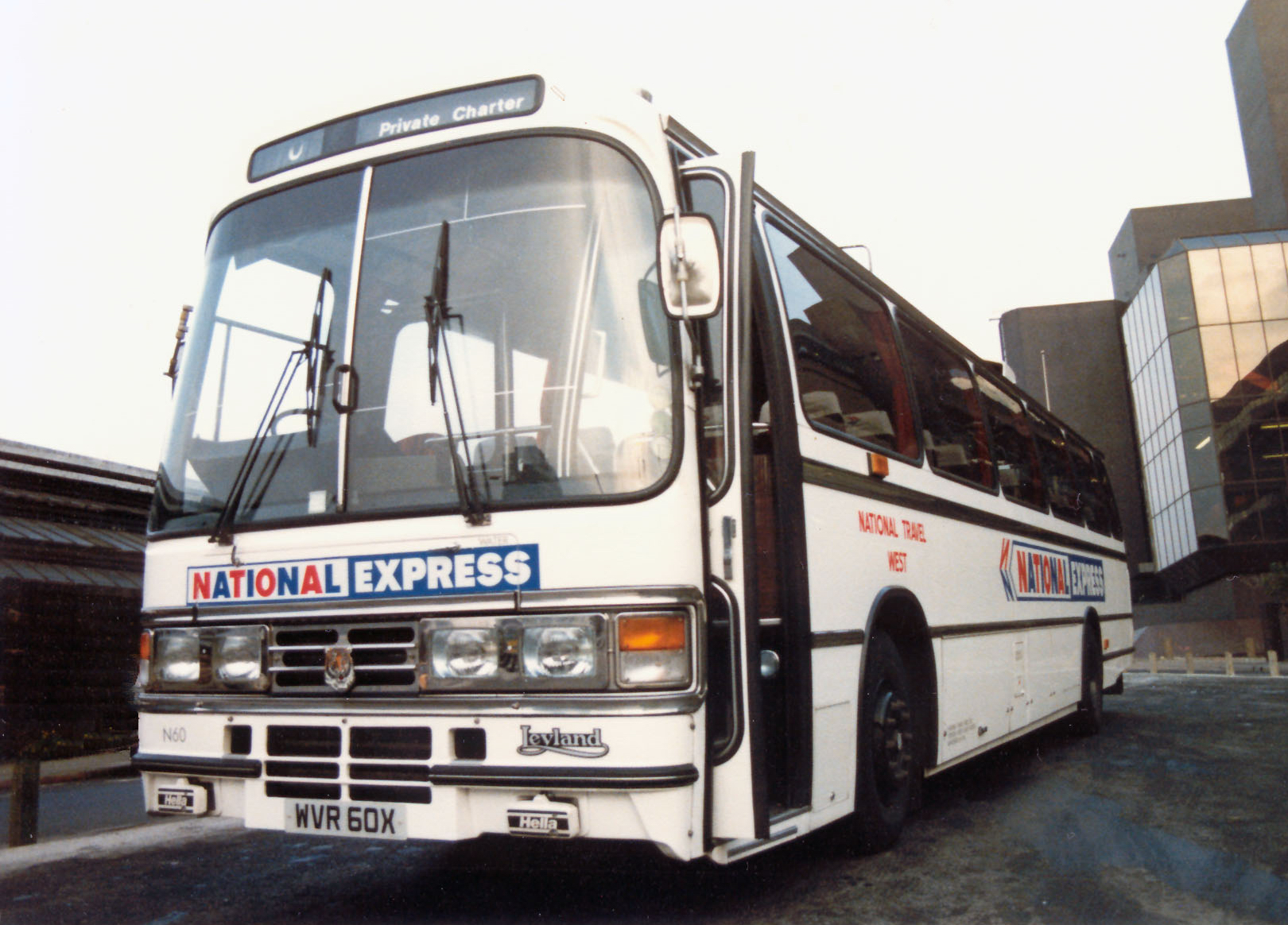
Duple Dominant bodied Leyland Tiger in Liverpool in 1982 in the original livery

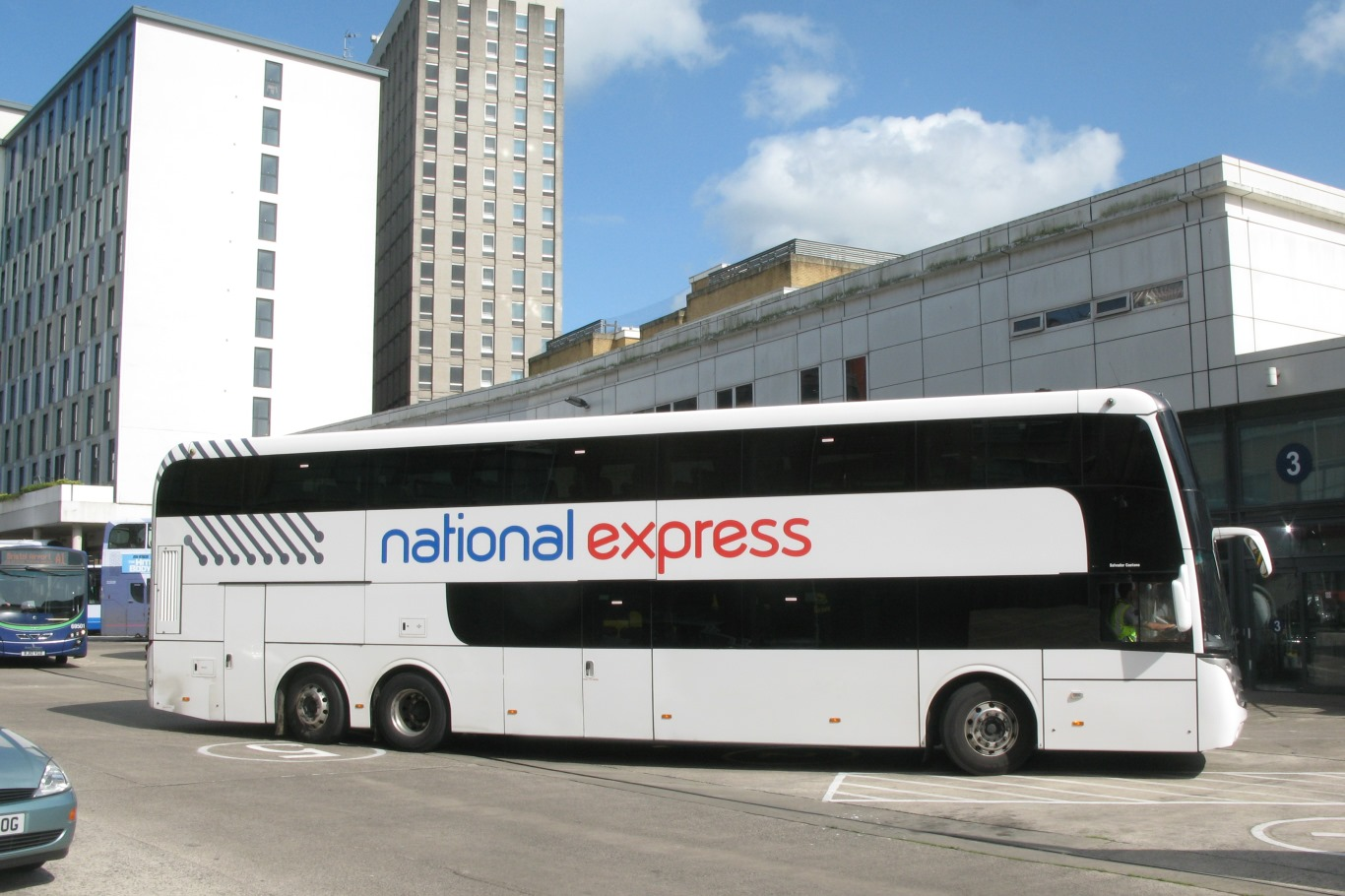
Edwards Coaches Caetano Boa Vista at Bristol bus station

Pursuant to the Transport Act 1968, the National Bus Company (NBC) was formed as a holding company for the many state-owned local bus companies. Many of these companies also operated coach services, which were brought together for marketing purposes under the National brand, developed by NBC chair Frederick Wood and design consultant Norman Wilson. The National Express brand was first used in 1974 and gradually became the main brand name for the coach business, although the coach services continued to be operated by the individual companies.

Coach services were deregulated under the Transport Act 1980, and buses by the Transport Act 1985. In March 1988 National Express was privatised in a management buyout. In July 1989, the company bought ATL Holdings (with operations in Sheffield) and a 50% share in Yelloway Trathen, which was renamed Trathens Travel Services.

In August 1989, the Eurolines services from London to Alicante, Barcelona and Paris were purchased from the tour operator Wallace Arnold, and the express services (with 29 coaches) in Scotland and to London from Stagecoach. These were operated under the Caledonian Express brand.

In June 1991, National Express was sold to the Drawlane Group. In December 1992, National Express Group plc was floated on the London Stock Exchange.

In its early years, National Express had little competition in the long-distance coach market. A number of operators attempted to compete with the company after deregulation in 1980, the largest being the British Coachways consortium, but most had ceased to compete by the end of the decade. However, in 2003, Stagecoach introduced Megabus, a no-frills service whose £1 fares sparked a price war with National Express in autumn 2004. Competition intensified in 2007 when Megabus transferred its London terminus from the Green Line Coach Station into the main Victoria Coach Station.

== Operations ==
A national network links more than 550 routes, including many of the UK mainland's cities, with 11,000 cross-country journeys every week as of 2022.

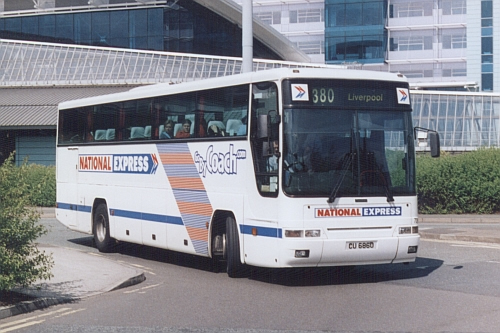
Plaxton Premiere bodied Volvo B10M at Manchester Airport in April 2003

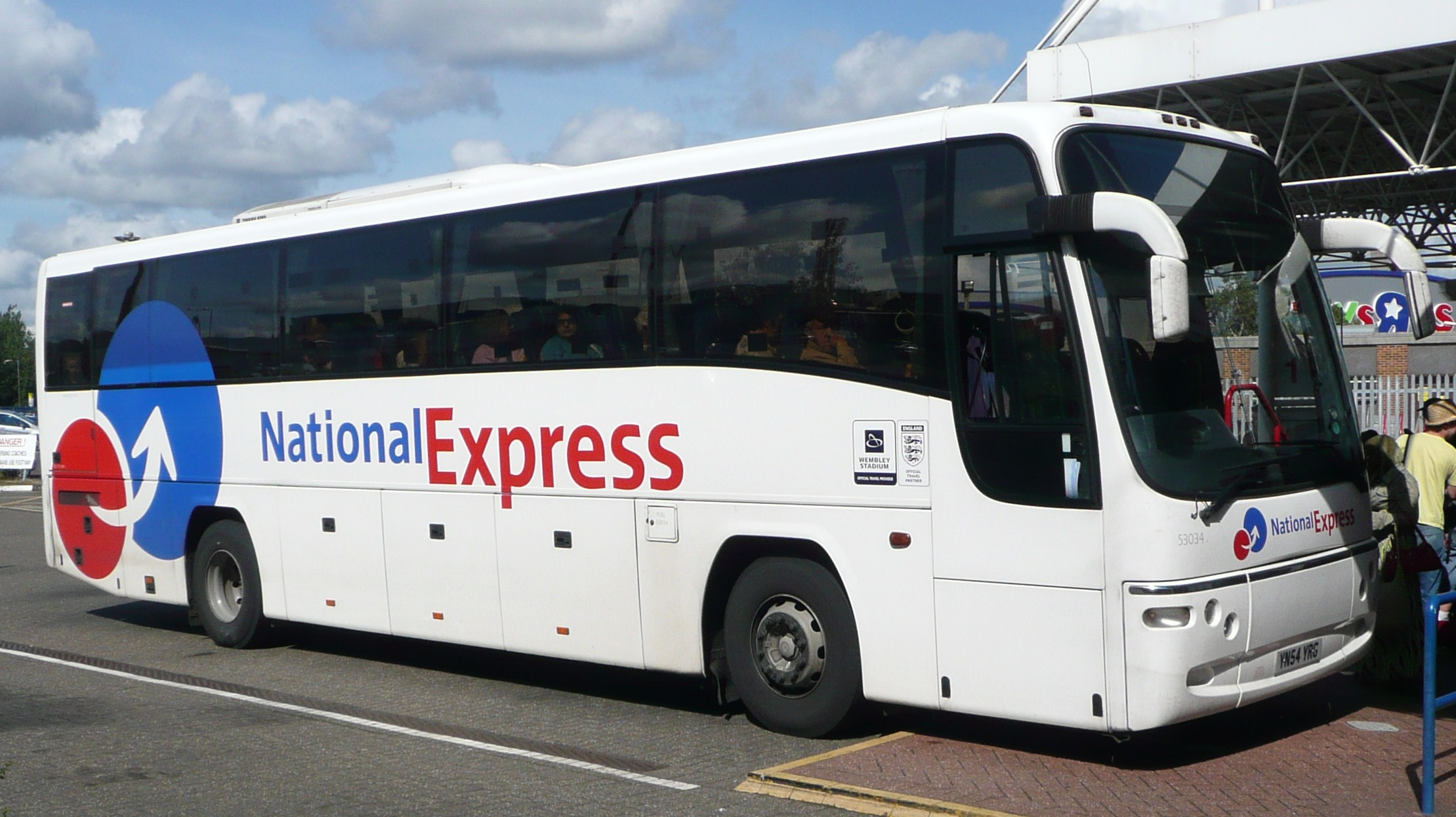
Stagecoach Yorkshire Plaxton Panther bodied Volvo B12B in the 2003 livery at Southampton in 2008

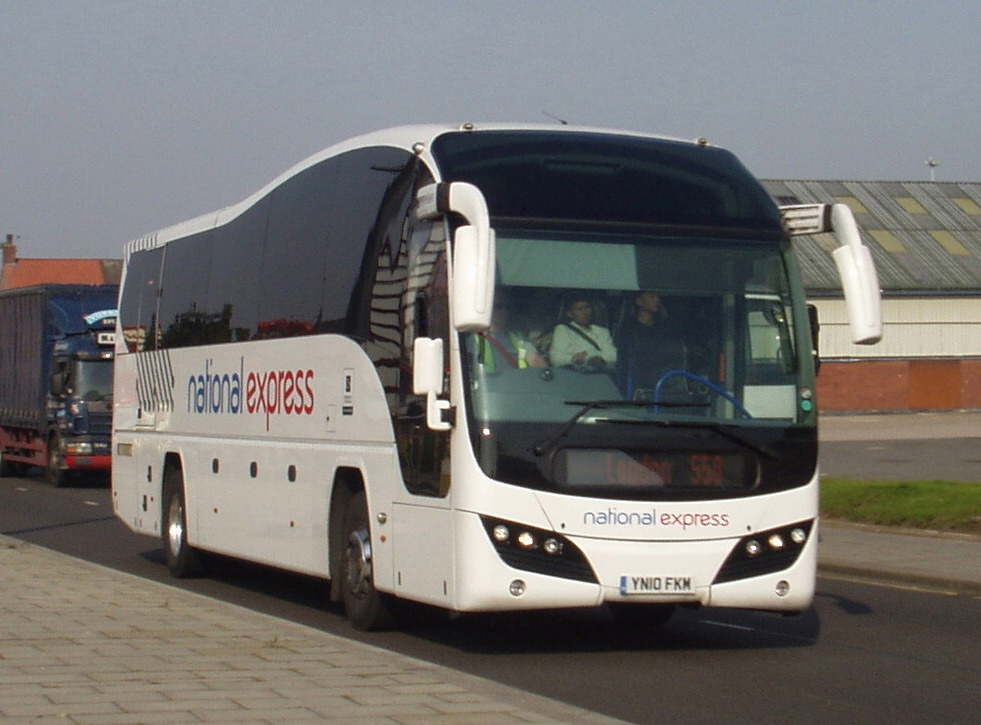
Selwyns Travel's Plaxton Elite bodied Volvo B9R in Liverpool

The Airport brand was created in 2003 when the National Express image brand was updated, merging the former Airlink, Flightlink, Jetlink and Speedlink brands.

=== Effects of the COVID-19 pandemic ===
Following the introduction of guidance from the UK Government on avoiding non-essential travel, services were replaced from 24 March 2020 with a limited network of services for passengers with essential travel needs. However, due to declining passenger numbers as a result of the restrictions, all services were suspended from 6 April 2020. Services restarted nearly three months later on 1 July, on about a quarter of route mileage and with reduced frequencies.

As a result of the discovery of a new, more transmissible variant and the implementation of tighter restrictions prohibiting travel in many areas of the country, services were significantly reduced by the end of December 2020. On the implementation of a third national lockdown in January 2021, services were again suspended from 11 January. Eleven weeks later, limited services again resumed on 29 March.

== Fares ==
National Express tickets are available through a variety of sources. Most tickets are booked on-line through both the company's own website and many third party sites. Telephone bookings are also available as are tickets through the traditional channels tickets of National Express ticket offices at coach stations, third-party agents at bus stations and travel agents. From 2013 to 2023, tickets were available for purchase from the Post Office.

=== Coachcards ===
National Express offers several discounts to customers.

- Young Persons Coachcard – Available to people aged 16–26. This card gives a third off standard and fully flexible fares.
- Senior Coachcard – Following the Government's scrapping of the concessionary half-price fares for the over-60s in October 2011, National Express introduced a Senior Coachcard. Available to over-60s, this gives a third off standard and fully flexible fares.
- Disabled Coachcard – Following the government's scrapping of the concessionary half-price fares for disabled people in October 2011, National Express introduced a Disabled Coachcard. Available to adults registered as disabled, this gives a third off standard and fully flexible fares.

== Fleet ==
National Express and its franchisees operate a limited number of coach types, primarily standardising on the Caetano Levante body on Mercedes-Benz, Scania and Volvo chassis. The Levante was designed between 2003 and 2005 by Portuguese coachbuilder Salvador Caetano and National Express exclusively for use on the network, equipped with a wheelchair lift at the front entrance door, and could be built on either two or three axles depending on chassis configuration. The most recent tri-axle Levante III was introduced onto the network in July 2018, with an updated version named the Levante IIIA introduced from late 2022.

After having initially trialled a Yutong TCe12 on airport service A9 during 2020, National Express is to introduce a Yutong GTe14 tri-axle battery electric coach on a four-week trial operating Stansted Airport services from March 2024. The company also purchased 25 Van Hool Altano TDX21 coaches for services 040 between London and Bristol, and the 540 between London and Manchester via Milton Keynes. These were introduced for Aberdeen services in October 2024.

National Express also runs ten Caetano Boa Vista bodied Scania K410 double decker coaches on its network, all of which are operated by Edwards Coaches. The first six entered service with National Express mainly for use between London Victoria and Luton Airport in October 2016, with the additional four later purchased by Edwards Coaches during 2018.

National Express had previously standardised on the double-deck variant of the MCW Metroliner for 'Rapide' coach services in 1980s, however by January 2007, the double-decker coach fleet had been reduced to 12 Neoplan Skyliners, all of which were later withdrawn from National Express service following a speeding driver overturning a Skyliner on an M25 motorway sliproad, causing the deaths of three passengers.

== On-board services ==
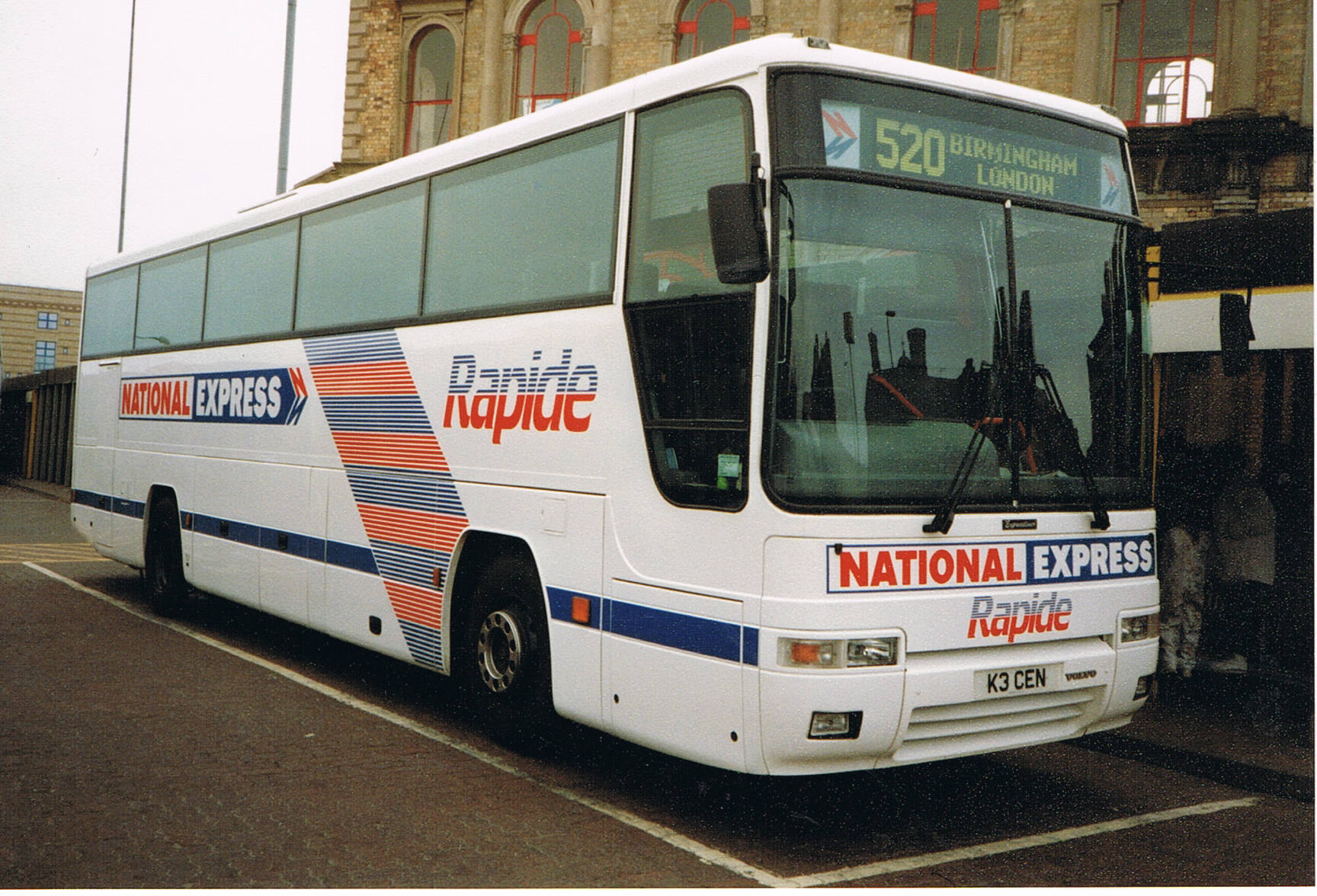
A National Express Plaxton Premiere bodied Volvo B10M Rapide coach

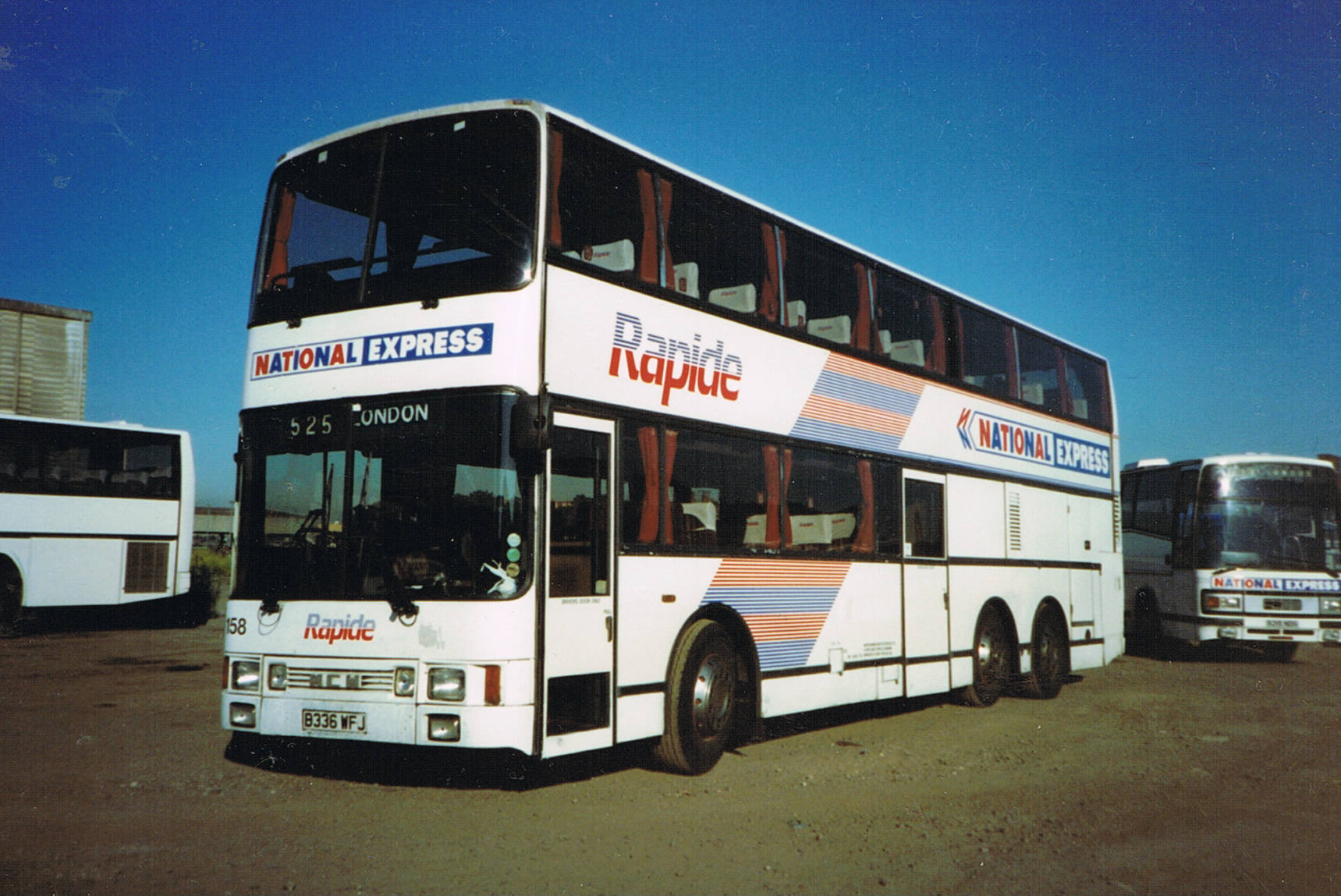
A National Express MCW Metroliner Rapide double-decker bus

In April 2001 National Express phased out its on-board catering service, having already phased out its on-board television service in the 1990s. However, in late 2004 National Express launched NXTV or National Xpress Television. Rather than showing a whole film as on an aircraft, NXTV would instead show various episodes of British television series such as A Touch of Frost, My Family and Top Gear, all of which were commissioned by ITV and the BBC. The service was displayed on small monitors situated above the overhead luggage compartments, powered by a motor to move downwards and upwards while the programming would be played from a DVD drive at the driver's dashboard.

The service was phased out in the summer of 2006, due to a lack of interest in purchasing headphones, available at vending machines in the major stations and also via on-board vendors before a journey. The headphone jack was compatible with any headphone, removing any reason to buy those offered. Also, by the time NXTV was launched, the Apple iPod was already at its height of popularity, diverting interest away from it. Programming was also very limited, with many of the episodes being frequent repeats from terrestrial television. The headphones were later given away for free when the service was about to be ceased. The advertising slogan was "Television shows as you board the coach".

== See also ==
- List of bus operators of the United Kingdom
- Coach transport in the United Kingdom
- ALSA, another bus & coach subsidiary of National Express
- Royal Blue Coach Services, coach company from West country
- Southdown Motor Services; coach company from West Sussex
